= Wrestlers (Eakins) =

Painting by Thomas Eakins

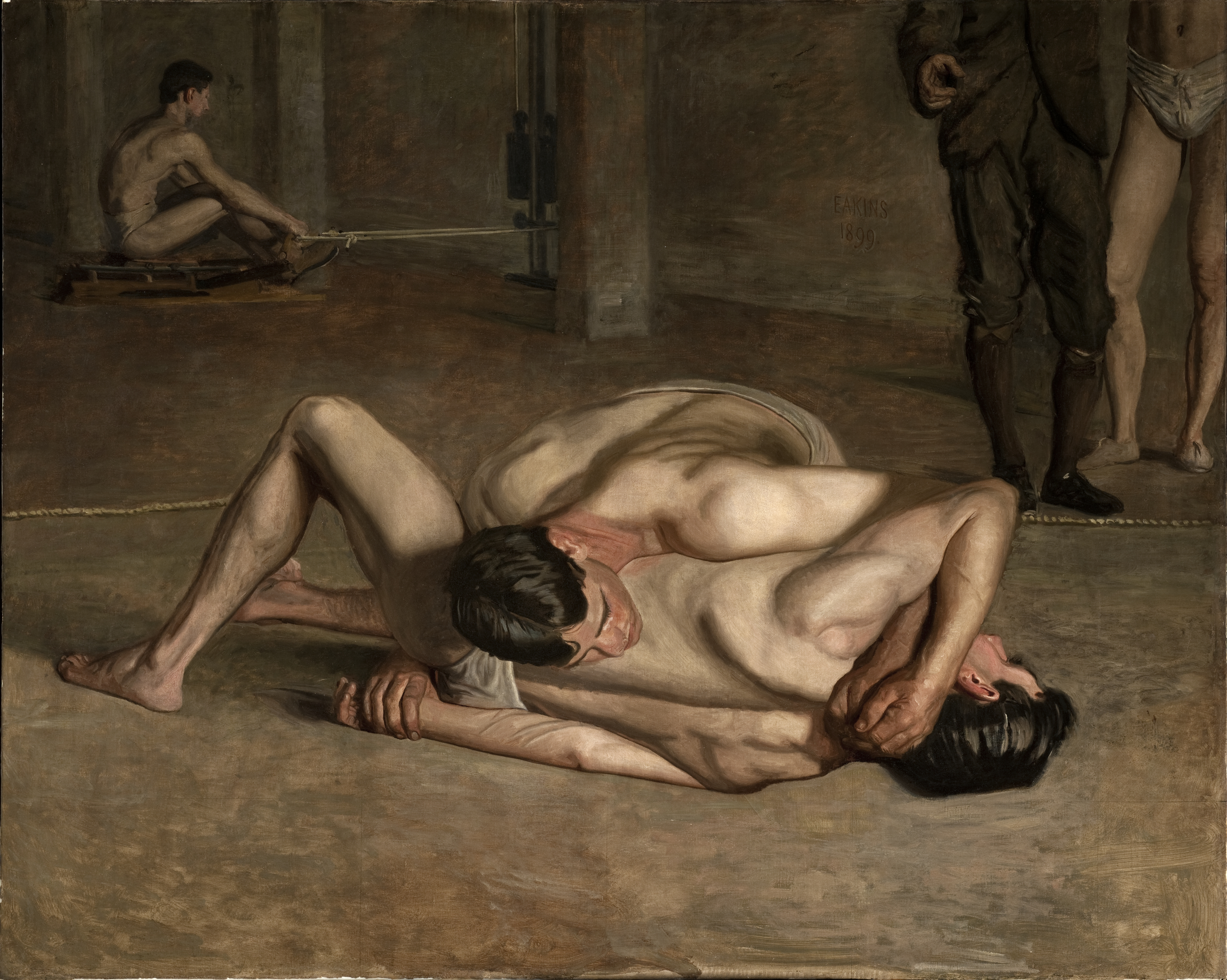
- G-317
- Year: 1899
- Medium: Oil on canvas
- Dimensions: 48 3/8 x 60 in (122.87 x 152.4 cm)
- Location: Los Angeles County Museum of Art; Los Angeles

Wrestlers is a name shared by three closely related 1899 paintings by American artist Thomas Eakins, (Goodrich catalog #317, #318, #319). The Los Angeles County Museum of Art (LACMA) owns the finished painting (G-317), and the oil sketch (G-318). The Philadelphia Museum of Art (PMA) owns a slightly smaller unfinished version (G-319). All three works depict a pair of nearly naked men engaged in a wrestling match. The setting for the finished painting is the Quaker City Barge Club (defunct), which once stood on Philadelphia's Boathouse Row.

== History ==
Eakins painted a series of works depicting scullers on the Schuylkill River in the 1870s. In the late 1890s, he painted three major works depicting boxers—Taking the Count (1898), Yale University Art Gallery; Salutat (1898), Addison Gallery of American Art; Between Rounds (1899), Philadelphia Museum of Art.

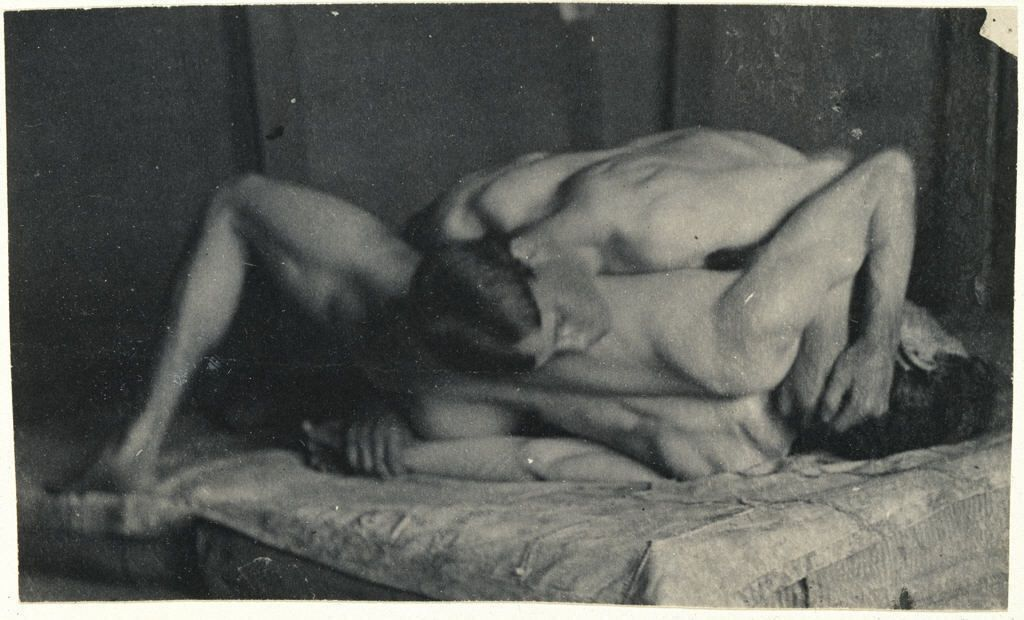
H-229. Photograph of wrestlers, attributed to Eakins (possibly May 22, 1899).

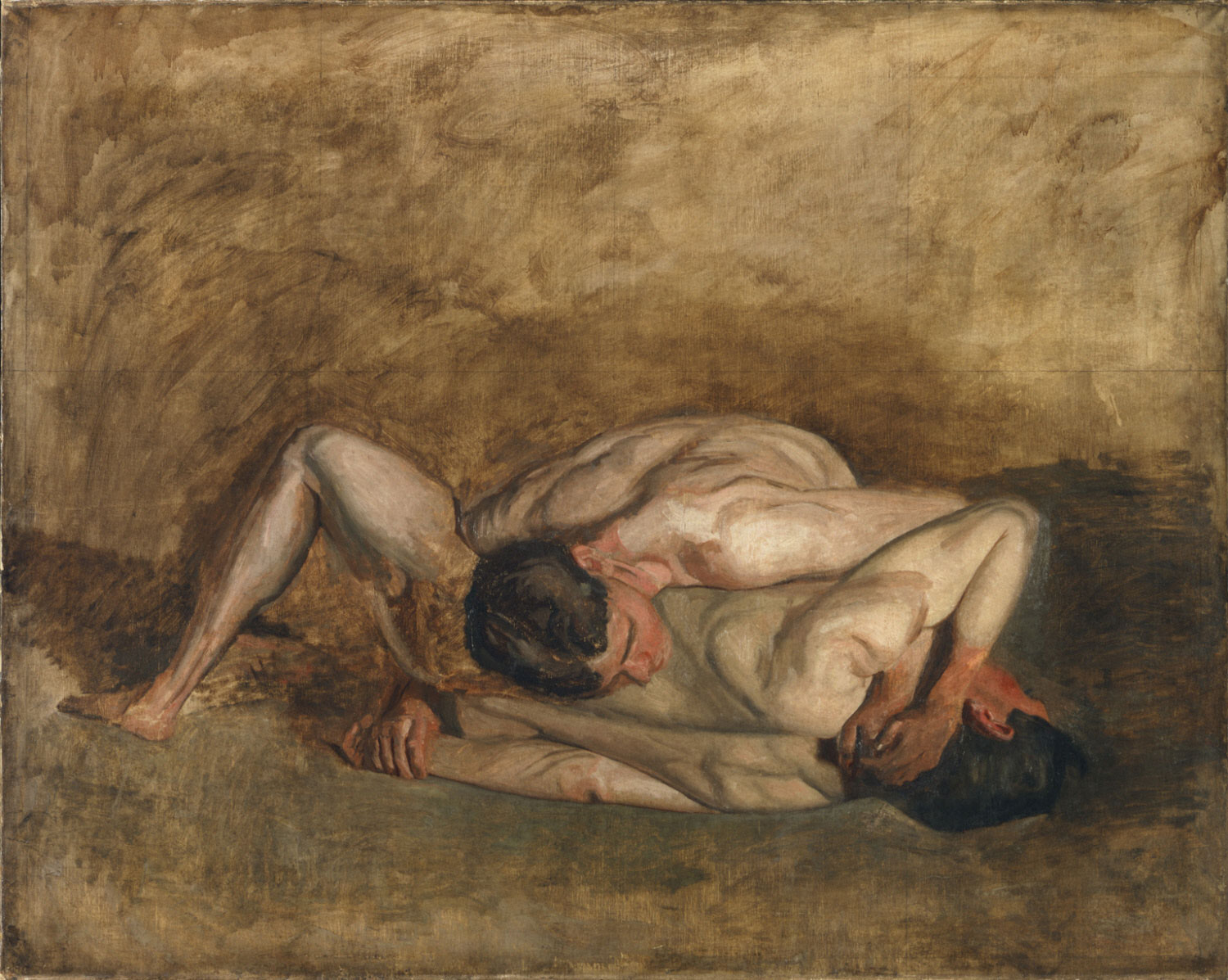
G-319. Unfinished version of Wrestlers (1899). 40 x 50 1/16 inches (101.6 x 127.2 cm). Philadelphia Museum of Art.

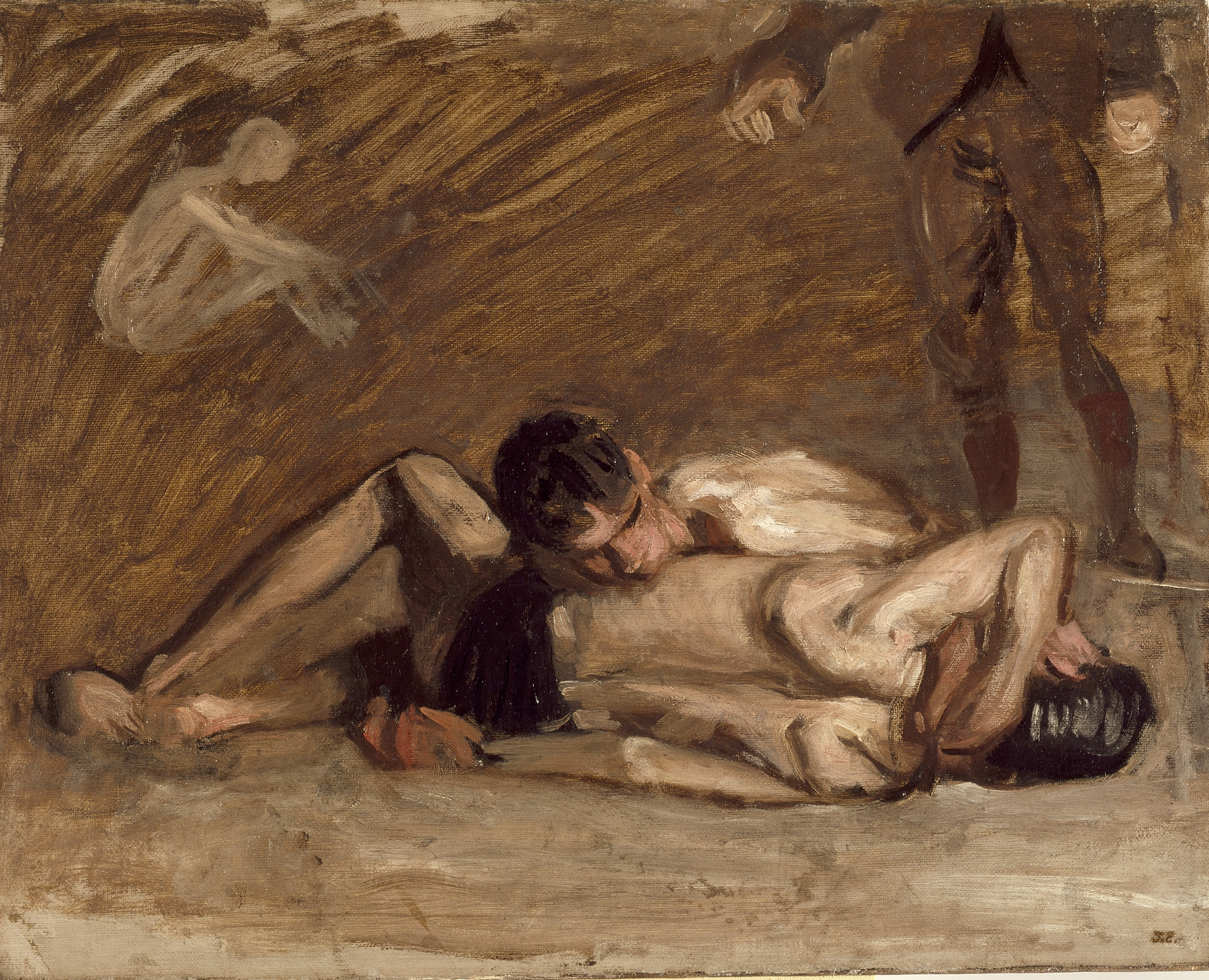
G-318. Oil sketch for Wrestlers (1899). 16 1/16 x 20 1/16 in. (40.8 x 50.96 cm). Los Angeles County Museum of Art.

On May 22, 1899, Eakins had two wrestlers pose in his 4th-floor studio at 1729 Mount Vernon Street, Philadelphia. Three days earlier, he had written to his friend, sportswriter Clarence Cranmer: "I am going to start the wrestling picture on Monday at half past two. I wish you could find it convenient to be at the studio and help us with advice as to positions and so forth." The artist's protégé Samuel Murray may have been present; he modeled a small sculpture of the wrestlers that is also dated 1899. Eakins painted the works from the live models and from a nearly identical photograph, that may have been taken that day. The photograph shows the wrestler on top holding the other in a half nelson and crotch hold.

PMA's unfinished version (G-319) was painted before the finished painting (G-317), and is thought to be an abandoned composition rather than a study. LACMA's finished painting (G-317) is larger, and features a well-defined setting with additional figures in the background. LACMA's oil sketch (G-318) varies from the other paintings in the position of the head and shoulders of the wrestler on top.

Author Allen Guttmann has compared Eakins' Wrestlers to George Luks' The Wrestlers (1905) and Max Slevogt's Wrestling School (1893), writing that all three paintings depict pairs of nude wrestling men lying on the ground in grappling holds.

=== Provenances ===
==== G-317 ====
Eakins painted the work for the National Academy Museum in New York in 1902 as his so-called diploma painting when he was inducted into membership. 70 years later, the academy sold it to the Columbus Museum of Art in Ohio. In 2005, Columbus sold it to Adelson Galleries in New York. In 2006 LACMA acquired it as the gift of Cecile C. Bartman, at one time a museum docent, and the Cecile and Fred Bartman Foundation.

==== G-319 ====
Eakins died in 1916, and a collection of his unsold paintings was exhibited at the 1926 Sesquicentennial Exposition in Philadelphia. PMA Director Fiske Kimball saw the abandoned version of Wrestlers at the world's fair, and inquired about buying it. According to Kimball, Cranmer (who was acting as the dealer for Eakins's widow) said the abandoned version had been valued low, and had not been included in the Eakins memorial exhibitions of a decade earlier. "He [Cranmer] said he would find out the price. It was $400. I bought it and by Christmas 1926 it was hanging in the library at Lemon Hill." Letters from Cranmer to Kimball in the PMA Archives identify the wrestler on top as Joseph McCann, but do not identify the man on the bottom. Kimball died in 1955, and made the abandoned version a bequest to his museum.

==== G-318 ====
William Preston Harrison bought the oil sketch for Wrestlers in 1927, from a touring exhibition of Eakins works. Harrison died in 1940, and made the early sketch a bequest to the Los Angeles County Museum of Art.

== See also ==
- List of works by Thomas Eakins
