= Thomas Eakins =

American artist (1844–1916)

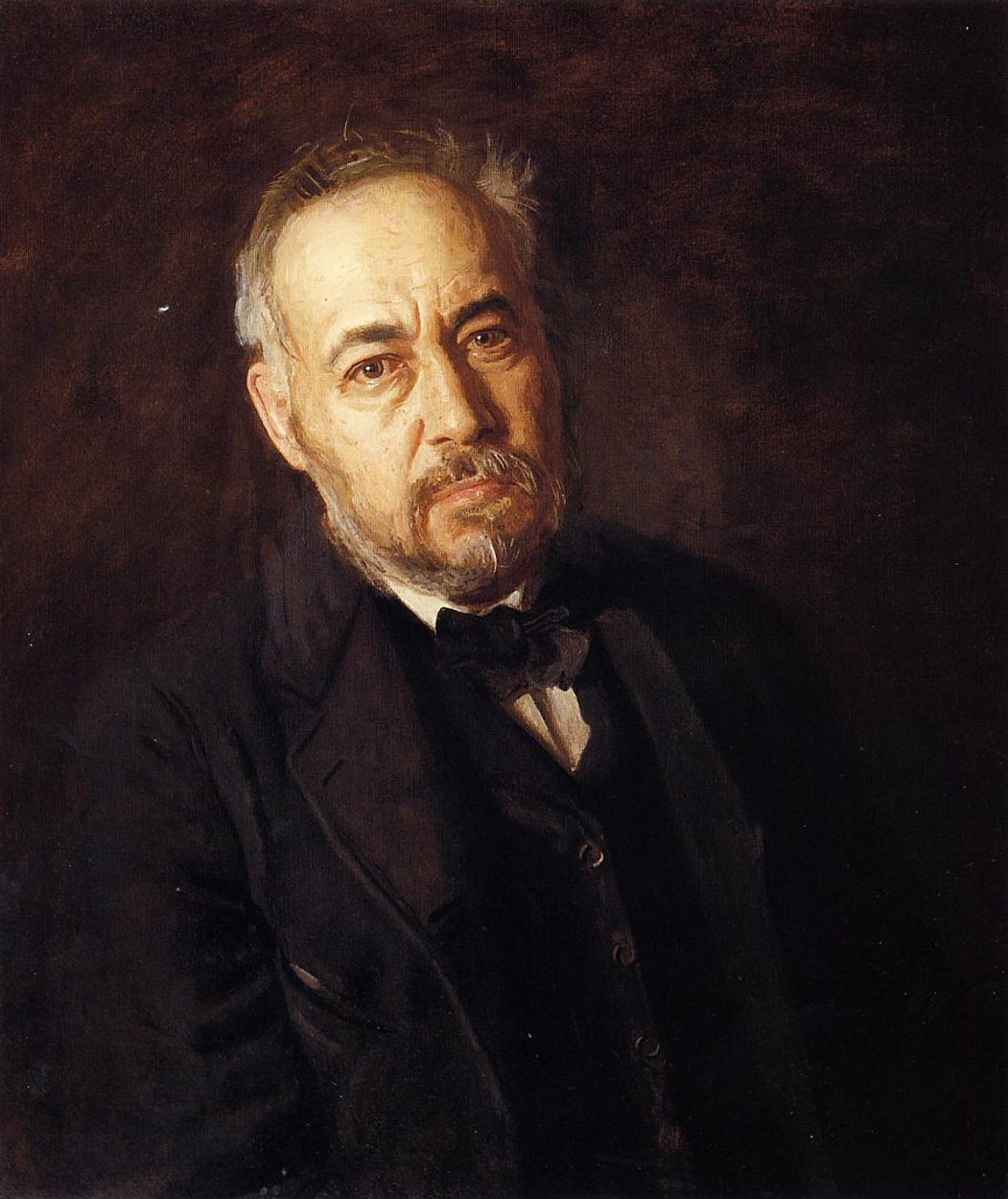
- Eakins' 1902 Self portrait, now housed at the National Academy of Design in New York City
- Born: Thomas Cowperthwait Eakins; July 25, 1844; Philadelphia, Pennsylvania, United States
- Died: June 25, 1916 (aged 71); Philadelphia, Pennsylvania, United States
- Education: Pennsylvania Academy of the Fine Arts, École des Beaux-Arts
- Known for: Painting, sculpture
- Notable work: Max Schmitt in a Single Scull, 1871; The Gross Clinic, 1875; The Swimming Hole, 1884–85; The Agnew Clinic, 1889; William Rush and His Model, 1908
- Movement: Realism
- Awards: National Academician

Thomas Cowperthwait Eakins (/ˈeɪkɪnz/; July 25, 1844 – June 25, 1916) was an American realist painter, photographer, sculptor, and fine arts educator. He is widely acknowledged to be one of the most important American artists.

For the length of his professional career, from the early 1870s until his health began to fail some 40 years later, Eakins worked exactingly from life, choosing as his subject the people of his hometown of Philadelphia. He painted several hundred portraits, usually of friends, family members, or prominent people in the arts, sciences, medicine, and clergy. Taken en masse, the portraits offer an overview of the intellectual life of contemporary Philadelphia of the late 19th and early 20th centuries.

In addition, Eakins produced a number of large paintings set in the offices, streets, parks, rivers, arenas, and surgical amphitheaters of his city. These active outdoor venues allowed him to paint the subject that most inspired him: the nude or lightly clad figure in motion. In the process, he could model the forms of the body in full sunlight, and create images of deep space utilizing his studies in perspective. Eakins took keen interest in new motion photography, a field in which he is now seen as an innovator.

Eakins was also an educator, and his instruction was a highly influential presence in American art. The difficulties he encountered as an artist were seeking to paint portraits and figures realistically as behavioral and sexual scandals truncated his success and challenged his reputation.

Eakins was a controversial figure whose work received little recognition during his lifetime. Since his death, he has been celebrated by American art historians as "the strongest, most profound realist in nineteenth- and early-twentieth-century American art".

== Early life and education ==
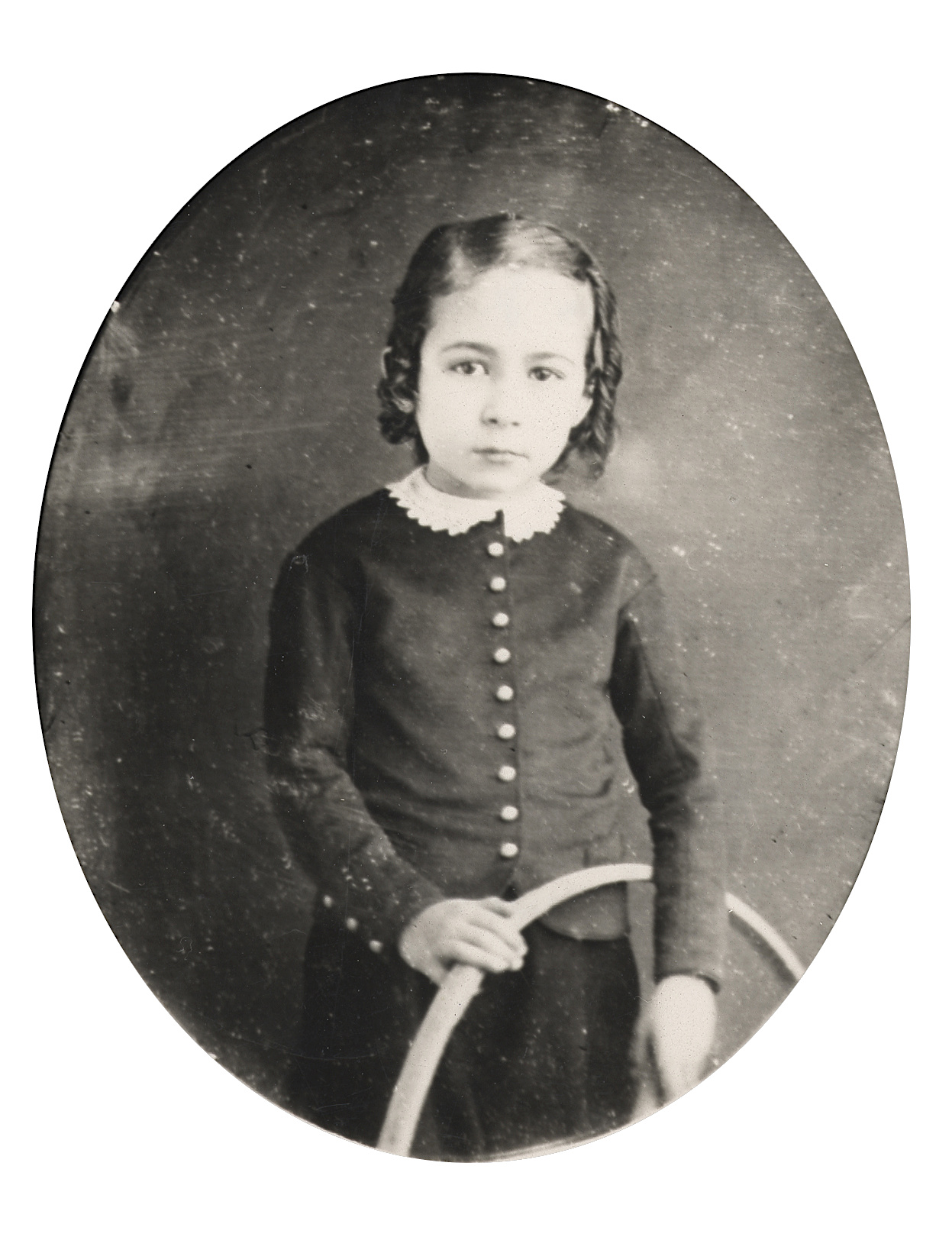
Eakins at age six

Eakins was born and lived most of his life in Philadelphia. He was the first child of Caroline Cowperthwait Eakins, a woman of English and Dutch descent, and Benjamin Eakins, a writing master and calligraphy teacher of Scottish and Irish ancestry. His father grew up on a farm in Valley Forge, Pennsylvania, the son of a weaver. He was successful in his chosen profession, and moved to Philadelphia in the early 1840s, to raise his family. Eakins observed his father at work and by twelve demonstrated skill in precise line drawing, perspective, and the use of a grid to lay out a careful design, all skills he later applied to his art.

Eakins was an athletic child who enjoyed rowing, ice skating, swimming, wrestling, sailing, and gymnastics; he later used these as subjects in his painting and encouraged them in his students. Eakins attended Central High School in Philadelphia, the premier public school for applied science and arts in the city, where he excelled in mechanical drawing. Eakins met fellow artist and lifelong friend Charles Lewis Fussell in high school, and they reunited at the Pennsylvania Academy of the Fine Arts in Philadelphia, where Eakins enrolled in 1861. At Pennsylvania Academy of the Fine Arts, Eakins enrolled in courses in anatomy and dissection at Jefferson Medical College from 1864 to 1865. For a while, he followed his father's profession and was listed in city directories as a writing teacher. His scientific interest in the human body led him to consider becoming a surgeon.

Eakins then studied art in Europe from 1866 to 1870, including with Jean-Léon Gérôme in Paris; he was only the second American pupil of the French realist painter, who was known as a master of Orientalism. Eakins also attended the atelier of Léon Bonnat, a realist painter who emphasized anatomical preciseness, a method adapted by Eakins. While studying at the École des Beaux-Arts, he seems to have taken scant interest in the new Impressionist movement, nor was he impressed by what he perceived as the classical pretensions of the French Academy. A letter home to his father in 1868 made his aesthetic clear:

She [the female nude] is the most beautiful thing there is in the world except a naked man, but I never yet saw a study of one exhibited... It would be a godsend to see a fine man model painted in the studio with the bare walls, alongside of the smiling smirking goddesses of waxy complexion amidst the delicious arsenic green trees and gentle wax flowers & purling streams running melodious up & down the hills especially up. I hate affectation.

Already at age 24, "nudity and verity were linked with an unusual closeness in his mind." Yet his desire for truthfulness was more expansive, and the letters home to Philadelphia reveal a passion for realism that included, but was not limited to, the study of the figure.

A trip to Spain for six months confirmed his admiration for the realism of artists such as Diego Velázquez and Jusepe de Ribera. In Seville in 1869, he painted Carmelita Requeña (image link), a portrait of a seven-year-old Romani dancer more freely and colorfully painted than his Paris studies. That same year he attempted his first large oil painting, A Street Scene in Seville (image link), wherein he first dealt with the complications of a scene observed outside the studio. Although he failed to matriculate in a formal degree program and had shown no works in the European salons, Eakins succeeded in absorbing the techniques and methods of French and Spanish masters, and he began to formulate his artistic vision which he demonstrated in his first major painting upon his return to America. "I shall seek to achieve my broad effect from the very beginning", he declared.

== Career ==
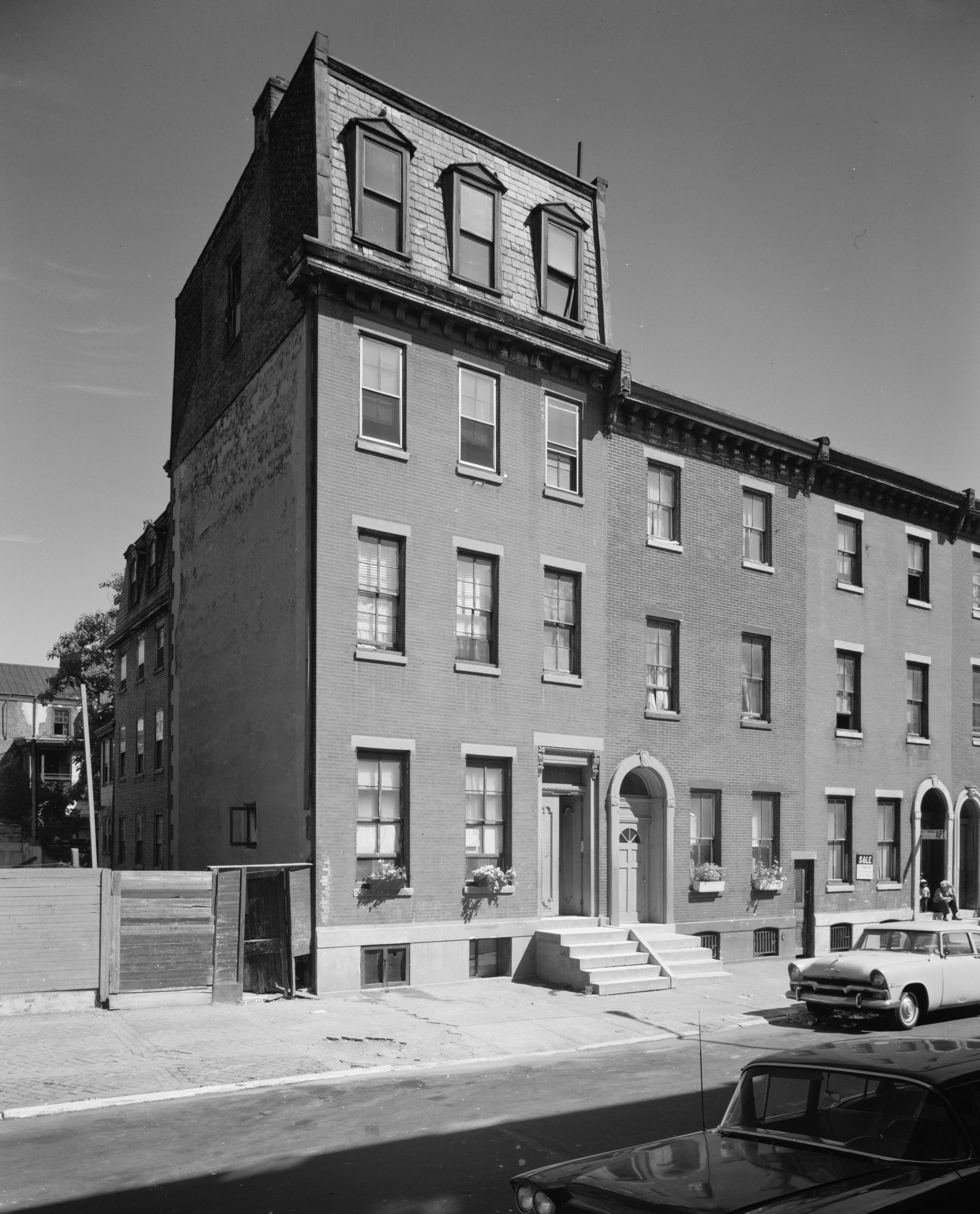
Thomas Eakins House at 1729 Mount Vernon Street, Philadelphia, in 1967. Benjamin Eakins, his father, added the 4th floor in 1874 as a studio for his son.

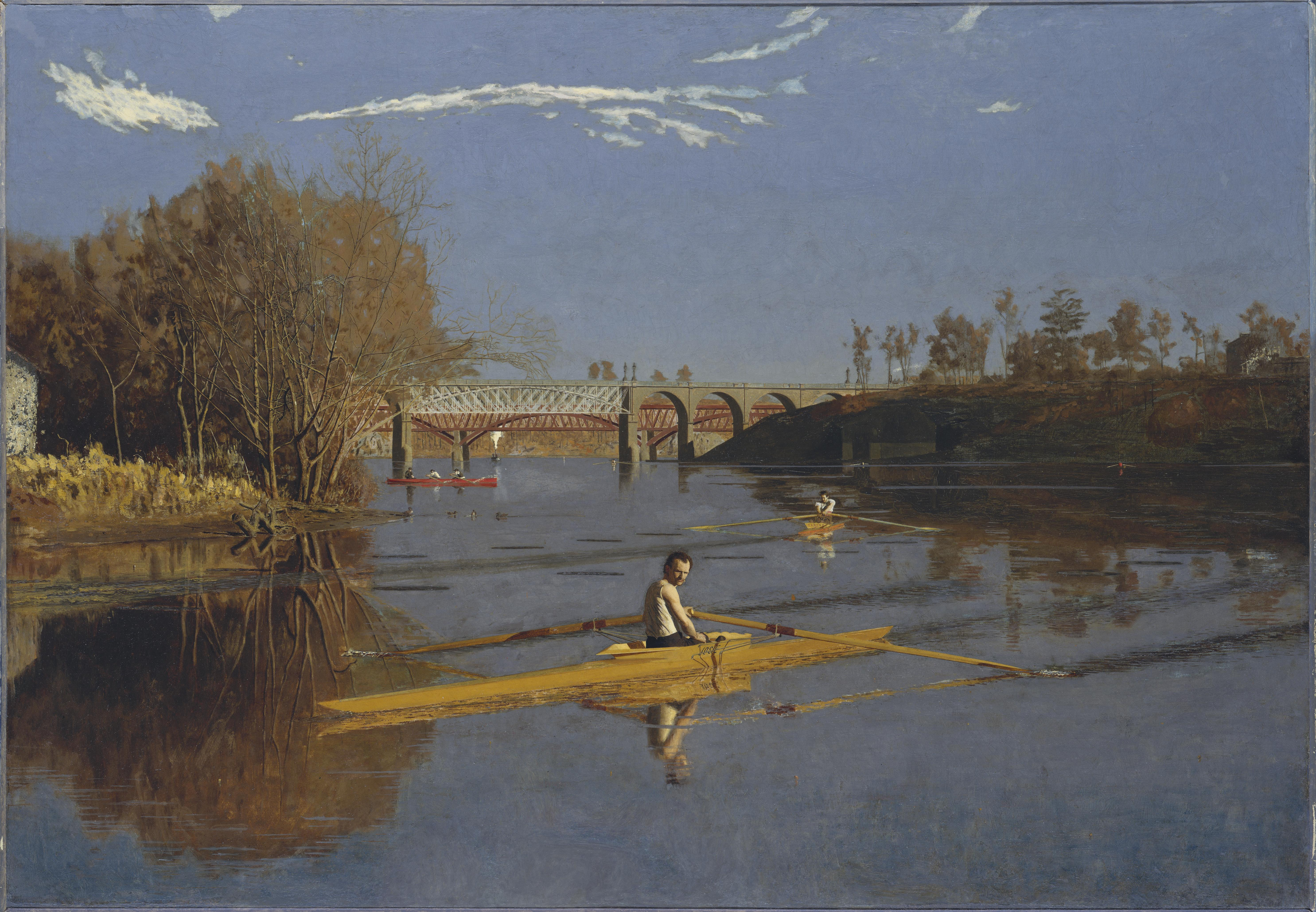
Max Schmitt in a Single Scull (1871), now housed in the Metropolitan Museum of Art in New York City

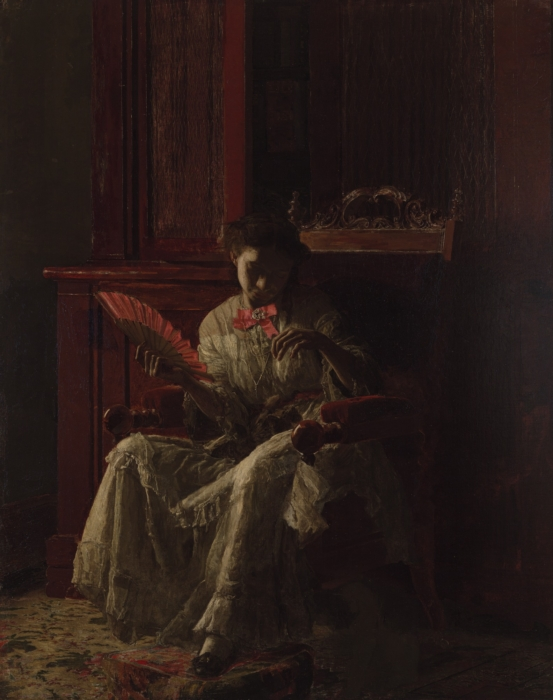
Kathrin Crowell with Kitten (1872)

Eakins' first works upon his return from Europe included a large group of rowing scenes, eleven oils and watercolors in all, of which the first and most famous is Max Schmitt in a Single Scull (1871; also known as The Champion Single Sculling). Both his subject and his technique drew attention. His selection of a contemporary sport was "a shock to the artistic conventionalities of the city". Eakins placed himself in the painting, in a scull behind Schmitt, his name inscribed on the boat.

Typically, the work entailed critical observation of the painting's subject, and preparatory drawings of the figure and perspective plans of the scull in the water. Its preparation and composition indicates the importance of Eakins' academic training in Paris. It was a completely original conception, true to Eakins' firsthand experience, and an almost startlingly successful image for the artist, who had struggled with his first outdoor composition less than a year before. His first known sale was the watercolor The Sculler (1874). Most critics judged the rowing pictures successful and auspicious, but after the initial flourish, Eakins never revisited the subject of rowing and went on to other sports themes.

At the same time that he made these initial ventures into outdoor themes, Eakins produced a series of domestic Victorian interiors, often with his father, his sisters or friends as the subjects. Home Scene (1871; image link), Elizabeth at the Piano (1875; image link), The Chess Players (1876), and Elizabeth Crowell and her Dog (1874; image link), each dark in tonality, focus on the unsentimental characterization of individuals adopting natural attitudes in their homes.

It was in this vein that in 1872 he painted his first large scale portrait, Kathrin (image link), in which the subject, Kathrin Crowell, is seen in dim light, playing with a kitten. In 1874, Eakins and Crowell became engaged; they were still engaged five years later, when Crowell died of meningitis in 1879.

=== Teaching and forced resignation ===
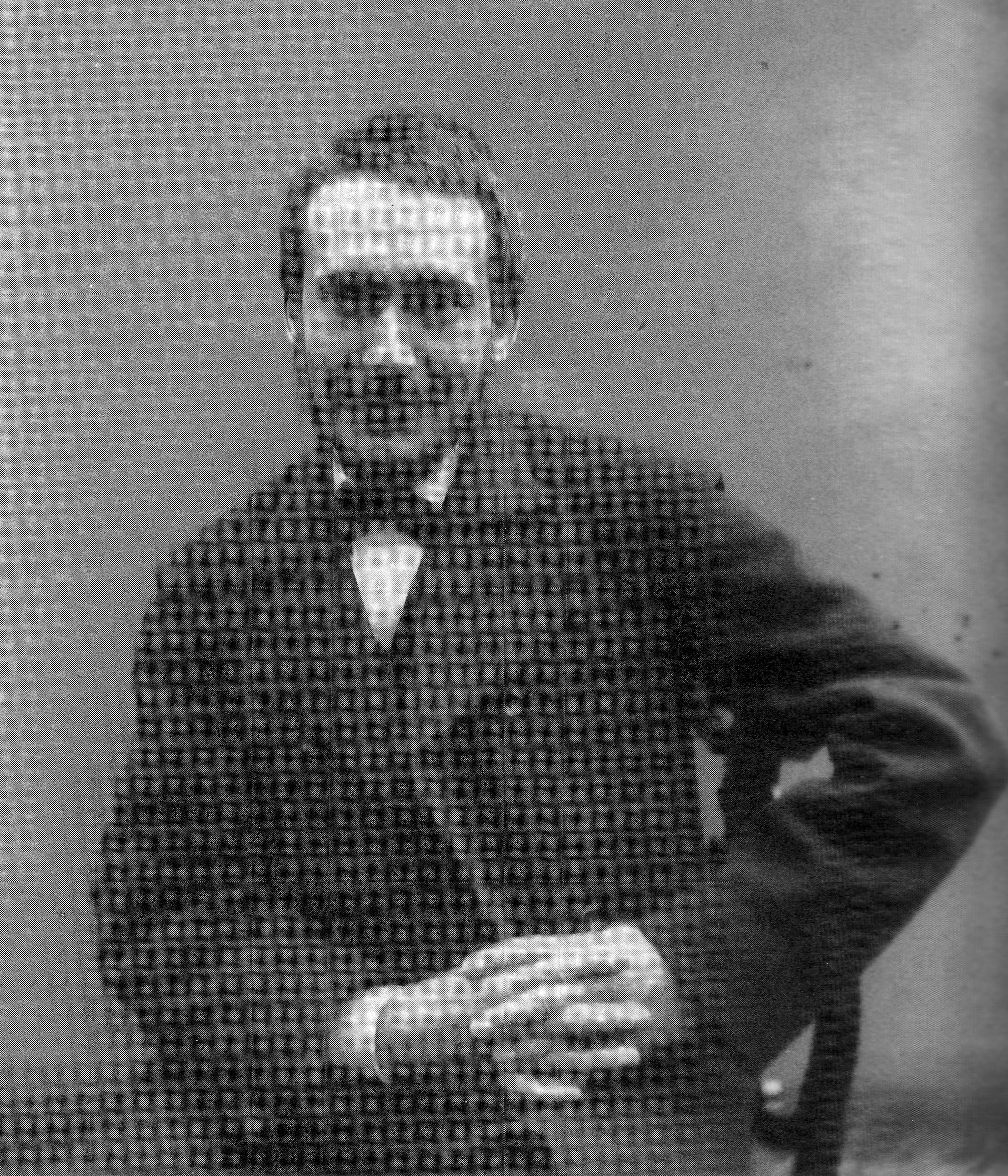
Eakins, c. 1882

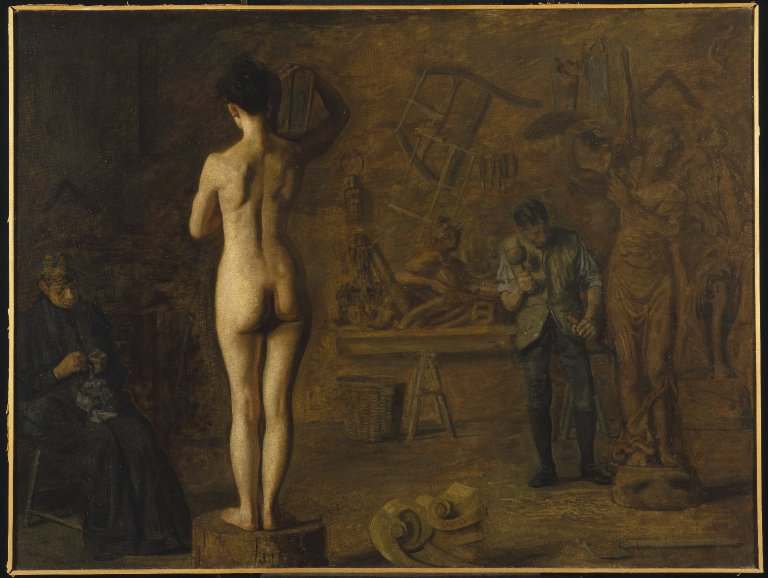
William Rush Carving His Allegorical Figure of the Schuylkill River, a 1908 Eakins painting now housed in the Brooklyn Museum

Eakins returned to the Pennsylvania Academy to teach in 1876 as a volunteer after the opening of the school's new Frank Furness designed building. He became a salaried professor in 1878, and rose to director in 1882. His teaching methods were controversial: there was no drawing from antique casts, and students received only a short study in charcoal, followed quickly by their introduction to painting, in order to grasp subjects in true color as soon as practical. He encouraged students to use photography as an aid to understanding anatomy and the study of motion, and disallowed prize competitions. Although there was no specialized vocational instruction, students with aspirations for using their school training for applied arts, such as illustration, lithography, and decoration, were as welcome as students interested in becoming portrait artists.

Most notable was his interest in the instruction of all aspects of the human figure, including anatomical study of the human and animal body, and surgical dissection; there were also rigorous courses in the fundamentals of form, and studies in perspective which involved mathematics. As an aid to the study of anatomy, plaster casts were made from dissections, duplicates of which were furnished to students. A similar study was made of the anatomy of horses; acknowledging Eakins' expertise, in 1891 his friend, the sculptor William Rudolf O'Donovan, asked him to collaborate on the commission to create bronze equestrian reliefs of Abraham Lincoln and Ulysses S. Grant, for the Soldiers' and Sailors' Arch in Grand Army Plaza in Brooklyn.

Owing to Eakins' devotion to working from life, the academy's course of study was by the early 1880s the most "liberal and advanced in the world". Eakins believed in teaching by example and letting the students find their own way with only terse guidance. His students included painters, cartoonists, and illustrators such as Henry Ossawa Tanner, Thomas Pollock Anshutz, Edward Willis Redfield, Colin Campbell Cooper, Alice Barber Stephens, Frederick Judd Waugh, T. S. Sullivant, A. B. Frost,, and Canadian painter George Agnew Reid.

He stated his teaching philosophy bluntly, "A teacher can do very little for a pupil & should only be thankful if he don't hinder him ... and the greater the master, mostly the less he can say." He believed that women should "assume professional privileges" as would men. Life classes and dissection were segregated but women had access to male models (who were nude but wore loincloths).

The line between impartiality and questionable behavior was a fine one. When a female student, Amelia Van Buren, asked about the movement of the pelvis, Eakins invited her to his studio, where he undressed and "gave her the explanation as I could not have done by words only". Such incidents, coupled with the ambitions of his younger associates to oust him and take over the school themselves, created tensions between him and the academy's board of directors. He was ultimately forced to resign in 1886, for removing the loincloth of a male model in a class where female students were present.

The forced resignation was a major setback for Eakins. His family was split, with his in-laws siding against him in public dispute. He struggled to protect his name against rumors and false charges, had bouts of ill health, and suffered a humiliation which he felt for the rest of his life. A drawing manual he had written and prepared illustrations for remained unfinished and unpublished during his lifetime. Eakins' popularity among the students was such that a number of them broke with the academy and formed the Art Students' League of Philadelphia (1886–1893), where Eakins subsequently instructed. It was there that he met the student Samuel Murray, who would become his protege and lifelong friend. He also lectured and taught at a number of other schools, including the Art Students League of New York, the National Academy of Design, Cooper Union, and the Art Students' Guild in Washington, DC. Dismissed in March 1895 by the Drexel Institute in Philadelphia for again using a fully nude male model, he gradually withdrew from teaching by 1898.

=== Photography ===
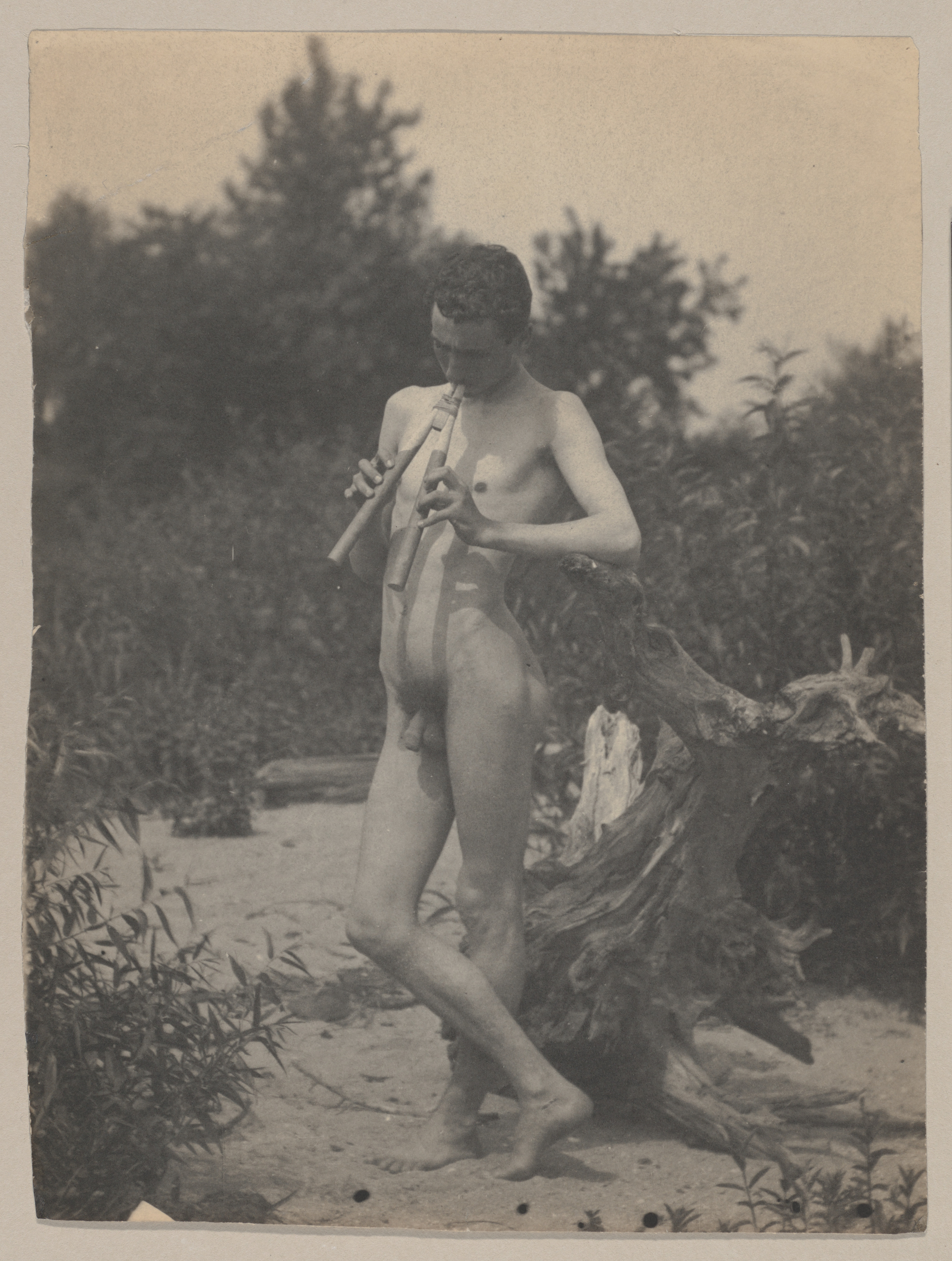
Standing Male Nude with Pipes by Eakins (1880s), now housed at the Metropolitan Museum of Art

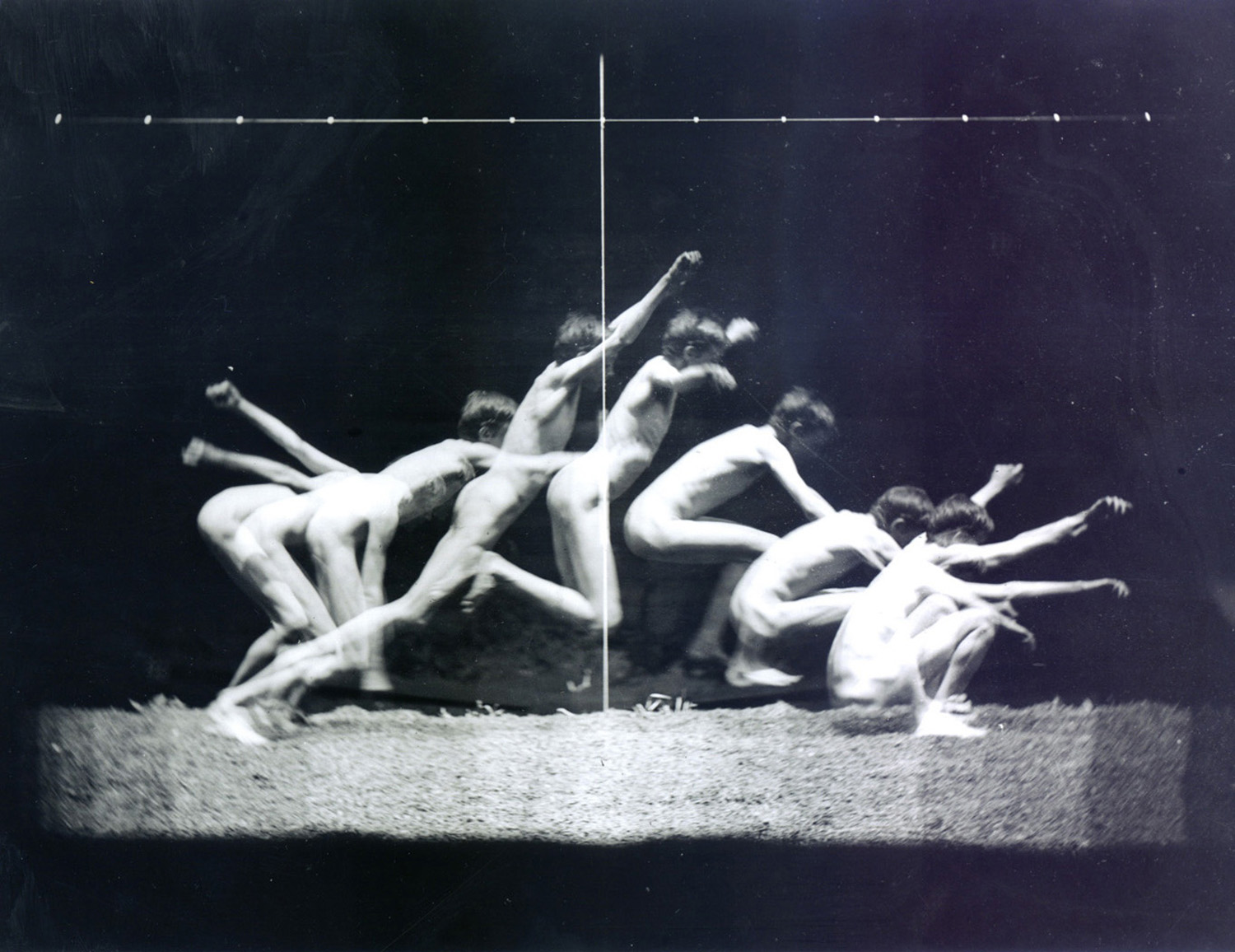
Study in Human Motion an Eakins photograph

Eakins has been credited with having "introduced the camera to the American art studio". During his study abroad, he was exposed to the use of photography by the French realists, though the use of photography was still frowned upon as a shortcut by traditionalists.

In the late 1870s, Eakins was introduced to the photographic motion studies of Eadweard Muybridge, particularly the equine studies, and became interested in using the camera to study sequential movement. In 1883, Muybridge gave a lecture at the academy, arranged by Eakins and University of Pennsylvania (Penn) trustee Fairman Rogers. A group of Philadelphians, including Penn Provost William Pepper and the publisher J. B. Lippincott recruited Muybridge to work at Penn under their sponsorship. In 1884, Eakins worked briefly alongside Muybridge in the latter's photographic studio at the northeast corner of 36th and Pine streets in Philadelphia.

Eakins soon performed his own independent motion studies, also usually involving the nude figure, and even developed his own technique for capturing movement on film. Whereas Muybridge's system relied on a series of cameras triggered to produce a sequence of individual photographs, Eakins preferred to use a single camera to produce a series of exposures superimposed on one negative. Eakins was more interested in precision measurements on a single image to aid in translating a motion into a painting, while Muybridge preferred separate images that could also be displayed by his primitive movie projector.

After Eakins obtained a camera in 1880, several paintings, such as Mending the Net (1881; image link) and Arcadia (1883; image link), are known to have been derived at least in part from his photographs. Some figures appear to be detailed transcriptions and tracings from the photographs by some device like a magic lantern, which Eakins then took pains to cover up with oil paint. Eakins' methods appear to be meticulously applied, and rather than shortcuts, were likely used in a quest for accuracy and realism.

An excellent example of Eakins' use of this new technology is his painting A May Morning in the Park, which relied heavily on photographic motion studies to depict the true gait of the four horses pulling the coach of patron Rogers. But in typical fashion, Eakins also employed wax figures and oil sketches to get the final effect he desired.

The so-called "Naked Series", which began in 1883, were nude photos of students and professional models which were taken to show real human anatomy from several specific angles, and were often hung and displayed for study at the school. Later, less regimented poses were taken indoors and out, of men, women, and children, including his wife. The most provocative, and the only ones combining males and females, were nude photos of Eakins and a female model (see below). Although witnesses and chaperones were usually on site, and the poses were mostly traditional in nature, the sheer quantity of the photos and Eakins' overt display of them may have undermined his standing at the academy. In all, about eight hundred photographs are now attributed to Eakins and his circle, most of which are figure studies, both clothed and nude, and portraits. No other American artist of his time matched Eakins' interest in photography, nor produced a comparable body of photographic works.

Eakins used photography for his own private ends as well. Aside from nude men, and women, he also photographed nude children. While the photographs of the nude adults are more artistically composed, the younger children and infants are posed less formally. These photographs, that are "charged with sexual overtones", as Susan Danly and Cheryl Leibold write, are of unidentified children. In the catalog of Eakins' collection at the Pennsylvania Academy of the Fine Arts, photograph number 308 is of an African American child reclining on a couch and posed as Venus. Both Saidiya Hartman and Fred Moten write, respectively, about the photograph, and the child that it arrests.

=== Portraits ===
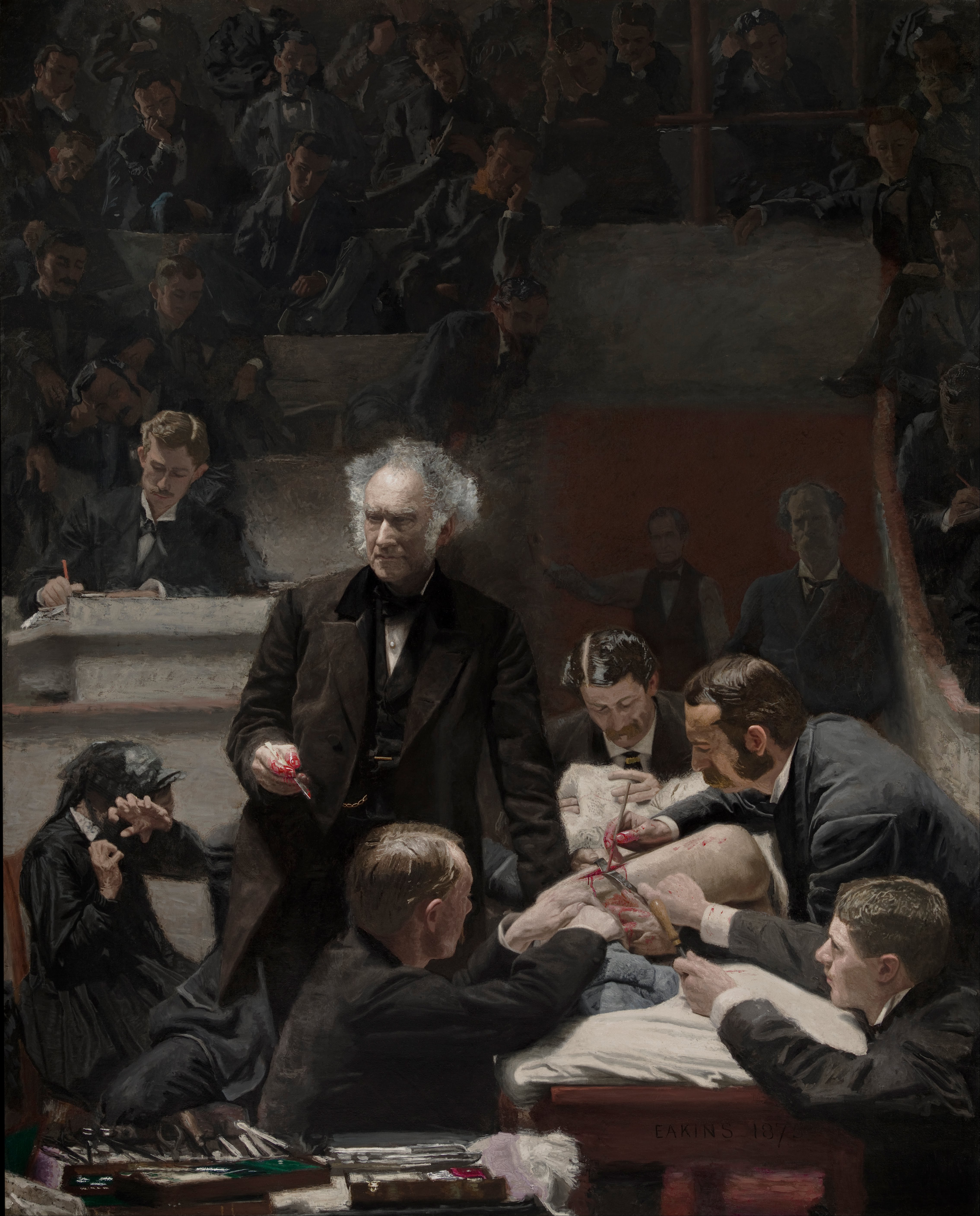
The Gross Clinic (1875), now housed in the Philadelphia Museum of Art and Pennsylvania Academy of the Fine Arts

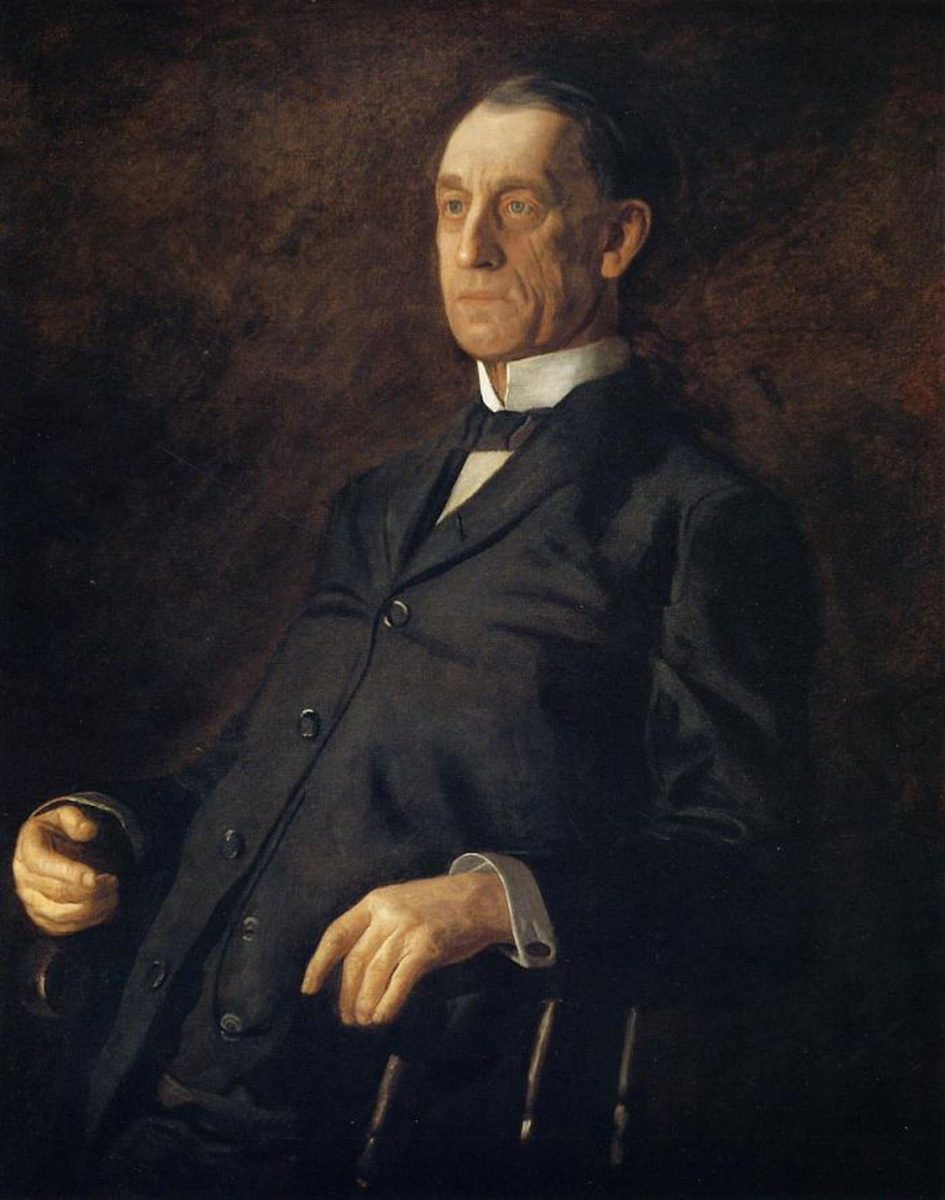
Portrait of Ashbury W. Lee, a 1905 oil canvas, now housed at Reynolda House

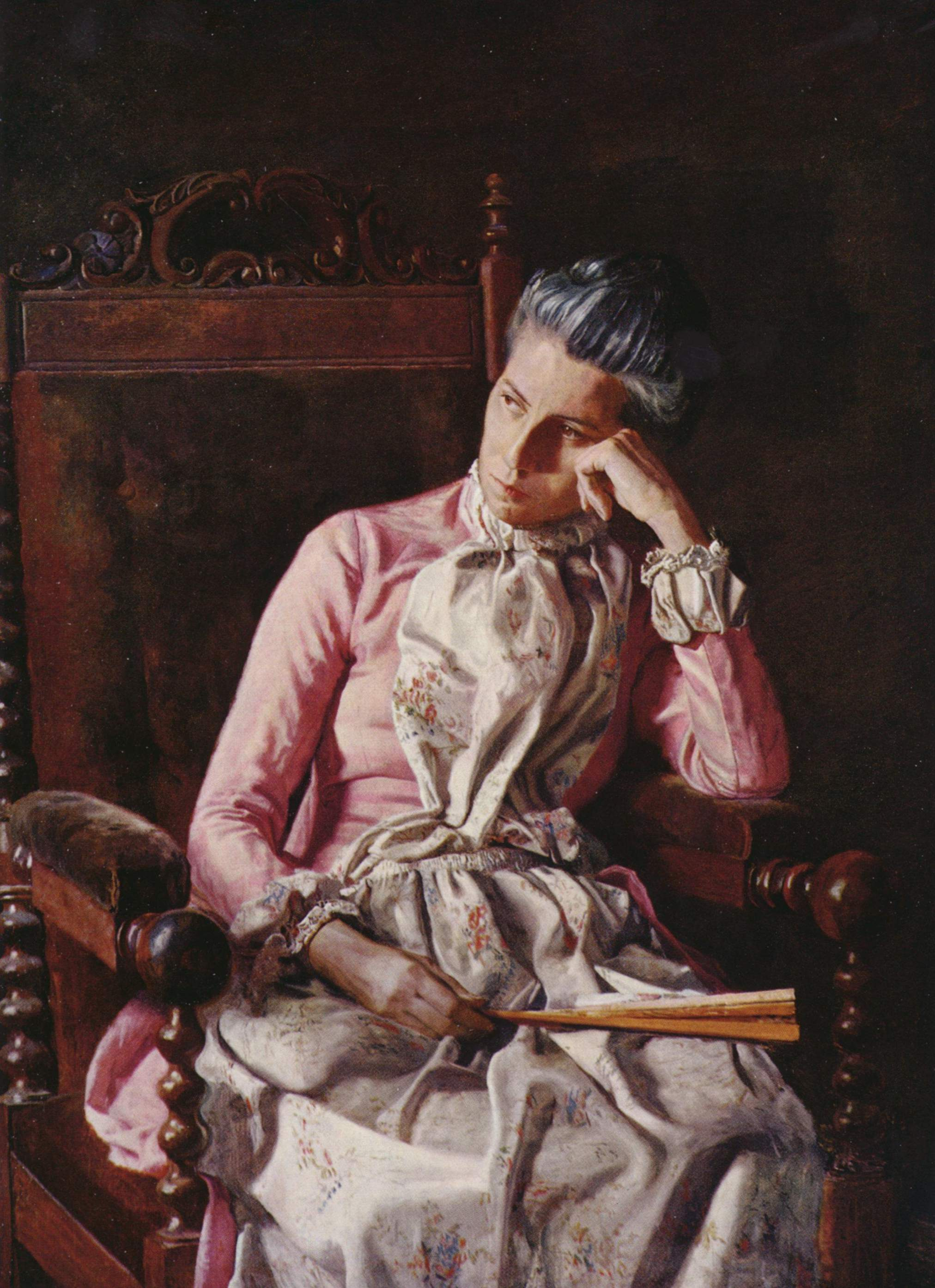
Miss Amelia Van Buren (c. 1891), now housed at The Phillips Collection in Washington, DC

According to one reviewer in 1876: "This portrait of Dr. Gross is a great work—we know of nothing greater that has ever been executed in America".

I will never have to give up painting, for even now I could paint heads good enough to make a living anywhere in America.

For Eakins, portraiture held little interest as a means of fashionable idealization or even simple verisimilitude. Instead, it provided the opportunity to reveal the character of an individual through the modeling of solid anatomical form. This meant that, notwithstanding his youthful optimism, Eakins would never be a commercially successful portrait painter, as few paid commissions came his way. But his total output of some two hundred and fifty portraits is characterized by "an uncompromising search for the unique human being".

Often this search for individuality required that the subject be painted in his own daily working environment. Eakins' Portrait of Professor Benjamin H. Rand (1874) was a prelude to what many consider his most important work.

Stunningly illuminated, Dr. Gross is the embodiment of heroic rationalism, a symbol of American intellectual achievement.

— William Innes Homer, Thomas Eakins: His Life and Art

In The Gross Clinic (1875), a renowned Philadelphia surgeon, Dr. Samuel D. Gross, is seen presiding over an operation to remove part of a diseased bone from a patient's thigh. Gross lectures in an amphitheater crowded with students at Jefferson Medical College. Eakins spent nearly a year on the painting, again choosing a novel subject, the discipline of modern surgery, in which Philadelphia was in the forefront. He initiated the project and may have had the goal of a grand work befitting a showing at the Centennial Exposition of 1876. Though rejected for the Art Gallery, the painting was shown on the centennial grounds at an exhibit of a U.S. Army Post Hospital. In sharp contrast, another Eakins submission, The Chess Players, was accepted by the committee and was much admired at the Centennial Exhibition, and critically praised.

At 96 by 78 inches (240 × 200 cm), The Gross Clinic is one of the artist's largest works, and considered by some to be his greatest. Eakins' high expectations at the start of the project were recorded in a letter, "What elates me more is that I have just got a new picture blocked in and it is very far better than anything I have ever done. As I spoil things less and less in finishing I have the greatest hopes of this one" But if Eakins hoped to impress his home town with the picture, he was to be disappointed; public reaction to the painting of a realistic surgical incision and the resultant blood was ambivalent at best, and it was finally purchased by the college for the unimpressive sum of $200. Eakins borrowed it for subsequent exhibitions, where it drew strong reactions, such as that of the New York Daily Tribune, which both acknowledged and damned its powerful image, "but the more one praises it, the more one must condemn its admission to a gallery where men and women of weak nerves must be compelled to look at it. For not to look it is impossible...No purpose is gained by this morbid exhibition, no lesson taught—the painter shows his skill and the spectators' gorge rises at it—that is all." The college now describes it thus: "Today the once maligned picture is celebrated as a great nineteenth-century medical history painting, featuring one of the most superb portraits in American art".

In 1876, Eakins completed a portrait of Dr. John Brinton, surgeon of the Philadelphia Hospital, and famed for his Civil War service. Done in a more informal setting than The Gross Clinic, it was a personal favorite of Eakins, and The Art Journal proclaimed "it is in every respect a more favorable example of this artist's abilities than his much-talked-of composition representing a dissecting room."

Other outstanding examples of his portraits include The Agnew Clinic (1889), Eakins' most important commission and largest painting, which depicted another eminent American surgeon, Dr. David Hayes Agnew, performing a mastectomy; The Dean's Roll Call (1899; image link), featuring Dr. James W. Holland, and Professor Leslie W. Miller (1901; image link), portraits of educators standing as if addressing an audience; a portrait of Frank Hamilton Cushing (c. 1895), in which the prominent ethnologist is seen performing an incantation at the Zuñi pueblo; Professor Henry A. Rowland (1897; image link), a brilliant scientist whose study of spectroscopy revolutionized his field; Antiquated Music (1900), in which Mrs. William D. Frishmuth is shown seated amidst her collection of musical instruments; and The Concert Singer (1890–1892), for which Eakins asked Weda Cook to sing "O rest in the Lord", so that he could study the muscles of her throat and mouth. To replicate the proper deployment of a baton, Eakins enlisted an orchestral conductor to pose for the hand seen in the lower left-hand corner of the painting.

Of Eakins' later portraits, many took as their subjects women who were friends or students. Unlike most portrayals of women at the time, they are devoid of glamor and idealization. For Portrait of Letitia Wilson Jordan (1888; image link), Eakins painted the sitter wearing the same evening dress in which he had seen her at a party. She is a substantial presence, a vision quite different from the era's fashionable portraiture. So, too, his Portrait of Maud Cook (1895), where the obvious beauty of the subject is noted with "a stark objectivity".

The portrait of Miss Amelia Van Buren (c. 1890), a friend and former pupil, suggests the melancholy of a complex personality, and has been called "the finest of all American portraits". Even Susan Macdowell Eakins, a strong painter and former student who married Eakins in 1884, was not sentimentalized: despite its richness of color, The Artist's Wife and His Setter Dog (c. 1884–1889) is a penetratingly candid portrait.

Some of his most vivid portraits resulted from a late series done for the Catholic clergy, which included paintings of a cardinal, archbishops, bishops, and monsignors. As usual, most of the sitters were engaged at Eakins' request, and were given the portraits when Eakins had completed them. In portraits of His Eminence Sebastiano Cardinal Martinelli (1902; image link), Archbishop William Henry Elder (1903), and Monsignor James P. Turner (c. 1906; image link), Eakins took advantage of the brilliant vestments of the offices to animate the compositions in a way not possible in his other male portraits.

Deeply affected by his dismissal from the academy, Eakins focused his later career on portraiture, such as his 1905 Portrait of Professor William S. Forbes. His steadfast insistence on his own vision of realism, in addition to his notoriety from his school scandals, combined to hurt his income in later years. Even as he approached these portraits with the skill of a highly trained anatomist, what is most noteworthy is the intense psychological presence of his sitters. However, it was precisely for this reason that his portraits were often rejected by the sitters or their families. As a result, Eakins came to rely on his friends and family members to model for portraits. His portrait of Walt Whitman (1887–1888) was the poet's favorite.

=== The figure ===
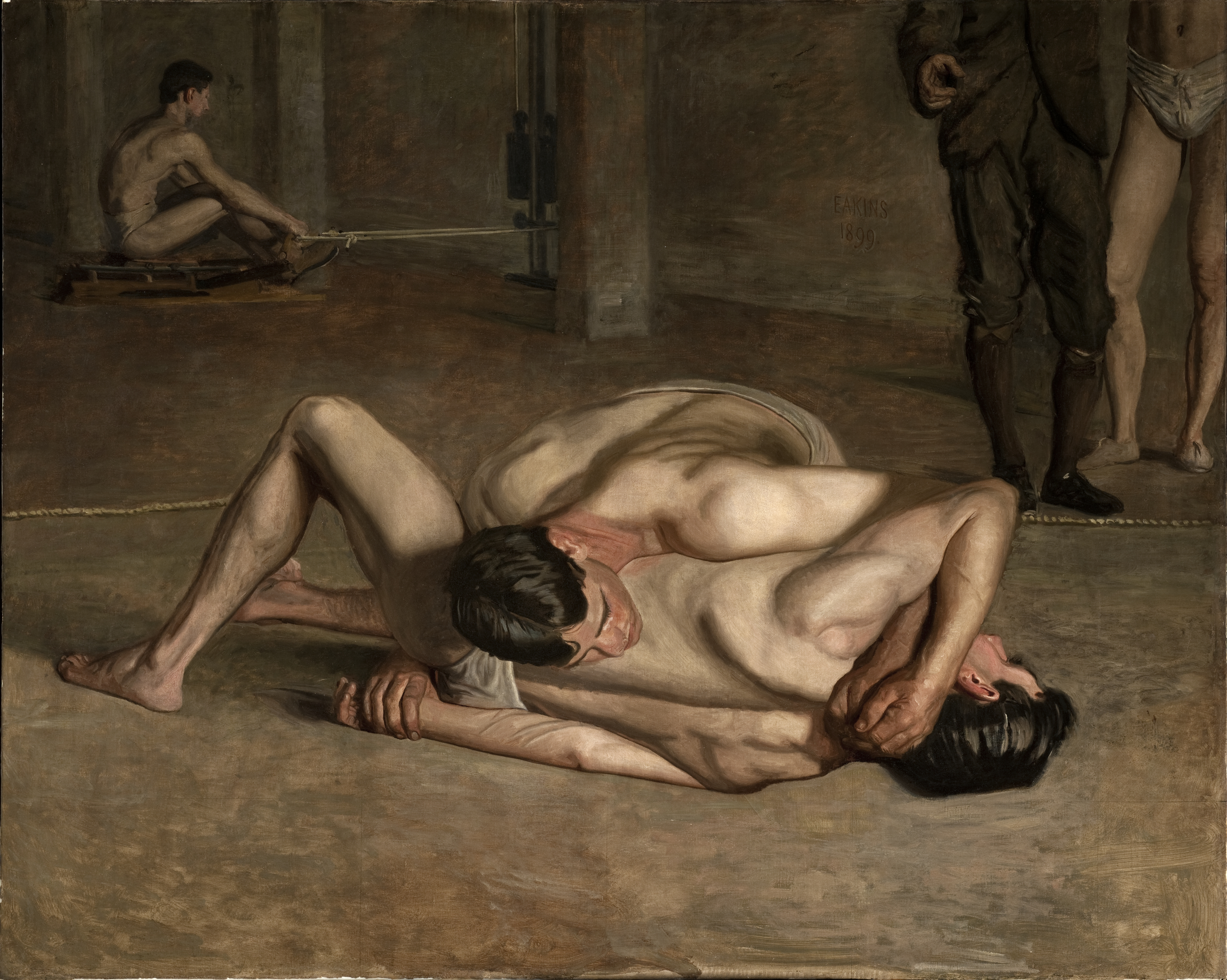
Wrestlers (1899), now housed at the Los Angeles County Museum of Art in Los Angeles

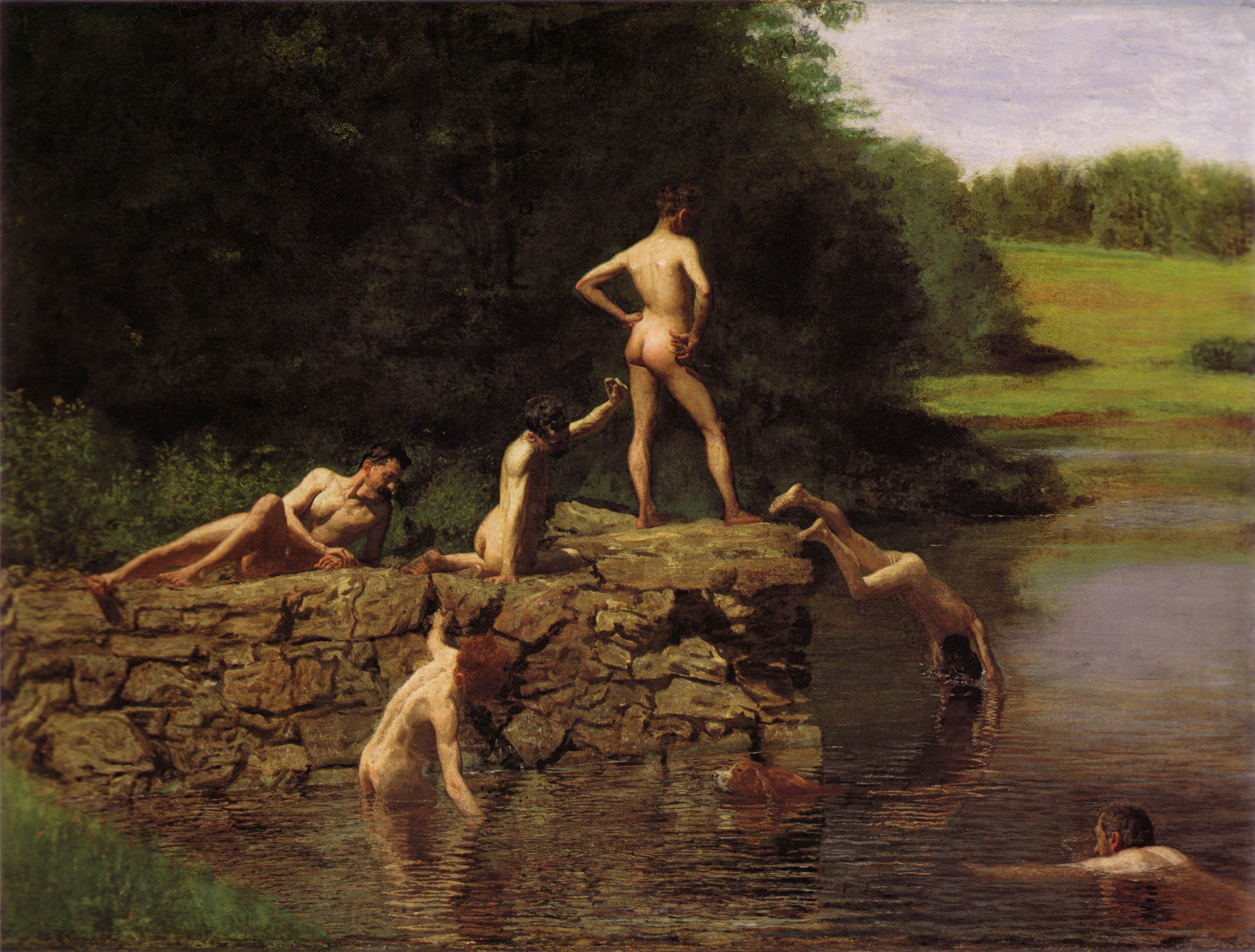
The Swimming Hole (1884–85), now housed at the Amon Carter Museum in Fort Worth, Texas

Eakins' lifelong interest in the figure, nude or nearly so, took several thematic forms. The rowing paintings of the early 1870s constitute the first series of figure studies. In Eakins' largest picture on the subject, The Biglin Brothers Turning the Stake (1873; image link), the muscular dynamism of the body is given its fullest treatment.

In the 1877 painting William Rush and His Model, he painted the female nude as integral to a historical subject, even though there is no evidence that the model who posed for Rush did so in the nude. The Centennial Exhibition of 1876 helped foster a revival in interest in Colonial America and Eakins participated with an ambitious project employing oil studies, wax and wood models, and finally the portrait in 1877. William Rush was a celebrated Colonial sculptor and ship carver, a revered example of an artist-citizen who figured prominently in Philadelphia civic life, and a founder of the Pennsylvania Academy of the Fine Arts, where Eakins started teaching.

Despite his sincerely depicted reverence for Rush, Eakins' treatment of the human body once again drew criticism. This time it was the nude model and her heaped-up clothes depicted front and center, with Rush relegated to the deep shadows in the left background, that stirred dissatisfaction. Nonetheless, Eakins found a subject that referenced his native city and an earlier Philadelphia artist, and allowed for an assay on the female nude seen from behind.

When he returned to the subject many years later, the narrative became more personal: In William Rush and His Model (1908), gone are the chaperon and detailed interior of the earlier work. The professional distance between sculptor and model has been eliminated, and the relationship has become intimate. In one version of the painting from that year, the nude is seen from the front, being helped down from the model stand by an artist who bears a strong resemblance to Eakins.

The Swimming Hole (1884–85) features Eakins' finest studies of the nude, in his most successfully constructed outdoor picture. The figures are those of his friends and students, and include a self-portrait. Although there are photographs by Eakins which relate to the painting, the picture's powerful pyramidal composition and sculptural conception of the individual bodies are completely distinctive pictorial resolutions. The work was painted on commission, but was refused.

In the late 1890s Eakins returned to the male figure, this time in a more urban setting. Taking the Count (1896), a painting of a prizefight, was his second largest canvas, but not his most successful composition. The same may be said of Wrestlers (1899). More successful was Between Rounds (1899), for which boxer Billy Smith posed seated in his corner at Philadelphia's Arena; in fact, all the principal figures were posed by models re-enacting what had been an actual fight. Salutat (1898), a frieze-like composition in which the main figure is isolated, "is one of Eakins' finest achievements in figure-painting."

Although Eakins was agnostic, he painted The Crucifixion in 1880 (image link). Art historian Akela Reason says:

Eakins's selection of this subject has puzzled some art historians who, unable to reconcile what appears to be an anomalous religious image by a reputedly agnostic artist, have related it solely to Eakins's desire for realism, thus divesting the painting of its religious content. Lloyd Goodrich, for example, considered this illustration of Christ's suffering completely devoid of "religious sentiment" and suggested that Eakins intended it simply as a realist study of the male nude body. As a result, art historians have frequently associated 'Crucifixion' (like Swimming) with Eakins's strong interest in anatomy and the nude.

In his later years Eakins persistently asked his female portrait models to pose in the nude, a practice which would have been all but prohibited in conventional Philadelphia society. Inevitably, his desires were frustrated.

== Personal life and marriage ==
The nature of Eakins' sexuality and its impact on his art is a matter of intense scholarly debate. Strong circumstantial evidence points to discussion during Eakins's lifetime that he had homosexual tendencies, and there is little doubt that he was attracted to men, as evidenced in his photography, and three major paintings where male buttocks are a focal point: The Gross Clinic, Salutat, and The Swimming Hole. The last, in which Eakins appears, is increasingly seen as sensuous and autobiographical.

Until recently, major Eakins scholars persistently denied he was homosexual, and such discussion was marginalized. While there is still no consensus, today discussion of homoerotic desire plays a large role in Eakins scholarship. The discovery of a large trove of Eakins' personal papers in 1984 has also driven reassessment of his life.

Eakins met Emily Sartain, daughter of John Sartain, while studying at the academy. Their romance floundered after Eakins moved to Paris to study, and she accused him of immorality. It is likely Eakins had told her of frequenting places where prostitutes assembled. The son of Eakins' physician also reported that Eakins had been "very loose sexually—went to France, where there are no morals, and the French morality suited him to a T".

In 1884, at age 40, Eakins married Susan Hannah Macdowell, the daughter of a Philadelphia engraver. Two years earlier Eakins' sister Margaret, who had acted as his secretary and personal servant, had died of typhoid. It has been suggested that Eakins married to replace her. Macdowell was 25 when Eakins met her at the Hazeltine Gallery where The Gross Clinic was being exhibited in 1875. Unlike many, she was impressed by the controversial painting and she decided to study with him at the academy, which she attended for six years, adopting a sober, realistic style similar to her teacher's. Macdowell was an outstanding student and winner of the Mary Smith Prize for the best painting by a matriculating woman artist.

During their childless marriage, she painted only sporadically and spent most of her time supporting her husband's career, entertaining guests and students, and faithfully backing him in his difficult times with the academy, even when some members of her family aligned against Eakins. She and Eakins shared a passion for photography, both as photographers and subjects, and employed it as a tool for their art. She also posed nude for many of his photos and took images of him. Both had separate studios in their home. After Eakins' death in 1916, she returned to painting, adding considerably to her output right up to the 1930s, in a style that became warmer, looser, and brighter in tone. She died in 1938. Thirty-five years after her death, in 1973, she had her first one-woman exhibition at the Pennsylvania Academy of the Fine Arts.

In the latter years of his life, Eakins' constant companion was the sculptor Samuel Murray, who shared his interest in boxing and bicycling. The evidence suggests the relationship was more emotionally important to Eakins than that with his wife.

Throughout his life, Eakins appears to have been drawn to those who were mentally vulnerable and then preyed upon those weaknesses. Several of his students ended their lives in insanity.

== Death and legacy ==
Eakins died on June 25, 1916, at the age of 71 and is buried at The Woodlands cemetery near the University of Pennsylvania in West Philadelphia.

Late in life Eakins did experience some recognition. In 1902, he was made a National Academician. In 1914, the sale of a portrait study of D. Hayes Agnew for The Agnew Clinic to Dr. Albert C. Barnes precipitated much publicity when rumors circulated that the selling price was fifty thousand dollars. In fact, Barnes bought the painting for four thousand dollars.

In the year after his death, Eakins was honored with a memorial retrospective at the Metropolitan Museum of Art, and in 1917–18 the Pennsylvania Academy followed suit. Susan Macdowell Eakins did much to preserve his reputation, including giving the Philadelphia Museum of Art more than fifty of her husband's oil paintings. After her death in 1938, other works were sold off, and eventually another large collection of art and personal material was purchased by Joseph Hirshhorn, and now is part of the Hirshhorn Museum's collection. Since then, Eakins' home in North Philadelphia was put on the National Register of Historic Places list in 1966, and Eakins Oval, across from the Philadelphia Museum of Art on the Benjamin Franklin Parkway, was named for the artist. In 1967 The Biglin Brothers Racing (1872) was reproduced on a United States postage stamp. His work was also part of the painting event in the art competition at the 1932 Summer Olympics.

Eakins' attitude toward realism in painting, and his desire to explore the heart of American life proved influential. He taught hundreds of students, among them his future wife Susan Macdowell, African-American painter Henry Ossawa Tanner, and Thomas Anshutz, who taught, in turn, Robert Henri, George Luks, John Sloan, and Everett Shinn, future members of the Ashcan School, and other realists and artistic heirs to Eakins' philosophy. Though his is not a household name, and though during his lifetime Eakins struggled to make a living from his work, today he is regarded as one of the most important American artists of any period.

Since the 1990s, Eakins has emerged as a major figure in sexuality studies in art history, for both the homoeroticism of his male nudes and for the complexity of his attitudes toward women. Controversy shaped much of his career as a teacher and as an artist. He insisted on teaching men and women "the same", used nude male models in female classes and vice versa, and was accused of abusing female students.

Recent scholarship suggests that these scandals were grounded in more than the "puritanical prudery" of his contemporaries—as had once been assumed—and that Eakins' progressive academic principles may have protected unconscious and dubious agendas. These controversies may have been caused by a combination of factors such as the bohemianism of Eakins and his circle (in which students, for example, sometimes modeled in the nude for each other), the intensity and authority of his teaching style, and Eakins' inclination toward unorthodox or provocative behavior.

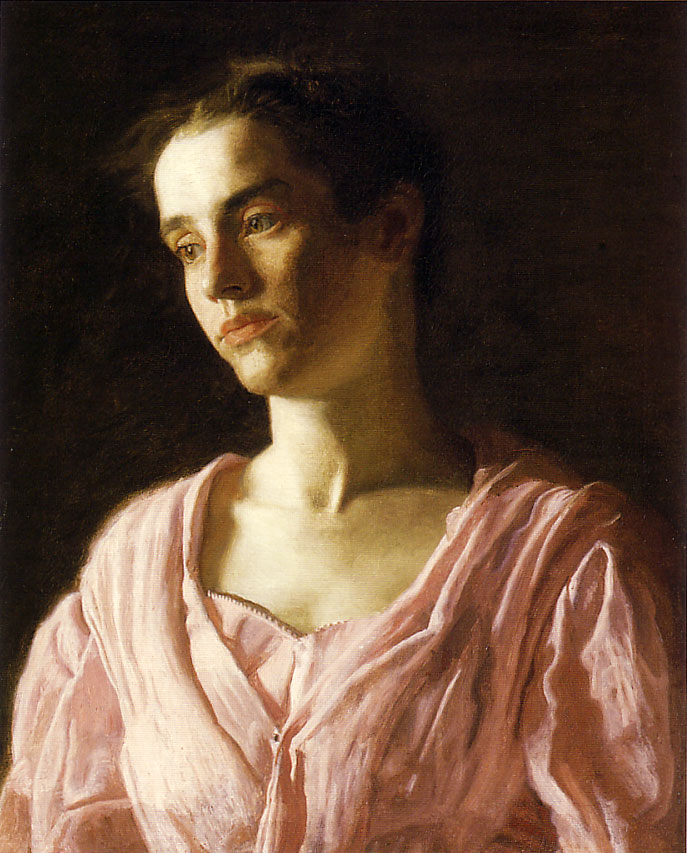
Portrait of Maud Cook (1895), Yale University Art Gallery

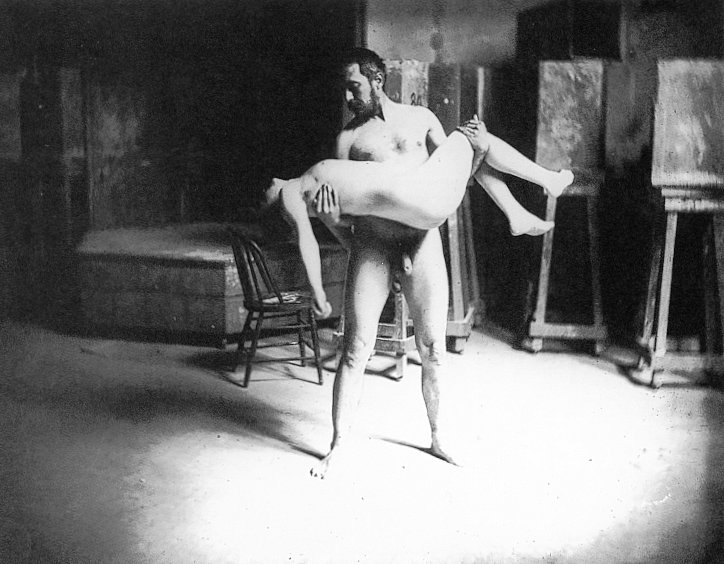
Thomas Eakins Carrying a Woman, 1885. Photograph, circle of Eakins

=== Disposition of estate ===
Eakins was unable to sell many of his works during his lifetime, so when he died in 1916, a large body of artwork passed to his widow, Susan Macdowell Eakins. She carefully preserved it, donating some of the strongest pieces to various museums. When she in turn died in 1938, much of the remaining artistic estate was destroyed or damaged by executors, and the remainders were belatedly salvaged by a former Eakins student. For more details, see the article "List of works by Thomas Eakins".

On November 11, 2006, the board of trustees at Thomas Jefferson University agreed to sell The Gross Clinic to the National Gallery of Art in Washington, DC, and the Crystal Bridges Museum of American Art in Bentonville, Arkansas, for a record $68 million, the highest price for an Eakins painting as well as a record price for an individual American-made portrait. On December 21, 2006, a group of donors agreed to match the price to keep the painting in Philadelphia. It is displayed alternately at the Philadelphia Museum of Art and at the Pennsylvania Academy of Fine Arts.

== Assessment ==
On October 29, 1917, Robert Henri wrote an open letter to the Art Students League about Eakins:

Thomas Eakins was a man of great character. He was a man of iron will and his will to paint and to carry out his life as he thought it should go. This he did. It cost him heavily but in his works we have the precious result of his independence, his generous heart and his big mind. Eakins was a deep student of life, and with a great love he studied humanity frankly. He was not afraid of what his study revealed to him. In the matter of ways and means of expression, the science of technique, he studied most profoundly, as only a great master would have the will to study. His vision was not touched by fashion. He struggled to apprehend the constructive force in nature and to employ in his works the principles found. His quality was honesty. "Integrity" is the word which seems best to fit him. Personally I consider him the greatest portrait painter America has produced.

In 1982, in his two-volume Eakins biography, art historian Lloyd Goodrich wrote:

In spite of limitations—and what artist is free of them?—Eakins' achievement was monumental. He was our first major painter to accept completely the realities of contemporary urban America, and from them to create powerful, profound art... In portraiture alone Eakins was the strongest American painter since Copley, with equal substance and power, and added penetration, depth, and subtlety.

John Canaday, art critic for The New York Times, wrote in 1964:

As a supreme realist, Eakins appeared heavy and vulgar to a public that thought of art, and culture in general, largely in terms of a graceful sentimentality. Today he seems to us to have recorded his fellow Americans with a perception that was often as tender as it was vigorous, and to have preserved for us the essence of an American life which, indeed, he did not idealize—because it seemed to him beautiful beyond the necessity of idealization.

In 2010, the American painter Philip Pearlstein published an article in ARTnews suggesting the strong influences Eadweard Muybridge's work and public lectures had on 20th-century artists, including Degas, Rodin, Seurat, Duchamp, and Eakins, either directly or through the contemporaneous work of their fellow photographic pioneer, Étienne-Jules Marey. He concluded:

I believe that both Muybridge and Eakins—as a photographer—should be recognized as among the most influential artists on the ideas of 20th-century art, along with Cézanne, whose lessons in fractured vision provided the technical basis for putting those ideas together.

== See also ==
- List of American artists before 1900
- List of painters by name beginning with "E"
- List of people from Philadelphia
- List of works by Thomas Eakins
- Visual art of the United States

== Works cited ==
- Adams, Henry (2005). Eakins Revealed: The Secret Life of an American Artist. Oxford University Press. ISBN 0-19-515668-4.
- Brookman, Philip; Braun, Marta; Keller, Corey; Solnit, Rebecca; Grundberg, Andy (2010). Helios: Eadweard Muybridge in a Time of Change. Steidl. ISBN 978-3-86521-926-8.
- Foster, Kathleen A.; Tucker, Mark S., eds. (2012). An Eakins Masterpiece Restored: Seeing the Gross Clinic Anew. Philadelphia Museum of Art. ISBN 978-0-300-17979-8.
- Gaze, Delia, ed. (1997). Dictionary of Women Artists. Vol. II. Fitzroy Dearborn Publishers. ISBN 978-1-884964-21-3.
- Reason, Akela (2010). Thomas Eakins and the Uses of History. University of Pennsylvania Press. ISBN 978-0-8122-4198-3.
- Sewelll, Darrel (2001). Thomas Eakins. Yale University Press. ISBN 0-87633-143-6.
- Werbel, Amy Beth (2007). Thomas Eakins: Art, Medicine, and Sexuality in Nineteenth-century Philadelphia. Yale University Press. ISBN 978-0-300-11655-7.
- Wilmerding, John (1993). Thomas Eakins. Smithsonian Institution Press. ISBN 1560983132.
