= List of painters by name beginning with "E" =

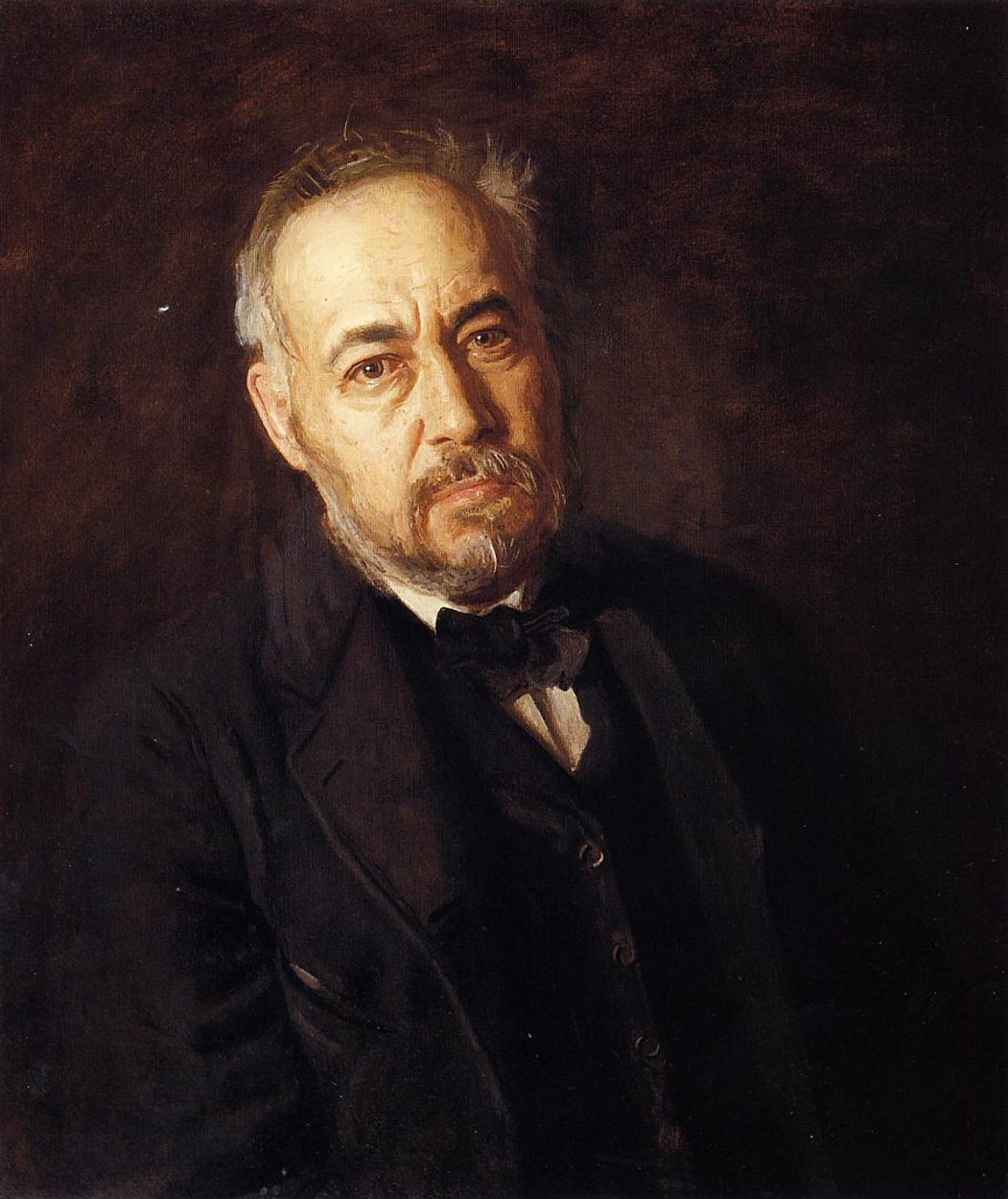
Thomas Eakins

Please add names of notable painters with a Wikipedia page, in precise English alphabetical order, using U.S. spelling conventions. Country and regional names refer to where painters worked for long periods, not to personal allegiances.

- Aileen Eagleton (1902–1984), English painter
- Thomas Eakins (1844–1916), American realist painter, photographer, sculptor and fine arts educator
- Ralph Earl (1751–1801), American portrait painter
- Augustus Earle (1793–1838), English traveling artist
- Alfred East (1849–1913), English painter
- Christoffer Wilhelm Eckersberg (1783–1853), Danish painter
- Otto Eckmann (1865–1902), German painter and graphic artist
- Don Eddy (born 1944), American painter and photo-realist
- Albert Edelfelt (1854–1905), Finnish painter
- Denis Eden (1878–1949), English painter and illustrator
- Ursula Edgcumbe (1900–1985), English sculptor and painter
- Edith Edmonds (1874–1951), English still-life and landscape painter
- Robert Edmonstone (1794–1834), Scottish painter and draftsman
- May de Montravel Edwardes (1887–1967), English painter and miniaturist
- Helen Edwards (1882–1963), English landscape painter
- John Uzzell Edwards (1934–2014), Welsh painter
- Gerbrand van den Eeckhout (1621–1674), Dutch painter
- Camilo Egas (1889–1962), Ecuadorian/American painter and teacher
- Maude Kaufman Eggemeyer (1877–1959) American painter
- Albin Egger-Lienz (1868–1926), Austrian painter of rustic and historical paintings
- József Egry (1883–1951), Hungarian painter
- Ei-Q (瑛九, 1911–1960), Japanese artist, photographer and engraver
- Louis Eilshemius (1864–1941), American painter
- Einar Hakonarson (born 1945), Icelandic painter
- Eishōsai Chōki (栄松斎長喜, fl. 1786–1808), Japanese woodblock print designer
- Ib Eisner (1925–2003), Danish artist
- Eizan Kikukawa (菊川英山, 1787–1867) Japanese woodblock print designer
- Bouchta El Hayani (born 1952), Moroccan painter
- Mildred Eldridge (1909–1991), English painter, muralist and illustrator
- Ken Elias (born 1944), Welsh artist
- Pieter Janssens Elinga (1623–1682), Dutch painter
- Harold Elliott (1890–1968), Canadian painter
- Clifford Ellis (1907–1985), English painter, print-maker and art teacher
- Adam Elsheimer (1578–1610), German artist of cabinet paintings
- Arthur Webster Emerson (1885–1968), American painter
- Tracey Emin (born 1963), English painter, draftsman and sculptor
- Paul Emmert (1826–1867), Swiss/American artist and print-maker
- Lydia Field Emmet (1866–1952), American portrait painter
- Rosalie Emslie (1891–1977), English landscape and portrait painter
- Axel Ender (1853–1920), Norwegian painter and sculptor
- Cornelis Engebrechtsz (1462–1527), Dutch painter
- Florence Engelbach (1872–1951), English portrait and landscape painter
- Grace English (1891–1956), English painter and etcher
- Ron English (born 1948), American artist of brand imagery
- Carlos Enríquez Gómez (1900–1957), Cuban painter, illustrator and writer
- James Ensor (1860–1949), Belgian painter and print-maker
- Ben Enwonwu (1921–1994), Nigerian painter and sculptor
- Sir Jacob Epstein (1880–1959), American/English sculptor
- Sven Erixson (1899–1970), Swedish painter and sculptor
- Hans Erni (born 1909), Swiss graphic designer, painter and engraver
- Max Ernst (1891–1976), German painter, sculptor, graphic artist, and poet
- Rodolfo Escalera (1929–2000), Mexican artist and plate collector
- M. C. Escher (1898–1972), Dutch graphic artist
- Andrey Esionov (born 1963), Russian painter and graphic artist
- Robert Lee Eskridge (1891–1975), American genre painter, muralist and illustrator
- Jacob Esselens (1626–1687), Dutch landscape painter
- Richard Estes (born 1936), American artist and photo-realist painter
- Bracha L. Ettinger (born 1948), Israeli/French painter and writer
- William Etty (1787–1849), English history painter
- Bernard Walter Evans (1843–1922), British landscape painter
- Cerith Wyn Evans (born 1958), Welsh artist, sculptor and film-maker
- Dulah Marie Evans (1875–1951), American painter, print-maker and etcher
- Vincent Evans (1896–1976), Welsh painter, print-maker and art teacher
- Eamon Everall (born 1948), English artist and educator
- Allaert van Everdingen (1621–1675) Dutch painter and print-maker
- Caesar van Everdingen (1617–1678), Dutch portrait and history painter
- Philip Evergood (1901–1971), American artist, sculptor and writer
- Mikhail Evstafiev (born 1963), Soviet/Russian artist, photographer and writer
- Peter Maxwell Ewart (1918–2001), Canadian painter
- Julius Exner (1863–1939), Danish genre painter
- Barthélemy d'Eyck (1420–after 1470), Netherlandish/French artist and manuscript illuminator
- Hubert van Eyck (1385–1426), Netherlandish painter
- Jan van Eyck (1390–1441), Netherlandish painter
- John Eyre (1771–1812), Australian painter and engraver
- Annabel Eyres (born 1965), English print-maker and painter
- Carl Eytel (1862–1925), German/American landscape painter and illustrator
