= Salutat =

Painting by Thomas Eakins

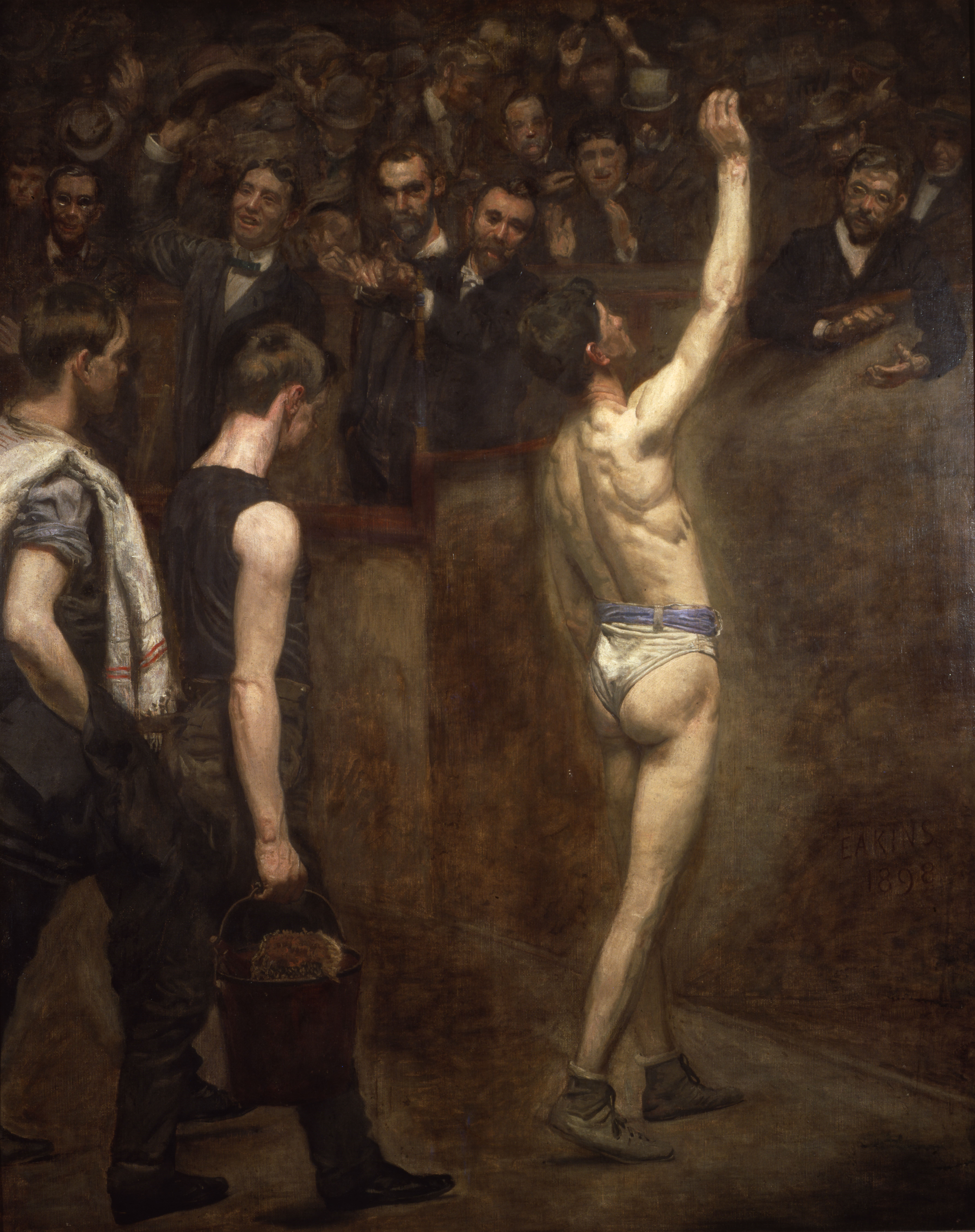
- Artist: Thomas Eakins
- Year: 1898
- Medium: Oil on canvas
- Dimensions: 126.4 cm × 101.0 cm (49 3/4 in × 39 3/4 in)
- Location: Addison Gallery of American Art; Andover

Salutat is an 1898 painting by Thomas Eakins (1844–1916). Based on a real-life boxing match that occurred in 1898, the work depicts a boxer waving to the crowd after the match. According to Eakins' biographer Lloyd Goodrich, Salutat is "one of Eakins' finest achievements in figure-painting." The painting's title is Latin for "He greets" or "He salutes."

== Background ==
Much as he had with his paintings of rowers in the 1870s, during the late 1890s Eakins turned his interest again to the male nude, this time depicting prizefighters. Eakins attended fights in 1898, and aided by sportswriters Clarence Cranmer and Henry Walter Schlichter, met with and hired fighters to pose for him.

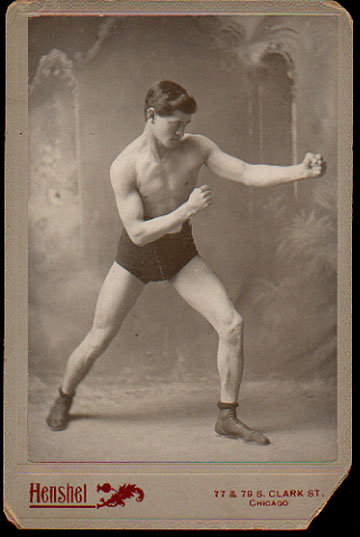
A postcard of Billy Smith, circa 1900

The studio became a place to spar; according to Eakins's protégé the sculptor Samuel Murray, (who in 1899 made a bronze statue of Billy Smith) one of the fighters, Ellwood McCloskey, would "round up fellow pugilists who had promised to pose but didn't show up":

"Hey, you son of a bitch, haven't you got a date to pose for Mr. Eakins? Come on now, or I'll punch your goddamn head off."

"Turkey Point" Billy Smith, a featherweight who competed in over 100 bouts over the course of ten years and fought two featherweight champions, was the protagonist for Salutat as well as for Between Rounds.

== Studies ==
Eakins made multiple studies of the subject. A pencil-on-paper study was purchased by Joseph Hirshhorn in 1965 and donated to his eponymous museum in 1966.

Eakins also completed an oil-on-canvas study, which he gave to art critic Sadakichi Hartmann after Hartmann praised Eakins in his 1901 book A History of American Art. (This was the first time Eakins had been recognized as being of historic importance.) This study is now in the possession of the Carnegie Museum of Art.

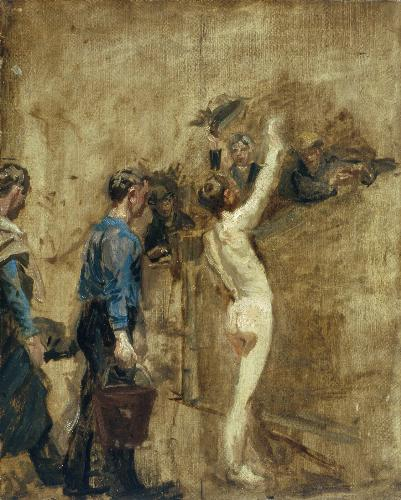
Oil-on-canvas study for Salutat, 1898, 20 1/8 x 16 1/8 inches; 51 x 41 cm., Carnegie Museum of Art, Pittsburgh, Pennsylvania

== Composition ==
Salutat, Between Rounds (a portion of which was executed separately as Billy Smith) and Taking the Count are a series of three large boxing paintings done by Eakins. The former two depict events surrounding a boxing match that took place on April 22, 1898. Featherweight Tim Callahan fought featherweight Billy Smith in a match that was close until the final round, when Callahan gained the advantage and won the fight. However, for Salutat, Eakins chose to depict Smith as the winner. In the work, Smith raises his hand to salute the audience, in the style of a gladiator. On the painting's original frame Eakins carved the words "DEXTRA VICTRICE CONCLAMANTES SALVTAT" (With the victorious right hand, he salutes those shouting [their approval]).

As with a number of other Eakins works, the rendering of the figures is extremely precise, such that it has allowed art historians to identify individual members of the audience. While working on the boxing pictures, friends would visit the studio, and Eakins invited them to "stay a while and I'll put you in the picture." For Salutat, audience members include Eakins's friend Louis Kenton (wearing eyeglasses and a bow tie), sportswriter Clarence Cranmer (wearing a bowler hat), David Jordan (brother of Letitia Wilson Jordan, whom Eakins painted in Portrait of Letitia Wilson Jordan), photographer Louis Husson (next to Jordan), Eakins's student Samuel Murray, and Eakins's father Benjamin Eakins.

Smith is bathed in soft white light, which illuminates his muscles. Amid a general tonality of warm grays and browns that contains no strong chromatic notes, the skin tones of the three main figures are pale. All three men have the quality of relief sculpture, and with Smith's figure separate from those of his seconds, they appear to move across the canvas in an arrangement reminiscent of a frieze.

== Exhibition and provenance ==
Eakins sent the painting to the Annual of the Pennsylvania Academy in January 1899, and although it "failed to please the few critics who noticed it", he exhibited the picture a total of four times in the next five years.

The painting remained unsold during Eakins's lifetime, and was bought from his widow by Thomas Cochran in 1929; he subsequently donated the picture to the Addison Gallery of American Art at Phillips Academy in Andover, Massachusetts.

== See also ==
- List of works by Thomas Eakins

== Sources ==
- Henry Adams. Eakins Revealed: the Secret Life of an American Artist. Oxford University Press US, 2005. ISBN 0-19-515668-4.
- Martin A. Berger. Man Made: Thomas Eakins and the Construction of Gilded Age Manhood. Berkeley: University of California Press, 2000.
- Lloyd Goodrich. Thomas Eakins. Harvard University Press, 1982. ISBN 0-674-88490-6
- Sidney Kirkpatrick. The Revenge of Thomas Eakins. Yale University Press, 2006. ISBN 0-300-10855-9
- Christian K. Messenger. Sport and the Spirit of Play in American fiction: Hawthorne to Faulkner. Columbia University Press, 1981. ISBN 0-231-05168-9
- Sewell, Darrel; et al. Thomas Eakins. Yale University Press, 2001. ISBN 0-87633-143-6
