= Thomas Eakins House =

Historic house in Pennsylvania, United States

- U.S. National Register of Historic Places
- U.S. National Historic Landmark
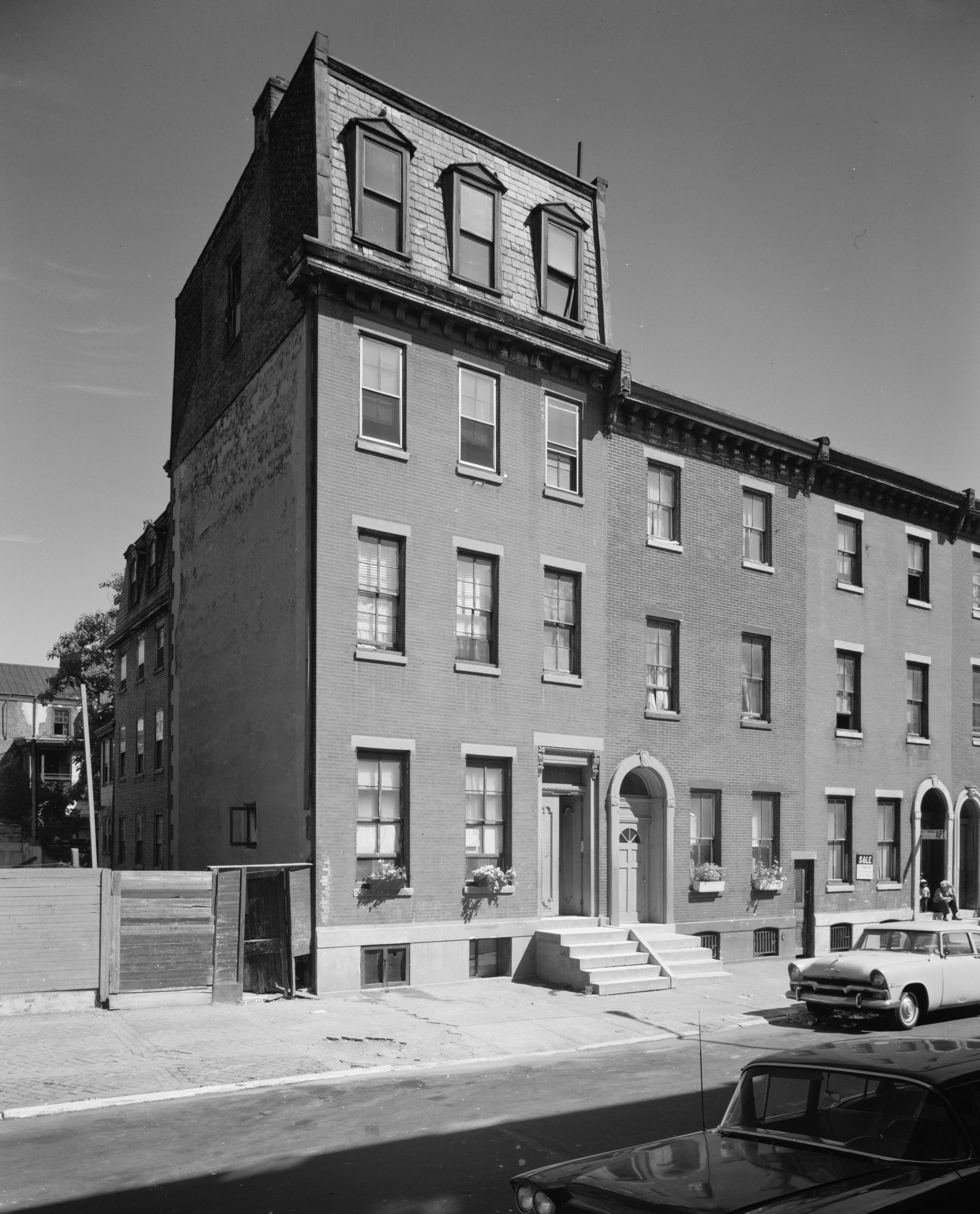
- Thomas Eakins House
- Location: 1729 Mount Vernon Street; Philadelphia, Pennsylvania
- Coordinates: 39°57′56″N 75°10′2″W
- Area: 0.1 acres (0.040 ha)
- Built: c. 1854
- NRHP reference No.: 66000679

Significant dates
- Added to NRHP: December 21, 1965
- Designated NHL: December 21, 1965

The Thomas Eakins House is a historic house at 1727-29 Mount Vernon Street in the Spring Garden section of Philadelphia, Pennsylvania, US. Built about 1854, it was for most of his life the home of Thomas Eakins (1844-1916), one of the most influential American artists of the late 19th century. It was designated a National Historic Landmark in 1965, and is now home to a local artist cooperative.

== Description and history ==
The Thomas Eakins House is located north of downtown Philadelphia, on the north side of Mount Vernon Street between North 18th and 17th Streets in the city's Spring Garden neighborhood. It is a four-story rowhouse, its first three stories brick and the fourth floor of wood-frame construction. The front facade is three bays wide, with the main entrance in the right bay. Windows are set in rectangular openings, with simple marble sills and lintels.

The rowhouse was built about 1854 for Benjamin Eakins, father of the artist. Benjamin Eakins added the fourth story in 1874 as a studio for his son. Thomas Eakins inherited the house in 1899, and lived there until his death in 1916. Eakins was a leading figure in the development of realism in painting, and an innovator in the use of photography for artistic purposes. He also taught a generation of artists at the Pennsylvania Academy of the Fine Arts, where he introduced new techniques for studying and painting the human form. Many of his portrait subjects are from all walks of life in Philadelphia, his lifelong home.

The Mural Arts Program, a Philadelphia-based art program that creates outdoor murals, is currently based in the Thomas Eakins house.

== See also ==
- List of National Historic Landmarks in Philadelphia
- National Register of Historic Places listings in North Philadelphia
