= The Concert Singer =

Painting by Thomas Eakins

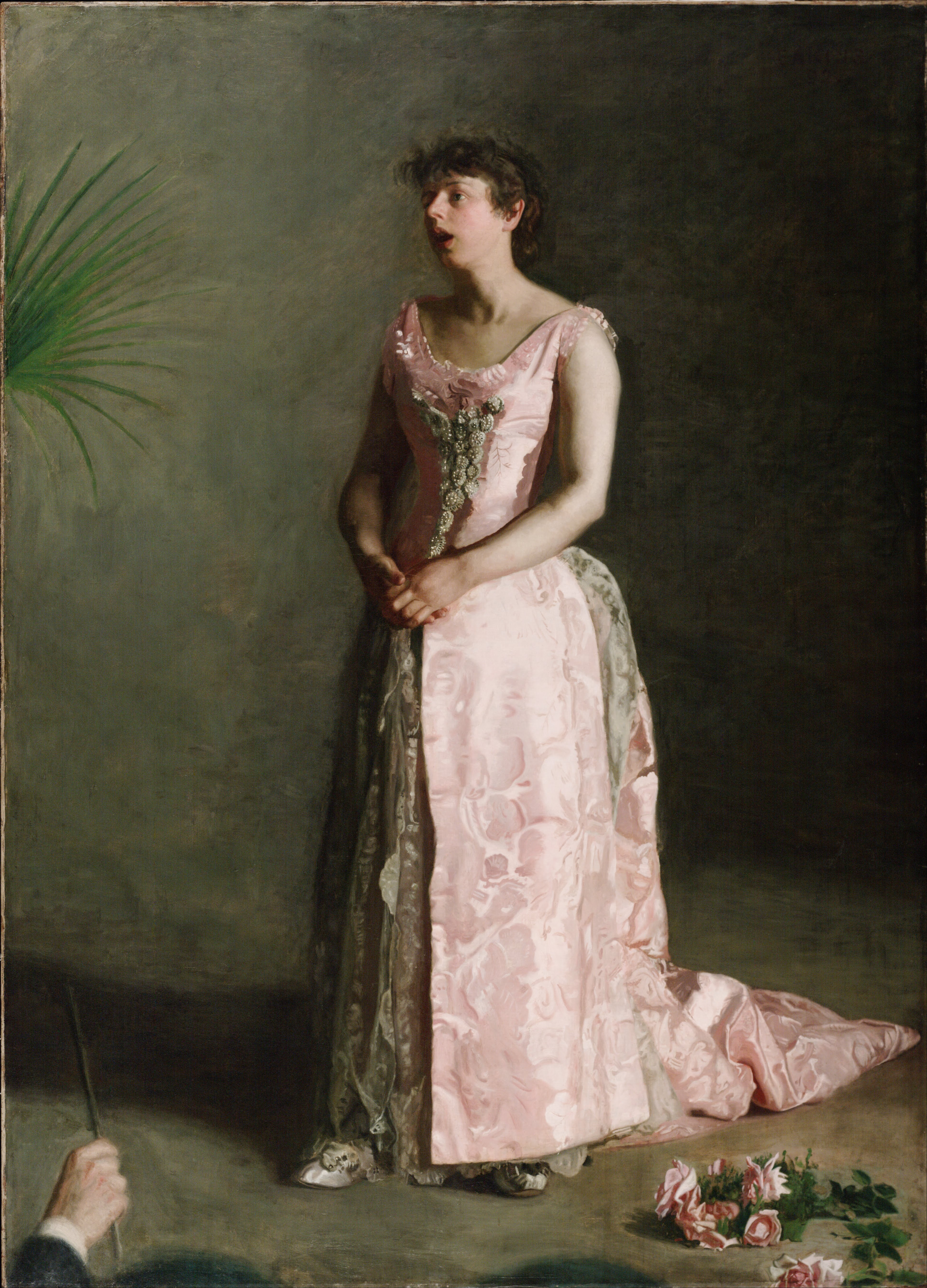
- Artist: Thomas Eakins
- Year: 1890–1892
- Medium: Oil on canvas
- Dimensions: 191.4 cm × 138.1 cm (75 1/8 in × 54 1/4 in)
- Location: Philadelphia Museum of Art; Philadelphia

The Concert Singer is a painting by the American artist Thomas Eakins (1844–1916), depicting the singer Weda Cook (1867–1937). The work, commenced in 1890 and completed in 1892, was Eakins's first full-length portrait of a woman. It is now in the Philadelphia Museum of Art.

The Concert Singer was one of a series of portraits Eakins painted of Philadelphia natives who were prominent in science and culture, with the intent of producing major showpieces for exhibition. The painting exemplifies Eakins's desire to truthfully record visual appearances with "historical value".

Eakins drew, painted, or sculpted at least twenty-two works that dealt with the visual aspects of music; at one point, this included "eleven straight portraits of musicians and musicologists", of which The Concert Singer has been called "the finest".

== Composition ==
The work depicts Weda Cook, a "respected Camden vocalist ... recognized for her 'powerful contralto voice, unassuming manner, and thorough training.'" She stands center stage, wearing pink slippers and a low-necked sleeveless pink dress, a luminous and central element in the picture, fringed with lace and pearl beads. Eakins's realism is notable in the painting of skin tones, with Cook's bare neck, chest, arms, and shoulders visibly paler than her head and hands. The figure is solidly and subtly modeled, its warm light pinks set against a cooler and darker yellow-green background. Narrative details are minimal. In the lower-left foreground, a conductor's hand and baton are visible, although the rest of the figure is not pictured. Initially, as can be seen in the preliminary sketch, the hand grasped the baton as if it were a paint brush. For verisimilitude Eakins had Charles M. Schmitz, the conductor of the Germania Orchestra and Cook's teacher, pose holding the baton. A bouquet at the lower right suggests that the singer is performing an encore; apparently a fresh supply of roses was provided at each sitting by the sculptor William Rudolf O'Donovan, who had fallen in love with Cook.

The floor on which Cook stands recedes into an ambiguous background, and despite several anecdotal elements, the painting is "remarkably barren", though with enough information to suggest a public performance. Inconsistencies in perspective add to the ambiguity. The lower part of the dress, shoes, and flowers are depicted as if seen from above, yet the visibility of the soles of the shoes and underside of the dress suggest a lower vantage point.

The austerity of the composition marks a new and more abstract tendency in Eakins's work, presaging the increasing sense of isolation that would be characteristic of his later portraits. In its design, cropping of details at the lower edges, and low angle of vision, John Wilmerding has likened the painting to the music and dance interiors of Eakins's contemporary, Edgar Degas. Despite formal similarities between The Concert Singer and works by Eakins's French contemporaries, there is a difference in mood: Degas' singers work in cafes, their glamor undercut by garish lighting, and Daumier's essays of the theme are more cynical still. In contrast, the Eakins painting reflects an American appreciation for singing as a manifestation of high culture. Unidealized, Weda Cook's figure is depicted as substantial and sensuous. It is revealed by a light that creates form, depth, and produces "the painting's profoundly poetic mood".

== Compositional history ==
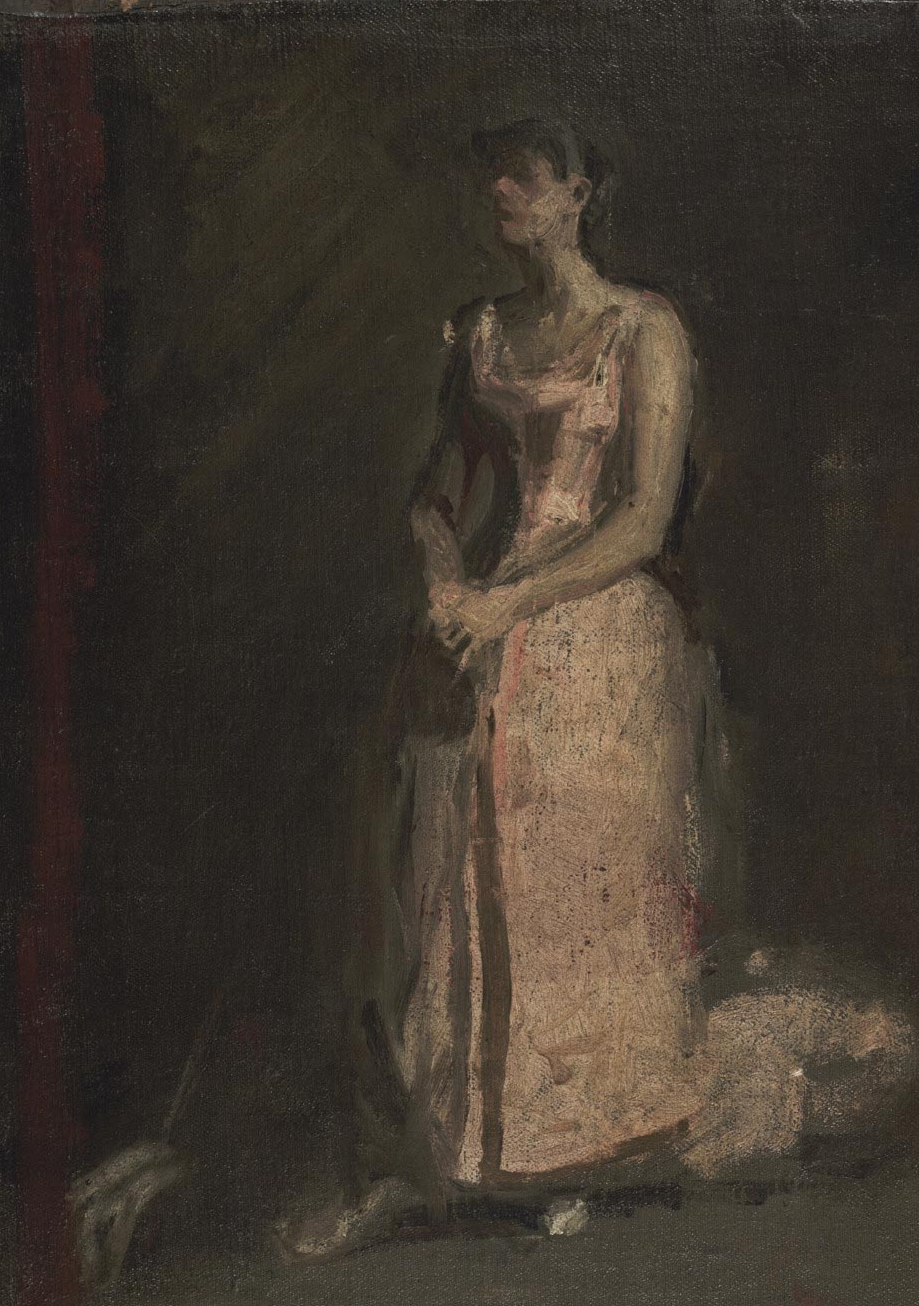
Sketch for The Concert Singer, c. 1890. Oil on canvas, 35.6 cm × 27 cm (13 3/4 in × 10 3/8 in). Philadelphia Museum of Art.

It is possible that Eakins first saw Cook perform at the Art Students League of Philadelphia on February 22, 1889, and was inspired to paint The Concert Singer after seeing a photograph of Jules Massenet at an organ, with his wife open-mouthed, singing. Though anonymous female (and angel) singers were often shown with their mouths open in medieval and Renaissance art—as well as in later works such as Degas's Singer with a Glove, 1878—named singing artists were nearly always painted and photographed with their mouths closed at this period. So, like many Eakins portraits, The Concert Singer had an element of daring in its composition, although the mouth is not shown fully open.

Prior to painting The Concert Singer, Eakins made a small oil sketch, now also in the Philadelphia Museum of Art. Although the sketch lacks the palm and roses, essential compositional modes are already in place, with emphasis on Cook's neck, the color of the dress, direction of light, and general design.

It took Eakins nearly two years to paint The Concert Singer. Cook posed for him numerous times, three or four times a week for the first year. Each time she did, Eakins asked her to sing "O rest in the Lord" from Felix Mendelssohn's Elijah so he could observe her throat movements; the portrait's specificity is such that some scholars have interpreted Cook as being shown in the act of "forming the e sound in the word rest." The opening bars of the aria are carved in the wooden frame of the painting. Eakins later wrote: "I once painted a concert singer and on the chestnut frame I carved the opening bars of Mendelssohn's 'Rest in the Lord.' It was ornamental unobtrusive and to musicians I think it emphasized the expression of the face and pose of the figure." This was a practice Eakins also implemented in his Portrait of Professor Henry A. Rowland, in which the painting of the physicist was shown in a frame made by the artist, with carvings of symbols and formulas related to Rowland's work.

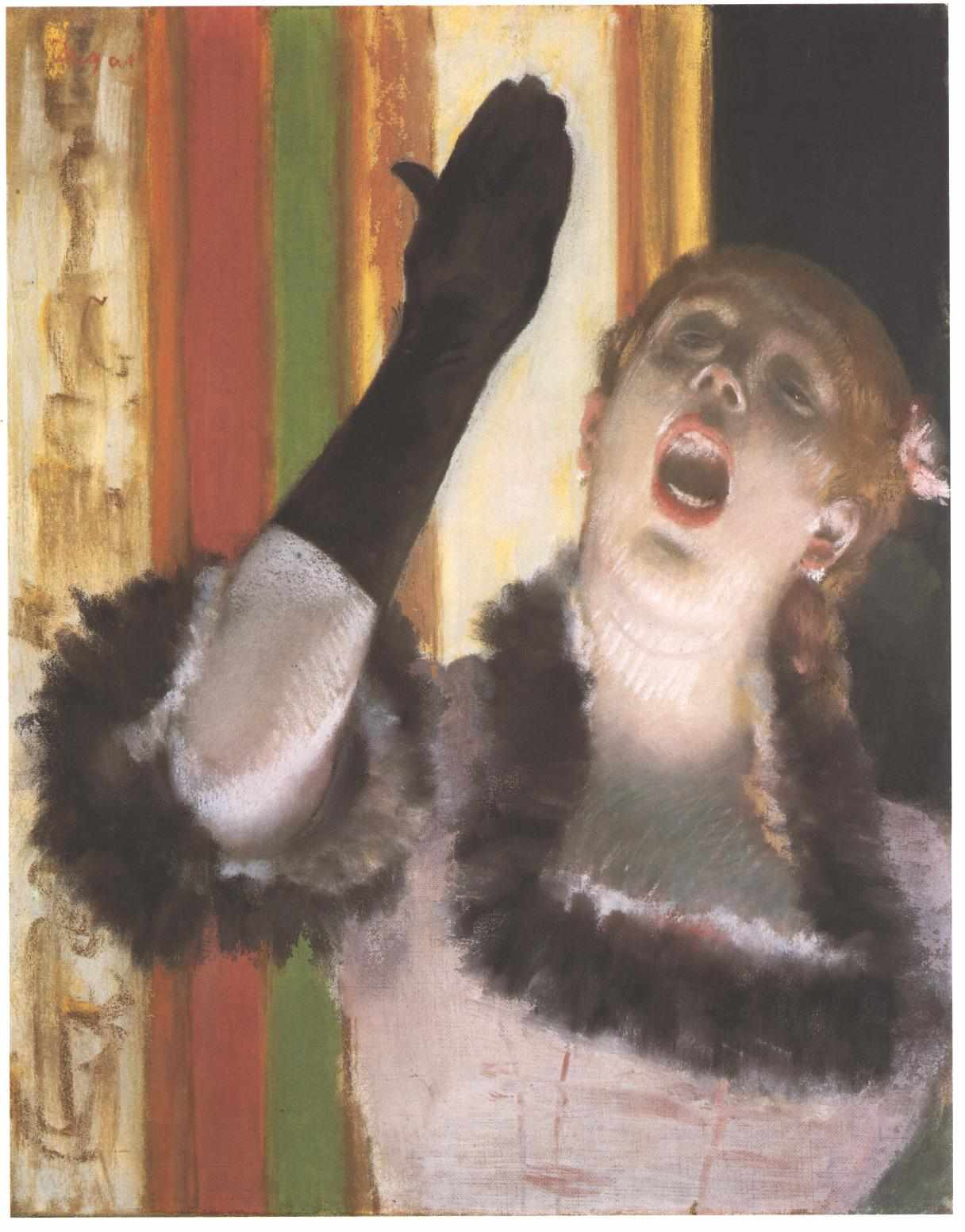
Edgar Degas, Singer with a Glove, 1878. "With its flattened design....one thinks of the parallel constructions of Edgar Degas's dance and orchestra subjects of the same period."

The Concert Singer has been interpreted as a tribute to the poet Walt Whitman, who was warmly admired by both Eakins and Cook, and who was in his final illness at the time the painting was made. Eakins had met the poet in 1887, and completed a portrait of him the following year. Weda Cook had set some of Whitman's poems to music, and often performed for him. "O rest in the Lord" was a particular favorite of the poet, who asked Cook to sing it for him every time they met. Whitman was never far from the thoughts of artist and model as the work progressed; Cook later recalled that Eakins quoted verses from Whitman while she posed.

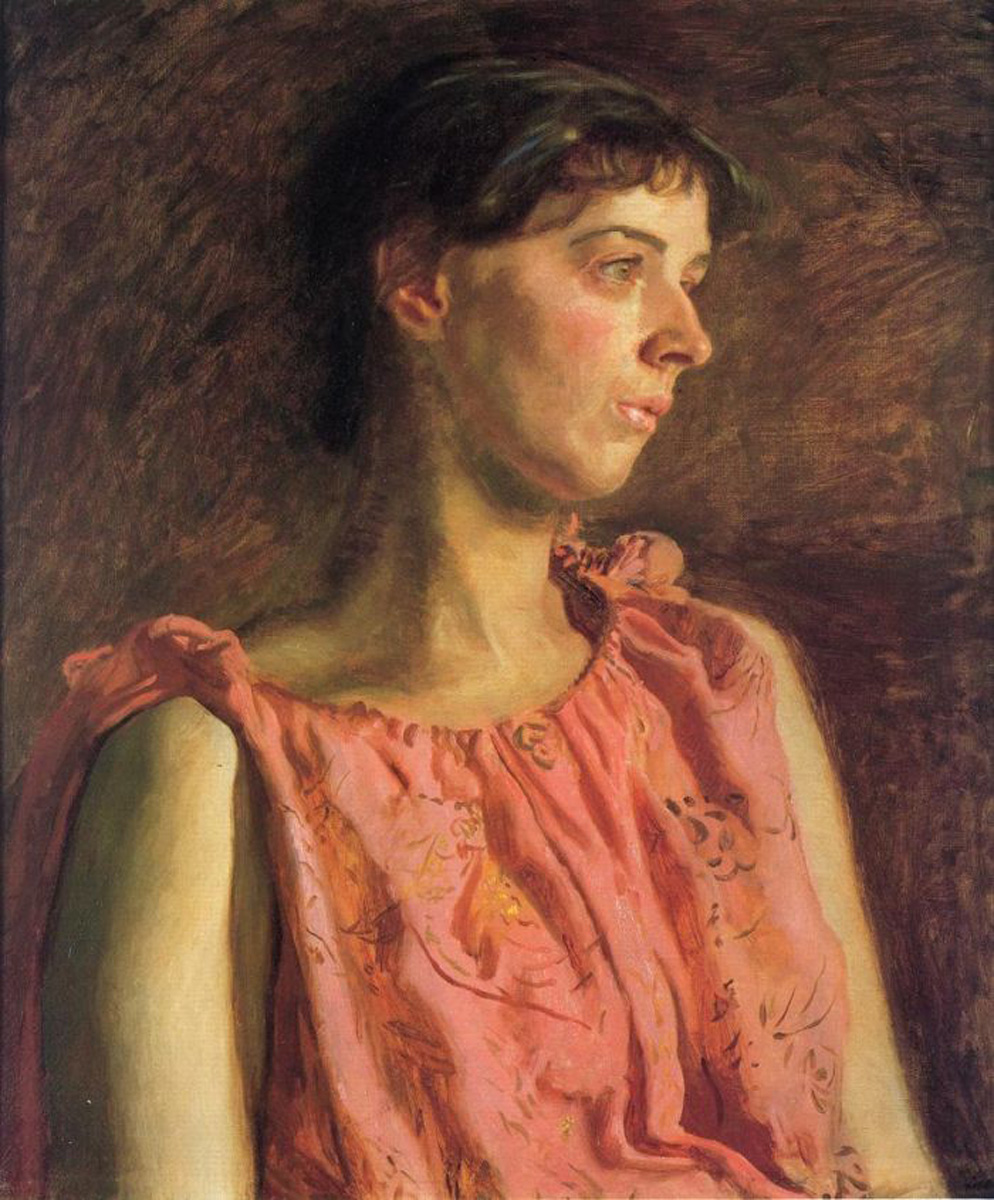
Eakins' portrait of Weda Cook following their reconciliation.

The painting was still unfinished when a rift developed between Eakins and Cook; one reason cited was his repeated request for her to pose nude, which Cook refused. Cook later described Eakins's "gentleness combined with the persistence of a devil", by which he persuaded her to disrobe "down to my underclothes" (possibly a reference to the "classical costume" seen in several photographs of Cook and her cousins made ca. 1892 in Eakins's studio). However, Cook later wrote that she had broken with Eakins over rumors that he had driven his niece, Ella Crowell, to insanity. Eakins finished the painting from Cook's shoes and dress, a circumstance that has been cited to account for a perceived awkwardness in the singer's stance and the placement of her right foot. Eakins and Cook had reconciled by 1895, when she, her husband, and her cousin Maud sat for individual portraits.

== Provenance ==
The Concert Singer remained in Eakins's possession until his death. It was exhibited several times during his lifetime, but he was unable to sell it. Eakins thought well of the picture, and priced it accordingly: in 1893 and 1895 he asked $1,000 for it, raising the price to $5,000 in 1914. In 1914 Weda Cook asked to purchase the painting, but Eakins replied that he could not part with it because "it must be largely exhibited yet", and because of its sentimental value to him: "I have many memories of it, some happy, some sad". After his death the painting was appraised for only $150. The painting was given to the Philadelphia Museum of Art in 1929 by Eakins's widow Susan Macdowell Eakins (1851–1938), and Miss Mary Adeline Williams, the latter a close friend who lived with Eakins and his wife for long periods.

== See also ==
- List of works by Thomas Eakins

== Sources ==
- Adams, Henry. Eakins Revealed: The Secret Life of an American Artist. New York: Oxford University Press, 2005. ISBN 0-19-515668-4
- Bohan, Ruth. Looking Into Walt Whitman: American Art, 1850–1920. Penn State Press, 2006. ISBN 0-271-02702-9
- Goodrich, Lloyd: Thomas Eakins. Harvard University Press, 1982. ISBN 0-674-88490-6
- Homer, William Innes. Thomas Eakins: His Life and Art. Abbeville, 1992. ISBN 1-55859-281-4
- Johns, Elizabeth. Thomas Eakins: The Heroism of Modern Life. Princeton University Press, 1983. ISBN 0-691-04022-2
- Kirkpatrick, Sidney. The Revenge of Thomas Eakins. Yale University Press, 2006. ISBN 0-300-10855-9, ISBN 978-0-300-10855-2
- Sewell, Darrel. Thomas Eakins: Artist of Philadelphia. Philadelphia Museum of Art, 1982. ISBN 0-87633-047-2
- Sewell, Darrel; et al. Thomas Eakins. Yale University Press, 2001. ISBN 0-87633-143-6
- Wilmerding, John. Thomas Eakins. Washington, DC: Smithsonian Institution Press, 1993. ISBN 1-56098-313-2
