= Lloyd Goodrich =

American art historian

Lloyd Goodrich (July 10, 1897 – March 27, 1987) was an American art historian. He wrote extensively on American artists, including Edward Hopper, Thomas Eakins, Winslow Homer, Raphael Soyer and Reginald Marsh. He was associated with the Whitney Museum of American Art in New York City for many years.

== Life and career ==
During his childhood in Nutley, New Jersey, Goodrich was a close friend of Reginald Marsh, who would later become an important painter.

Initially Goodrich considered a career as an artist. He studied painting and drawing at the Art Students League of New York with Kenneth Hayes Miller from 1913 to 1915. Between late 1915 and summer 1916, he studied with Douglas Volk at the National Academy of Design. In 1916 Goodrich returned to the Art Students League but he gave up his artistic ambitions by 1918.

In 1935 the Whitney Museum of American Art named him Research Curator. He later become the associate director in 1948, and then Director in 1958.

Goodrich died of cancer at the age of 89.

== Books ==
- Thomas Eakins: His life and work (1933, Whitney Museum of American Art)
- The Problem of Authenticity in American Art (1942, Whitney Museum of American Art)
- Winslow Homer (1944, Macmillan and Company)
- Yasuo Kuniyoshi (1948, Whitney Museum of American Art)
- Max Weber (1949, The Macmillan Company)
- Four American Expressionists (Exhibition catalogue, 1959, Whitney Museum of American Art)
- Edwin Dickinson (1965, Whitney Museum of American Art)
- Sao Paulo 9: Edward Hopper / Environment U.S.A.: 1957–1967 (1967, Washington DC: Smithsonian)
- The Graphic Art of Winslow Homer (1968, Museum of Graphic Art)
- Winslow Homer's America 1857–1880 (1969, Tudor Publishing Company)
- American naive paintings of the 18th & 19th centuries (1970, Chrysler Museum) – co-written with Albert Ten Eyck Gardner
- Edward Hopper (1971, Harry N. Abrams)
- Reginald Marsh (1972, Harry N. Abrams)
- Raphael Soyer (1972, Harry N. Abrams)
- Thomas Eakins (1982, Harvard University Press)
- Albert Pinkham Ryder: Painter of dreams (1989, Harry N. Abrams) – co-written with William Innes Homer
- Record of works by Winslow Homer (2005, Spanierman Gallery)
