= Taking the Count =

Painting by Thomas Eakins

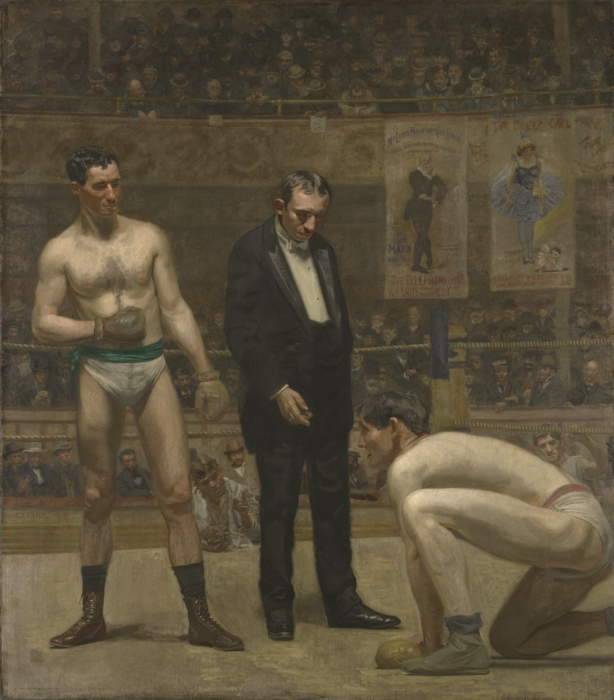
- Artist: Thomas Eakins
- Year: 1898
- Medium: oil on canvas
- Dimensions: 264.2 cm × 235 cm (104.0 in × 93 in)
- Location: Yale University Art Gallery, New Haven

Taking the Count is an 1898 painting by American artist Thomas Eakins. It is part of the collection of the Yale University Art Gallery, in New Haven.

This depiction of a prizefight marks Eakins' return to anatomical studies of the male figure, this time in a more urban setting. Taking the Count was his second largest canvas, but not his most successful composition. The same may be said of his Wrestlers (1899). More successful was Between Rounds (1899), for which boxer Billy Smith posed seated in his corner at Philadelphia's Arena; in fact, all of principal figures in this composition were posed by models re-enacting what had been an actual boxing match.

== See also ==
- List of works by Thomas Eakins
- 1898 in art
