= List of works by Thomas Eakins =

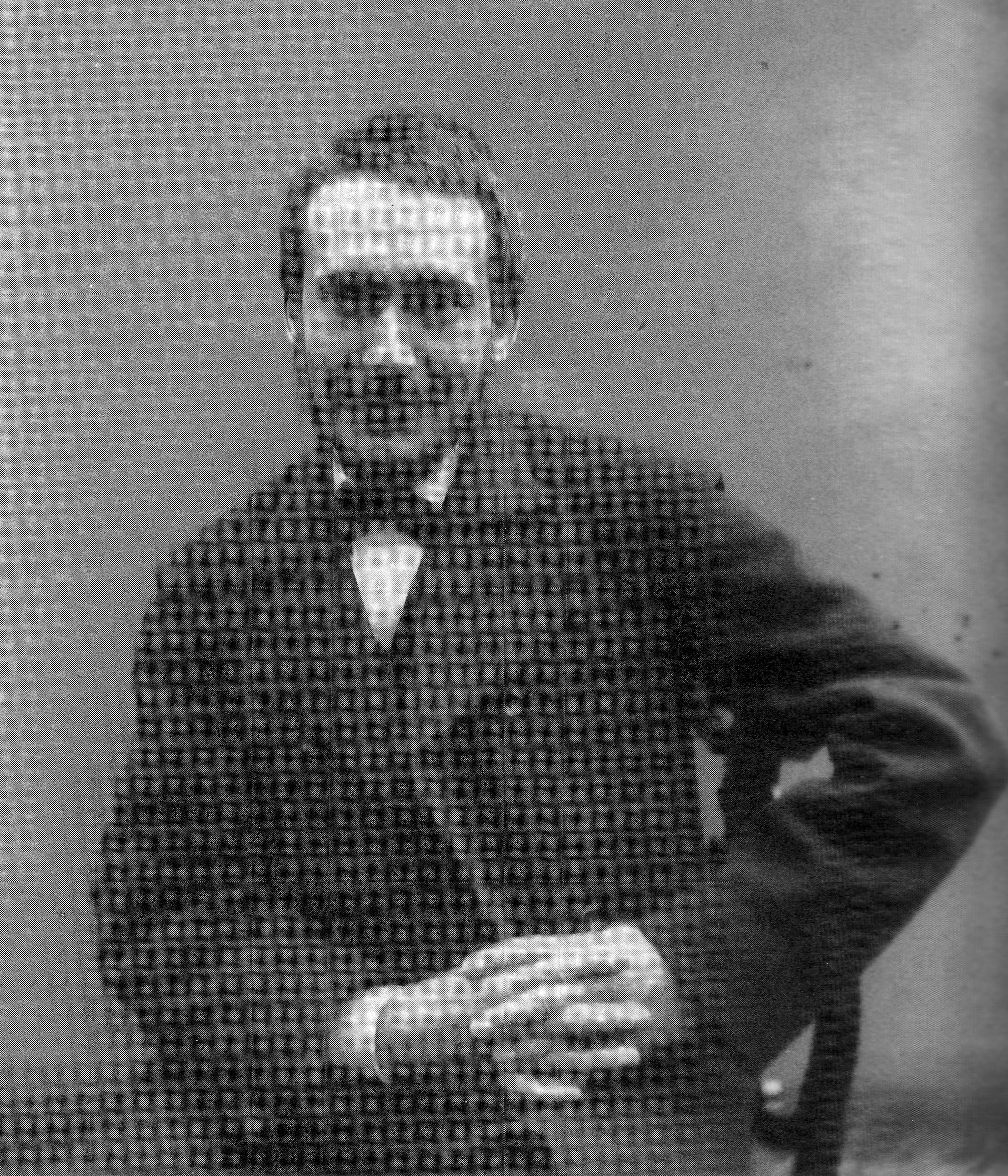
Photograph of Thomas Eakins c. 1882

This is a list of professionally authenticated paintings, drawings, and sculptures by Thomas Eakins (1844–1916). As there is no catalogue raisonné of Eakins' works, this is an aggregation of existing published catalogs.

== Background ==
During his lifetime, Thomas Eakins sold few paintings. On his death, ownership of his unsold works passed to his widow, Susan Macdowell Eakins, who kept them in their Philadelphia home. She dedicated the remaining years of her life to burnishing his legacy. In this, she was quite successful; in the period between Thomas Eakins' death and her own, she donated many of the strongest remaining pictures to museums around the world. The Philadelphia Museum of Art benefited particularly from these donations.

After Susan Macdowell Eakins' death in 1938, her executors emptied the house of anything which could be sold at auction. When former Eakins student Charles Bregler arrived at the house after it had been stripped he was horrified at what he found, describing it as the "most tragic and pitiful sight I ever saw. Every room was cluttered with debris as all the contents of the various drawers, closets etc were thrown upon the floor as they removed the furniture. All the life casts were smashed... I never want to see anything like this again." The number of works lost or destroyed at this time will never be known.

Bregler carefully collected what was left. Most of what remained were drawings and other preparatory studies. He was highly secretive about the contents of his collection and rarely allowed anyone to see it. After Bregler's death, ownership of the collection passed to his second wife, Mary Louise Picozzi Bregler, who was even more guarded as to its contents. In 1986, shortly before her death, Mary Bregler agreed to sell the works to the Pennsylvania Academy of the Fine Arts.

== Historiography ==
In the early 1930s, Susan Macdowell Eakins invited art historian Lloyd Goodrich into her home. Goodrich inventoried the collection in the house, interviewed Eakins' surviving associates, and studied Eakins' personal notes. In 1933, Goodrich published Thomas Eakins: His Life and Works. Though it was incomplete, un-illustrated, and did not include Eakins' photographs, Goodrich's book was the first definitive study of Eakins and the first attempt to catalog his artistic output.

In the 1970s, Gordon Hendricks published two Eakins catalogs. The Photographs of Thomas Eakins (1972; ISBN 0-670-55261-5) is a fully illustrated catalog of photographs by Thomas Eakins and his associates. Because Eakins did not keep detailed records of his photographs, nor did he sign, title, or date them, many of the dates and photographers listed in the catalog are educated guesses on Hendricks' part. It is difficult to know who took a particular photograph because Eakins often had his students use it. Hence, the attribution on many of these photographs is "Circle of Eakins" to indicate that a photograph was taken either by Eakins or one of his associates. The Life and Work of Thomas Eakins (1974; ISBN 0-670-42795-0) included a checklist of Eakins' works, a number of which had not been included in the 1933 Goodrich catalog.

In the 1980s, Lloyd Goodrich returned to the subject of Thomas Eakins. He began writing a three-volume book, Thomas Eakins. The first two volumes, published in 1982, were biographic in nature. Goodrich was unable to complete the third volume, a Thomas Eakins catalogue raisonné, before he died in 1987. He donated his papers to the Philadelphia Museum of Art, in the hopes that the curators there would finish the catalogue raisonné. This has not happened.

Until 1986, the Charles Bregler collection was effectively unknown to art historians. A few of the works in the Bregler collection were included in the 1933 Goodrich catalog, but after that they effectively disappeared from the scholarly community. A proper inventory became possible only after their 1986 sale to the Pennsylvania Academy of Fine Arts. In 1997, art historian Kathleen Foster published a definitive catalog of the Bregler collection, Thomas Eakins Rediscovered. (ISBN 0-300-06174-9)

== List organization ==
Paintings, drawings, and sculptures are listed, where possible, by their Goodrich catalog number supplemented with modifications from Goodrich's notes for his never-completed Eakins catalogue raisonné. The Goodrich catalog can be subdivided into three parts:

- Juvenalia – Goodrich classified several early works by Thomas Eakins (works made prior to Eakins' arrival in Paris) as juvenalia, and prefaced with a "J". Though mentioned throughout the Eakins literature, the catalog itself was not published. However, the list is accessible in the Goodrich papers in the Philadelphia archives.
- 1933 catalog works – "G" followed by a number indicates it is from Goodrich's 1933 Eakins catalog.
- 1980s catalog works – "G" followed by a number and then a letter indicates a work that was not included in the 1933 Goodrich catalog, but was included in his two volume Thomas Eakins, or in notes for the third volume, the never-finished catalog.

Works in the Charles Bregler collection at the Pennsylvania Academy of the Fine Arts are listed according to their number in Thomas Eakins Rediscovered.

== Goodrich catalogue of Eakins' paintings and sculptures ==
Title	Catalog #	Image	Format	Year	Dimensions (inches)	Collection	Notes
Map of Switzerland	J1		Pen, ink, and watercolor on paper	c. 1856–1857		Hirshhorn Museum and Sculpture Garden, Washington, D.C.	
Map of France, Spain, Portugal, and Italy	J2		Pen, ink, and watercolor on paper	c. 1856–1857	16 × 20	Collection of Mr. and Mrs. Francis Walters	
Spanish Scene: Peasant Crossing a Stream	J3		Pencil and chalk on paper	March 1858	10 1/16 × 14 7/16	Hirshhorn Museum and Sculpture Garden, Washington, D.C.	
Spanish Scene: Peasants and Travellers Among Ruins	J4		Pencil and ink on paper	1858	11 1/2 × 16 15/16	Hirshhorn Museum and Sculpture Garden, Washington, D.C.	
Camel and Rider	J5		Pencil and ink on paper	1858		Collection of Mr. and Mrs. Daniel Dietrich II	
Perspective of a Lathe	J6		Pencil and ink on paper	1860	16 5/16 × 22	Hirshhorn Museum and Sculpture Garden, Washington, D.C.	
Drawing of Gears	J7		Pen, ink, and pencil on paper	c. 1860	11 7/16 × 16 7/8	Hirshhorn Museum and Sculpture Garden, Washington, D.C.	
Visiting Card with Landscape	J8			c. late 1850s		Hirshhorn Museum and Sculpture Garden, Washington, D.C.	
Machinery	J9			c. 1860			
The Icosahedron	J10			c. 1860		Pennsylvania Academy of the Fine Arts, Philadelphia, Pennsylvania	
"Freedom"	J11			c. 1860		Pennsylvania Academy of the Fine Arts, Philadelphia, Pennsylvania	A drawing after the Statue of Freedom by Thomas Crawford
Nude woman, seated, wearing a mask	1		Charcoal on paper	c. 1863–1866	24 1/4 × 18 5/8 inches	Philadelphia Museum of Art, Philadelphia, Pennsylvania	
Nude woman, back turned	2		Charcoal on paper			Philadelphia Museum of Art, Philadelphia, Pennsylvania	
Nude boy	3		Charcoal on paper			Philadelphia Museum of Art, Philadelphia, Pennsylvania	
Nude man, seated	4		Charcoal on paper			Philadelphia Museum of Art, Philadelphia, Pennsylvania	
Nude woman reclining, back turned	5		Charcoal on paper			Philadelphia Museum of Art, Philadelphia, Pennsylvania	
Nude woman, reclining, seen from the front	6		Charcoal on paper			Philadelphia Museum of Art, Philadelphia, Pennsylvania	
Head, bust and arm of a child	7		Charcoal on paper			Philadelphia Museum of Art, Philadelphia, Pennsylvania	
Arm resting on the back of a chair	8		Charcoal on paper			Philadelphia Museum of Art, Philadelphia, Pennsylvania	
Nude man with a beard, seated on the floor	9		Charcoal on paper	1869		Philadelphia Museum of Art, Philadelphia, Pennsylvania	On the reverse is the middle section of a nude man.
Nude man standing	10		Charcoal on paper				
Legs of a seated model	11		Charcoal on paper			Newark Museum, Newark, New Jersey	
Legs of a standing model	12		Charcoal on paper				
Head and bust of an Arab man with a turban	13		Charcoal on paper	1866–1867		Fine Arts Museums of San Francisco, San Francisco	
Torso and arm of a nude man	14		Charcoal on paper				
Nude woman reclining on a couch	15		Charcoal on paper	1863–1866		Fogg Art Museum, Cambridge, Massachusetts	
Nude woman reclining, wearing a mask	16		Charcoal on paper				
Nude woman standing	17		Charcoal on paper	1876			
Nude man seated	18		Charcoal on paper	c. 1869			Double sided with "Head of a Warrior". Auctioned at Christie's NY, December 8, 2008; sold for $50,000
Illustrated letter to his Mother, Nov. 8–9, 1866	18A					Hirshhorn Museum and Sculpture Garden, Washington, D.C.	
Antique study, female head	19		Oil on heavy paper	c. 1867–1869			Lost
Antique study, male roman head	20		Oil on canvas	c. 1867–1869			Lost
Study of a leg	21		Oil on heavy paper	c. 1867–1869		Joslyn Art Museum, Omaha, Nebraska	
Study of a ram's head	22		Oil on canvas	c. 1867–1869			Lost
Study of a girl's head	23		Oil on canvas	c. 1868–1869			Private collection
Study of a girl's head	24		Oil on canvas	c. 1867–1874		Hirshhorn Museum and Sculpture Garden, Washington, D.C.	
Study of a girl's head	25		Oil on canvas	c. 1867–1869		Philadelphia Museum of Art, Philadelphia, Pennsylvania	
The Strong Man	26		Oil on canvas	c. 1867–1869		Philadelphia Museum of Art, Philadelphia, Pennsylvania	Study
Bust of a Man (Study of a Nude Man)	27		Oil on canvas	c. 1867–1869		Philadelphia Museum of Art, Philadelphia, Pennsylvania	
Study of a student's head	28		Oil on canvas mounted on cardboard	c. 1867–1878			Thought to have been lost. Auctioned at Sotheby's NY, May 2001; sold for $46,750.
Study of a student's head	29		Oil on canvas mounted on cardboard	c. 1867–1879		Collection of William E. Stokes	
Female Model (formerly called A Negress)	30		Oil on canvas			M. H. de Young Memorial Museum, San Francisco, California	
Scene in a Cathedral	31		Oil on canvas				Deaccessioned from the Hirshhorn Museum and Sculpture Garden. Auctioned at Christie's NY, December 1, 2010; sold for $18,750.
Carmelita Requena	32		Oil on canvas	1869		Metropolitan Museum of Art, New York City, New York	
A Street Scene in Seville	33		Oil on canvas	1870		Collection of Erving and Joyce Wolf	
A Spanish Woman (Also known as "Dolores")	34		Oil on canvas				
Francis Eakins	35		Oil on canvas	Late 1870/Early 1871		Nelson-Atkins Museum of Art, Kansas City, Missouri	
At the Piano	36		Oil on canvas	Late 1870/Early 1871		Blanton Museum of Art, Austin, Texas	
Home Scene	37		Oil on canvas	Late 1870/Early 1871		Brooklyn Museum of Art, New York City	
Benjamin Eakins	38		Watercolor on paper	c. 1870		Private collection	
Margaret in Skating Costume	39		Oil on canvas	1871		Philadelphia Museum of Art, Philadelphia, Pennsylvania	
Margaret (study)	40		Oil on canvas	c. 1871			Deaccessioned from Hirshhorn Museum and Sculpture Garden. Auctioned at Sotheby's NY, May 19, 2010, Lot 109.
Margaret (sketch)	41		Oil on canvas	c. 1871		Mitchell Museum at Cedarhurst, Mount Vernon, Illinois	
Hiawatha	42		Watercolor on paper				No longer exists.
Hiawatha	43		Oil on canvas			Hirshhorn Museum and Sculpture Garden, Washington, D.C.	Study for Hiawatha watercolor. Described erroneously as unfinished.
Max Schmitt in a Single Scull	44		Oil on canvas	1871		Metropolitan Museum of Art, New York	
Drawing of the Girard Avenue Bridge	44A		Drawing			Hirshhorn Museum and Sculpture Garden, Washington, D.C.	Double sided: reverse side depicts the sketch for an oar.
Portrait of M.H. Messchert	44B		Painting				
Kathrin (Girl with a cat)	45		Oil on canvas	1872		Yale University Art Gallery, New Haven, Connecticut	
Study for Kathrin	45A		Drawing				
Elizabeth Crowell and her Dog	46		Oil on canvas	Early 1870s		San Diego Museum of Art, San Diego, California	
Mrs. James W. Crowell	47		Oil on canvas	Early 1870s			
Grouse	48		Oil on canvas	1872		Mint Museum of Art, Charlotte, North Carolina	
The Pair-Oared Shell	49		Oil on canvas	1872		Philadelphia Museum of Art, Philadelphia, Pennsylvania	
Perspective Drawing for The Pair-Oared Shell	50		Pencil and ink on paper mounted on cardboard			Philadelphia Museum of Art, Philadelphia, Pennsylvania	
Perspective Drawing for The Pair-Oared Shell	51		Pencil, ink, and watercolor on paper mounted on cardboard	1872		Philadelphia Museum of Art, Philadelphia, Pennsylvania	
The Biglin Brothers Turning the Stake	52		Oil on canvas	1873		Cleveland Museum of Art, Cleveland, Ohio	
Perspective Drawing for the Biglin Brothers Turning the Stake	52A		Drawing			Cleveland Museum of Art, Cleveland, Ohio	
Perspective Drawing for the Biglin Brothers Turning the Stake	53		Pencil and ink on paper mounted on cardboard	1873		Hirshhorn Museum and Sculpture Garden, Washington, D.C.	
The Pair-Oared Race – John and Barney Biglin Turning the Stake	54		Watercolor	1874			Lost
A Rower	55		Watercolor				Given to Jean-Léon Gérôme by Thomas Eakins. "Present location unknown"
John Biglin (also known as "The Sculler")	56		Watercolor	1874	16 7/8 × 23 15/16	Yale University Art Gallery, New Haven, Connecticut	
John Biglin in a Single Scull	57		Watercolor on paper	1873 or early 1874	19 5/16 × 24 7/8	Metropolitan Museum of Art, New York	
Perspective Drawing for John Biglin in a Single Scull	58		Pencil and ink on paper mounted on cardboard	c. 1874	27 3/8 × 45 1/4	Museum of Fine Arts, Boston, Boston, Massachusetts	
John Biglin in a Single Scull	59		Oil on canvas	1873–1874	24 3/8 × 16	Yale University Art Gallery, New Haven, Connecticut	
John Biglin in a Single Scull	60		Watercolor	1873–1874			Given to Jean-Léon Gérôme by Thomas Eakins.
The Biglin Brothers Racing	61		Oil on canvas	Probably 1873		National Gallery of Art, Washington, D.C.	
Perspective Drawing for the Biglin Brothers Racing	62		Pencil and ink on paper mounted on cardboard			Hirshhorn Museum and Sculpture Garden, Washington, D.C.	
Oarsmen on the Schuylkill	63		Oil on canvas	c. 1873		Private Collection.	Deaccessioned from Brooklyn Museum of Art.
Oarsman in a Single Scull (also known as "Sketch of Max Schmitt in a Single Scull")	64		Oil on canvas			Philadelphia Museum of Art, Philadelphia, Pennsylvania	
Oarsmen	65		Oil on canvas	Probably c. 1873		Portland Art Museum, Portland, Oregon	
The Schreiber Brothers	66		Oil on canvas	1874		Yale University Art Gallery, New Haven, Connecticut	
Perspective Drawing	67		Pencil and ink on paper mounted on cardboard			Pennsylvania Academy of the Fine Arts, Philadelphia, Pennsylvania	
The Artist and His Father Hunting Reed Birds	68		Oil on canvas	c. 1874		Virginia Museum of Fine Arts, Richmond, Virginia	
Perspective Drawing for the Artist and His Father Hunting Reed Birds	69		Pencil and ink on paper mounted on cardboard				
Pushing for the Rail	70		Oil on canvas	1874		Metropolitan Museum of Art, New York	
Whistling for Plover	71		Watercolor on paper	1874		Brooklyn Museum of Art, New York	
Whistling for Plover	72		Oil				
Sketch for Hunting	73		Oil on canvas mounted on cardboard	c. 1874		Collection of Jamie Wyeth	
Studies of Game-Birds (Also known as "Plover")	74		Oil on canvas mounted on cardboard			Virginia Museum of Fine Arts, Richmond, Virginia	
Landscape with a Dog	75		Oil on canvas			Philadelphia Museum of Art, Philadelphia, Pennsylvania	
Sailboats Racing on the Delaware	76		Oil on canvas	1874		Philadelphia Museum of Art, Philadelphia, Pennsylvania	
Sailing	77		Oil on canvas	c. 1874		Philadelphia Museum of Art, Philadelphia, Pennsylvania	
Starting Out After Rail	78		Oil on canvas	1874		Museum of Fine Arts, Boston, Boston, Massachusetts	
Starting Out After Rail	79		Watercolor	1874		Wichita Art Museum, Wichita, Kansas	
Ships and Sailboats on the Delaware (also known as "Becalmed")	80		Oil on canvas	1874		Wadsworth Atheneum, Hartford, Connecticut	
Study for Ships and Sailboats on the Delaware	81		Oil on canvas mounted on cardboard			Pennsylvania Academy of the Fine Arts, Philadelphia, Pennsylvania	
Ships and Sailboats on the Delaware	82		Oil on canvas	1874		Philadelphia Museum of Art, Philadelphia, Pennsylvania	
Drifting	83		Watercolor	c. 1874		National Gallery of Art, Washington, D.C.	
Mrs. Benjamin Eakins	84		Oil on canvas	c. 1874		Collection of Mr. and Mrs. Daniel Dietrich II	
Portrait of Professor Benjamin H. Rand	85		Oil on canvas	1874		Crystal Bridges Museum of American Art, Bentonville, Arkansas	Deaccessioned from Thomas Jefferson University, Philadelphia, Pennsylvania, April 2007 (after 130 years in the collection).
Baseball Players Practicing	86		Watercolor on paper	1875		Rhode Island School of Design Museum, Providence, Rhode Island	
Perspective drawing for Baseball Players practicing	86A		Drawing			Hirshhorn Museum and Sculpture Garden, Washington, D.C.	
Elizabeth at the Piano	87		Oil on canvas	1875		Addison Gallery of American Art, Andover, Massachusetts	
The Gross Clinic	88		Oil on canvas	1875		Philadelphia Museum of Art and the Pennsylvania Academy of the Fine Arts, Philadelphia, Pennsylvania	
Sketch for the Gross Clinic	89		Oil on canvas	1875		Philadelphia Museum of Art, Philadelphia, Pennsylvania	
Dr. Gross (Study for "The Gross Clinic)	90		Oil on canvas	1875		Worcester Art Museum, Worcester, Massachusetts	
Black and White version	91		India ink on cardboard	1875		Metropolitan Museum of Art, New York	Drawn after the painting, to be photographed and reproduced as a collotype.
Drawing of Two Heads	92		"India ink on paper, with pen and brush"	1876		Philadelphia Museum of Art, Philadelphia, Pennsylvania	
Robert C.V. Meyers	93		Oil on brown paper	1875		Collection of Mr. and Mrs. Daniel Dietrich II	
The Zither Player	94		Watercolor on paper	1876		Art Institute of Chicago, Chicago, Illinois	
J. Harry Lewis	95		Oil on canvas	1876		Philadelphia Museum of Art, Philadelphia, Pennsylvania	
The Chess Players	96		Wood	1876		Metropolitan Museum of Art, New York	
Perspective Drawing for the Chess Players	97		Pencil and ink on paper	1875–1876		Metropolitan Museum of Art, New York	
M. Gardel	98		Oil on paper mounted on cardboard			Philadelphia Museum of Art, Philadelphia, Pennsylvania	
Baby at Play	99		Oil on canvas	1876		National Gallery of Art, Washington, DC.	
Studies of a Baby	100		Oil on canvas			Duke-Semans Fine Arts Foundation (in the care of the Nasher Museum of Art, Durham, North Carolina)	Double sided.
Dr. John H. Brinton	101		Oil on canvas	1876		The National Museum of Health and Medicine of the Armed Forces Institute of Pathology, Washington, D.C. On long-term loan to the National Gallery of Art	Dr. Brinton was a close friend of Eakins's, and succeeded Dr. Samuel D. Gross as chair of surgery at Jefferson Medical College. (See G-126 for Eakins's portrait of Mrs. Brinton.)
Mrs. Samuel Hall Williams (Portrait of Abbie Williams)	102		Wood	c. 1876			Deaccessioned from the Art Institute of Chicago. Auctioned at Christie's NY, September 27, 2011; sold for $134,500.
Columbus in Prison	103		Oil on canvas	c. 1876		Kennedy Galleries, New York	
Sketch for the Surrender of General Lee to General Grant at Appomattox	103A		Oil on canvas				Deaccessioned from the Hirshhorn Museum and Sculpture Garden. Auctioned at Christie's NY, September 27, 2011; sold for $32,500.
Sketch for the Surrender of General Lee to General Grant at Appomattox	103B		Oil on canvas			Museum of Fine Arts, Boston, Boston, Massachusetts	
Will Schuster and Blackman Going Shooting	104		Oil on canvas	1876		Yale University Art Gallery, New Haven, Connecticut	
Perspective Drawing for Will Schuster and Blackman Going Shooting	104A		Drawing			Collection of Mr. and Mrs. Daniel Dietrich II	
Rail Shooting	105		Oil on canvas				"Present whereabouts or existence unknown"
In Grandmother's Time	106		Oil on canvas	1876		Smith College Museum of Art, Northampton, Massachusetts	
In Grandmother's Time	106A		Oil on wood				Originally double sided with G-106B until the two images were split
Landscape	106B		Oil on wood				Originally double sided with G-106A until the two images were split Deassessioned from Hirshhorn Museum and Sculpture Garden. Auctioned at Christie's NY, March 23, 2016, Lot 57.
Archbishop James Frederick Wood	107		Oil on canvas	1877		Crystal Bridges Museum of American Art, Bentonville, Arkansas	Deaccessioned from St. Charles Borromeo Seminary, Wynnewood, Pennsylvania, 2015.
Study for the portrait of James Frederick Wood	108		Oil on canvas	1876		Yale University Art Gallery, New Haven, Connecticut	
Scenes in a Cathedral	108A, 108B, 108C, 108D, 108E, 108F, 108G, 108H, 108I		Drawings			Hirshhorn Museum and Sculpture Garden, Washington, D.C.	
William Rush and His Model	109		Oil on canvas	1876–1877		Philadelphia Museum of Art, Philadelphia, Pennsylvania	
Studies for "William Rush"	109A, 109B, 109C, 109D, 109E, 109F, 109G, 109H,		Drawings			Hirshhorn Museum and Sculpture Garden, Washington, D.C.	
Study for William Rush and His Model (Yale), G-111	110		Oil on cardboard,	c. 1877	8 1/4 × 10 1/2	Farnsworth Art Museum, Rockland, Maine	
William Rush and His Model (Yale)	111		Oil on canvas	1876		Yale University Art Gallery, New Haven, Connecticut	
Interior of Rush's Shop	112		Oil on canvas	1876–1877		Philadelphia Museum of Art, Philadelphia, Pennsylvania	
The Model (Nude: Study) Study for William Rush and His Model (Yale), G-111	113		Oil on canvas	1876		Art Institute of Chicago, Chicago, Illinois	
Seventy Years Ago	114		Watercolor on paper	1877		Princeton University Art Museum, Princeton, New Jersey	
Sketch for Seventy Years Ago	115		Oil on canvas			Seattle Art Museum, Seattle, Washington	
Young Girl Meditating	116		Watercolor on paper	1877		Metropolitan Museum of Art, New York	
Sketch for Young Girl Meditating	117		Oil on canvas			Pennsylvania Academy of the Fine Arts, Philadelphia, Pennsylvania	
Study for Young Girl Meditating	117A		Oil on canvas	1877		Collection of Martin Perez.	
In Washington (Lafayette Park, Washington, D.C.)	118		Wood	1877		Philadelphia Museum of Art, Philadelphia, Pennsylvania	Painted from a window of the White House, as Eakins waited for President Rutherford B. Hayes to sit for a portrait.
The Courtship	119		Oil on canvas	c. 1878		M. H. de Young Memorial Museum, San Francisco, California	
Study for The Courtship	120		Oil on canvas	1877-1878	14 × 17		Auctioned at Christie's NY, June 3, 1983; sold for $80,000. Ex collection: Gulf States Paper Corporation, Tuscaloosa, Alabama (1983-2013). Auctioned at Christie's New York, September 25, 2013; sold for $32,500.
The Spinner (sketch for The Courtship)	121		Oil on canvas	c. 1878		Worcester Art Museum, Worcester, Massachusetts	
The Spinner (sketch for The Courtship)	122		Wood			Private collection.	The reverse side has a sketch of Dr. Andrews.
The Young Man (sketch for The Courtship)	123		Oil on canvas				
Anna Williams	123A						
Study for Anna Williams	123B						
Negro Boy Dancing (also known as "The Dancing Lesson")	124		Watercolor on paper	1878		Metropolitan Museum of Art, New York	
Drawing for the Negro Boy dancing	124A		Drawing	1878		Pennsylvania Academy of the Fine Arts, Philadelphia, Pennsylvania	
Study for Negro Boy Dancing	125		Oil on canvas			National Gallery of Art, Washington, D.C.	
Study for Negro Boy Dancing	125A					National Gallery of Art, Washington, D.C.	
Mrs. John H. Brinton	126		Oil on canvas	1878		Collection of Mrs. Rodolphe Meyer de Schauensee	Depicts Sarah (Ward) Brinton, wife of John H. Brinton (See G-101).
The Spelling Bee at Angel's	127			1878			Published in Scribner's Magazine, November 1878
Thar's a New Game Down in Frisco	127A		Oil on canvas			Pennsylvania Academy of the Fine Arts, Philadelphia, Pennsylvania	Study for the central standing figure in the Spelling Bee at Angel's.
The Spelling Bee at Angel's	128			1878			Published in Scribner's Magazine, November 1878
Mr. Neelus Peeler's Conditions	129		Black ink and Chinese white on paper	1879		Brooklyn Museum of Art, New York	Published in Scribner's Magazine, June 1879
Perspective drawing for Mr. Neelus Peeler's Conditions	129A		Drawing			Hirshhorn Museum and Sculpture Garden, Washington, D.C.	
Sketch for Mr. Neelus Peeler's Conditions	130		Wood			New Britain Museum of American Art, New Britain, Connecticut	Double sided. Often incorrectly referred to as "The Timer"
Four anatomical drawings	130A, 130B, 130C, 130D		Drawings			Hirshhorn Museum and Sculpture Garden, Washington, D.C.	
A Quiet Moment	131		Oil on canvas	1879			Lost
Sewing	132		Oil on wood	c. 1879		New Britain Museum of American Art, New Britain, Connecticut	Reverse side contains the sketch of an interior.
Study of a Woman Knitting	132A		Oil			Hirshhorn Museum and Sculpture Garden, Washington, D.C.	
The Fairman Rogers Four-in-Hand	133		Oil on canvas	1879–1880		Philadelphia Museum of Art, Philadelphia, Pennsylvania	
Sketches for the Fairman Rogers Four-in-Hand	134		Oil on wood	1879		Philadelphia Museum of Art, Philadelphia, Pennsylvania	Double sided: one side depicts the coach being driven across the picture; the other side is a study of Mrs. Rogers.
Landscape sketch for the Fairman Rogers Four-in-Hand	135	Reverse of G135 as it appeared in 1933.	Oil on wood				Originally composed of five or six sketches, which were later split.
Study of the Delaware River	135A		Oil				Originally part of G-135 until they were split.
Study of a Man's Head for Mending the Net	135B		Oil			Private Collection.	Originally part of G-135 until they were split. Auctioned at Christie's NY, May 19, 2005, Lot 1520; sold for $38,400.
Study of a Woman's Head for Mending the Net	135C		Oil				Originally part of G-135 until they were split.
Landscape sketch for the Fairman Rogers Four-in-Hand	136		Oil on wood			Philadelphia Museum of Art, Philadelphia, Pennsylvania	Double sided: one side is a study in Fairmount park. The other is a color note.
Study of Horse for The Fairman Rogers Four-in-Hand	137		Oil on wood	1879			Originally double sided with 137A until the two images were split Deaccessioned from Hirshhorn Museum and Sculpture Garden. Auctioned at Sotheby's NY (in a lot with G-137A, G-199A & G-201A), May 21, 2009; the lot sold for $119,500.
Study of Horses for The Fairman Rogers Four-in-Hand	137A		Oil on canvas	1879			Originally double sided with 137 until the two images were split Deaccessioned from Hirshhorn Museum and Sculpture Garden. Auctioned at Sotheby's NY (in a lot with G-137, G-199A & G-201A), May 21, 2009; the lot sold for $119,500.
Fan	137B						Sold at auction, January 24, 1994, for $160,000.
General George Cadwalader	138		Oil on canvas	1880		Butler Institute of American Art, Youngstown, Ohio	
General George Cadwalader	139		Oil on canvas	1880			Painted posthumously from a carte-de-visite. Deassessioned from the collection of the Mutual Assurance Company of Philadelphia. Offered for auction at Sotheby's New York, November 13, 2017. Unsold.
Retrospection	140		Oil on wood	1880		Yale University Art Gallery, New Haven, Connecticut	
Retrospection (Watercolor)	141		Watercolor on paper			Philadelphia Museum of Art, Philadelphia, Pennsylvania	
Walter MacDowell	141A		Oil			Private collection	
The Crucifixion	142		Oil on canvas	1880		Philadelphia Museum of Art, Philadelphia, Pennsylvania	
Sketch for the Crucifixion	143		Oil on canvas	1880		Hirshhorn Museum and Sculpture Garden, Washington, D.C.	
J. Laurie Wallace posing	143A		Oil			Private collection	Auctioned at Sotheby's NY, December 3, 1987; sold for $160,000.
Spinning	144		Watercolor on paper	1881		Collection of Mrs. John Randolph Garrett Sr.	
Drawing for Spinning	144A		Drawing				
Sketch for Spinning	145		Oil on wood			Pennsylvania Academy of the Fine Arts, Philadelphia, Pennsylvania	
Spinning (also called "Homespun")	146		Watercolor on paper	1881		Metropolitan Museum of Art, New York	
Sketch for Spinning	147		Oil on wood			Yale University Art Gallery, New Haven, Connecticut	Double sided – the reverse side also contains a sketch for Spinning
The Pathetic Song	148		Oil on canvas	1881		Corcoran Museum of Art, Washington, DC.	
Sketch for the Pathetic Song	149		Oil on wood	1881		Hirshhorn Museum and Sculpture Garden, Washington, DC.	
The Pathetic Song	149A		Watercolor			Metropolitan Museum of Art, New York	
Rail Shooting	150		Drawing	1881		Yale University Art Gallery, New Haven, Connecticut	Published in Scribner's Magazine, July 1881
A Pusher (also known as "Poleman in the Ma'sh)	151		Drawing	1881	11 × 5 7/8	National Gallery of Art, Washington, D.C.	
Drawing for William Rush Carving The Allegorical Figure Of The Schuylkill	151A		Drawing			Hirshhorn Museum and Sculpture Garden, Washington, D.C.	
Shad-Fishing at Gloucester on the Delaware River (also called "Taking up the Net")	152		Oil on canvas	1881		Philadelphia Museum of Art, Philadelphia, Pennsylvania	
Shad-Fishing at Gloucester on the Delaware River (also called "Taking up the Net")	153		Watercolor on paper	1881		Metropolitan Museum of Art, New York	
Shad-Fishing at Gloucester on the Delaware River	154		Oil	1881		Ball State University Art Museum, Muncie, Indiana	
Mending the Net	155		Oil on canvas	1881		Philadelphia Museum of Art, Philadelphia, Pennsylvania	
Drawing for Mending the Net	155A		Drawing				
A Fisherman	156		Oil on cardboard			Pennsylvania Academy of the Fine Arts, Philadelphia, Pennsylvania	
The Tree	157		Oil on wood				Originally double sided with G-157A until the two images were split. Auctioned at Christie's New York, May 21, 2008, Lot 90; sold for $23,750.
Mending the Net: Study of the Tree	157A		Oil on wood				Originally double sided with G-157 until the two images were split.
Mending the Net	158		Watercolor on paper	1882			Auctioned at Christie's NY, June 5, 1997; sold for $1,400,000.
Drawing the Seine	159		Watercolor on paper	1882		Philadelphia Museum of Art, Philadelphia, Pennsylvania	
Hauling the Seine	160		Oil on canvas	1882		Princeton University Art Museum, Princeton, New Jersey	
"The Meadows, Gloucester, New Jersey"	161		Oil on canvas	c. 1882		Philadelphia Museum of Art, Philadelphia, Pennsylvania	
"Sketch for The Meadows, Gloucester, New Jersey"	162		Oil on wood				Originally double sided with G-162A until the two images were split.
Study	162A		Oil				Originally double sided with G-162 until the two images were split.
In the Country	163		Oil on canvas	c. 1882	10 1/4 × 14	Private collection	Auctioned at Sotheby's NY, November 29, 1990; sold for $30,000.
Near the Sea (Also known as "Landscape study")	164		Oil on canvas			Collection of Mr. and Mrs. Daniel Dietrich II	
Untitled landscape sketch	165		Oil on wood				Originally double sided with G-165A until the two images were split.
Study of a horse	165A		Oil				Originally double sided with G-165 until the two images were split.
Untitled landscape sketch	166		Oil on canvas			Philadelphia Museum of Art, Philadelphia, Pennsylvania	
Delaware River Scene	167		Oil on canvas			Pennsylvania Academy of the Fine Arts, Philadelphia, Pennsylvania	
Untitled landscape sketch	168		Oil on canvas				
Untitled landscape sketch	169		Oil on cardboard			Philadelphia Museum of Art, Philadelphia, Pennsylvania	
Untitled landscape sketch	170		Oil on paper			Pennsylvania Academy of the Fine Arts, Philadelphia, Pennsylvania	
Untitled landscape sketch	171		Oil on paper				
Untitled landscape sketch	172		Oil on canvas			Pennsylvania Academy of the Fine Arts, Philadelphia, Pennsylvania	
Untitled landscape sketch	173		Oil on canvas			Collection of Mr. and Mrs. Daniel Dietrich II	
Untitled landscape sketch	174		Oil on canvas			University at Buffalo, The State University of New York art gallery, Buffalo, New York	
Untitled landscape sketch	175		Oil on cardboard			Collection of Mr. and Mrs. Daniel Dietrich II	
Untitled landscape sketch	176		Oil on canvas				
Untitled landscape sketch	177		Oil on cardboard				
The Brinton House	177A		Oil	1878			Subject is the William Brinton 1704 House in Birmingham Township, Chester County, Pennsylvania. Painted for Eakins's friend Dr. John H. Brinton (See G-101).
Study for Old Man in Taking The Count	178		Oil on canvas	c. 1898	13 1/4 × 10		Auctioned at Christie's New York, May 24, 2007; sold for $78,000. Auctioned at Freeman's Philadelphia, December 6, 2015; sold for $46,875.
Untitled sketch	179		Oil on canvas mounted on cardboard				
Untitled sketch ("Girl in Shade")	180		Oil on cardboard			Joslyn Art Museum, Omaha, Nebraska	
Untitled sketch	181		Oil on wood				
Boatman (Study of a Groom)	182		Oil on wood	c. 1879		Philadelphia Museum of Art, Philadelphia, Pennsylvania	Double sided: one side is a study for the left leader horse in "The Fairman Rogers Four-In-Hand." The reverse side is the Study of a Groom.
Untitled sketch	183		Oil on cardboard			Collection of Mr. and Mrs. Daniel Dietrich II	
Untitled sketch	184		Oil on heavy paper mounted on cardboard			La Salle University Art Gallery, Philadelphia, Pennsylvania	
Study of Three Balls of Wool and a Rosebush	185		Oil on canvas			Joslyn Art Museum, Omaha, Nebraska	
Two Cylinders and a Ball	185A		Oil			Joslyn Art Museum, Omaha, Nebraska	
Untitled sketch	186		Oil on heavy paper				
Study of a woman seated	187		Oil on canvas mounted on cardboard				Auctioned at Doyle's NY, November 28, 2007; unsold.
Street Scene	187A		Oil			Hirshhorn Museum and Sculpture Garden, Washington, D.C.	
The Writing Master	188		oil on canvas	1882		Metropolitan Museum of Art, New York	
Sketch for the Writing Master	189		Oil on wood			Philadelphia Museum of Art, Philadelphia, Pennsylvania	Double sided – one side is a sketch for "The Writing Master." The other side is Sketch of a Man and Study of Drapery
The Swimming Hole	190		Oil on canvas	1884–1885		Amon Carter Museum, Fort Worth, Texas	
Study for the Swimming Hole	191		Oil on wood	1884		Hirshhorn Museum and Sculpture Garden, Washington, DC.	
Sketch of the landscape for the Swimming Hole	192		Oil on wood			Collection of Mr. I David Orr	
Sketches for the Swimming Hole	193		Oil on cardboard			Collection of Mr. and Mrs. Daniel Dietrich II	Double-sided, both sides are studies for "The Swimming Hole"
Sketches for the Swimming Hole	194		Oil on cardboard			Amon Carter Museum, Fort Worth, Texas	Double-sided, both sides are studies for "The Swimming Hole"
Study for The Swimming Hole	195		Oil on cardboard			Collection of Mr. and Mrs. Daniel Dietrich II	Double-sided, obverse side contains study of the fisherman's hand from "Mending the Net"
Arcadia	196		Oil on canvas	1883		Metropolitan Museum of Art, New York	
Sketch for Arcadia	197		Oil on wood			Pennsylvania Academy of the Fine Arts, Philadelphia, Pennsylvania	
Youth Playing Pipes	198		Oil on wood			Carnegie Museum of Art, Pittsburgh, Pennsylvania	J. Laurie Wallace posed as the model.
Boy Reclining	199		Oil on wood			Hirshhorn Museum and Sculpture Garden, Washington, DC.	Originally double sided with G-199A until the two images were split.
Study of a Horse	199A		Drawing				Originally double sided with G-199 until the two images were split. Deaccessioned from Hirshhorn Museum and Sculpture Garden. Auctioned at Sotheby's NY (in a lot with G-137, G-137A & G-201A), May 21, 2009; the lot sold for $119,500.
An Arcadian	200		Oil on canvas	c. 1883			
Study for An Arcadian	201		Oil on wood				Originally double sided with G-201A until the two images were split. Deassessioned from Hirshhorn Museum and Sculpture Garden. Auctioned at Christie's NY, March 23, 2016, Lot 56.
Studies of a horse	201A		Drawing				Originally double sided with G-201 until the two images were split. Deaccessioned from Hirshhorn Museum and Sculpture Garden. Auctioned at Sotheby's NY (in a lot with G-137, G-137A & G-199A), 2009; the lot sold for $119,500.
Weda Cook and Statue	201B		Oil				See G-267A for a related study.
A Woman's Back: Study	202		Oil on wood	1879		Collection of Mr. and Mrs. Daniel Dietrich II	
Female Nude	203		Oil on canvas	Probably early 1880s		Hirshhorn Museum and Sculpture Garden, Washington, D.C.	
Female Nude	204		Oil on canvas	Probably early 1880s		Nelson-Atkins Museum of Art, Kansas City, Missouri	
Female Nude	205		Watercolor on paper			Philadelphia Museum of Art, Philadelphia, Pennsylvania	
Study for female nude	205A		Oil				Deaccessioned from the Hirshhorn Museum and Sculpture Garden. Auctioned at Sotheby's NY, September 29, 2010; sold for $50,000.
J. Laurie Wallace	206		Oil on canvas	c. 1883		Joslyn Art Museum, Omaha, Nebraska	
Drawing for J. Laurie Wallace	206A		Drawing			Joslyn Art Museum, Omaha, Nebraska	
Professionals at Rehearsal	207		Oil on canvas	c. 1883		Philadelphia Museum of Art, Philadelphia, Pennsylvania	
Perspective Study Of Boy Viewing an Object	207A					Hirshhorn Museum and Sculpture Garden, Washington, D.C.	
Perspective drawing of a table	207B					Hirshhorn Museum and Sculpture Garden, Washington, D.C.	
Perspective drawing of two tables	207C						
In the Studio	208		Oil on canvas	1884		The Hyde Collection, Glens Falls, New York	
In the Studio	209		Watercolor on paper			Philadelphia Museum of Art, Philadelphia, Pennsylvania	Unfinished
A.B. Frost	210		Oil on canvas	c. 1884		Philadelphia Museum of Art, Philadelphia, Pennsylvania	
Study for A.B. Frost	210A		Oil on cardboard			Detroit Institute of Arts, Detroit, Michigan	
The Veteran	211		Oil on canvas	c. 1886		Yale University Art Gallery, New Haven, Connecticut	
Mrs. William Shaw Ward	212		Oil on canvas				Auctioned at Sothebys NY, December 2, 2010; sold for $242,500.
The Artist's Wife and His Setter Dog	213		Oil on canvas	1885		Metropolitan Museum of Art, New York	
Professor George F. Barker	214	Photograph of Eakins's original portrait of Barker.	Oil on canvas	1886		Mitchell Museum at Cedarhurst, Mount Vernon, Illinois	Originally 3/4-length and 60×40 inches, cut down to head-and-bust and 24×20 inches.
Sketch for Professor George F. Barker	215		Oil on cardboard	1886		Philadelphia Museum of Art, Philadelphia, Pennsylvania	Doubled sided – one side is a sketch for Professor George F. Barker. The other side depicts seated figures.
Professor William D. Marks	216		Oil on canvas	1886		Washington University Gallery of Art, St. Louis, Missouri	
Professor William D. Marks (unfinished)	217		Oil on canvas	c. 1886	76 × 54	Iris & B. Gerald Cantor Center for Visual Arts, Stanford, California	
Miss Sophie Brooks	217A		Oil				
Frank McDowell	218		Oil on canvas	c. 1886		Virginia Museum of Fine Arts, Richmond, Virginia	Auctioned at Christie's NY, December 9, 1983; sold for $80,000.
Frank MacDowell (unfinished)	219		Oil on canvas			Hirshhorn Museum and Sculpture Garden, Washington, D.C.	
Portrait of Walt Whitman	220		Oil on canvas	1887–1888		Pennsylvania Academy of the Fine Arts, Philadelphia, Pennsylvania	
Sketch for Walt Whitman	221		Oil on wood	Probably 1887		Museum of Fine Arts, Boston, Boston, Massachusetts	
Mrs. Letitia Wilson Jordan	222		Oil on canvas	1888		Brooklyn Museum of Art, New York City	
Sketch for Mrs. Letitia Wilson Jordan Bacon	223		Oil on cardboard			Philadelphia Museum of Art, Philadelphia, Pennsylvania	
Cowboys in the Badlands	224		Oil on canvas	1888		Anschutz collection, Denver, Colorado	Auctioned at Christie's NY, May 22, 2003; sold for $5,383,500. Set a record for an Eakins painting at auction.
Sketches for Cowboys in the Badlands	225		Oil on cardboard			Albright-Knox Art Gallery, Buffalo, New York	Originally part of the same work with G-225A and G-225B.
Sketch of a saddle	225A		Oil on canvas on cardboard	1887		Philadelphia Museum of Art, Philadelphia, Pennsylvania	Originally part of the same work with G-225 and G-225B.
Study of a stirrup	225B						Originally part of the same work with G-225 and G-225A.
Sketch for Cowboys in the Badlands	226		Oil on canvas			Denver Art Museum, Denver, Colorado	Deaccessioned by the Philadelphia Museum of Art, April 2008, to fund the co-purchase (with PAFA) of The Gross Clinic.
The Bad Lands	227		Oil on canvas mounted on cardboard			Philadelphia Museum of Art, Philadelphia, Pennsylvania	
Study for Cowboys in the Badlands	227A		Oil on canvas		10 3/8 × 13 1/2		Auctioned at Sothebys NY, October 17, 1980; sold for $8,000.
Landscape sketch for Cowboys in the Badlands	228		Oil on canvas mounted on cardboard			Philadelphia Museum of Art, Philadelphia, Pennsylvania	Originally double sided with G-228A.
Landscape sketch for Cowboys in the Badlands	228A		Oil on canvas mounted on cardboard			Philadelphia Museum of Art, Philadelphia, Pennsylvania	Originally double sided with G-228.
Cowboy Riding	229		Oil on canvas mounted on cardboard			Denver Art Museum, Denver, Colorado	Deaccessioned from the Philadelphia Museum of Art, April 2008, to fund the co-purchase (with PAFA) of The Gross Clinic.
Cowboy (sketches)	230		Oil on canvas mounted on cardboard				Edward Boulton posed as the model for the cowboy.
Cowboy Riding	230A		Oil on canvas		10 1/4 × 14 1/4		Auctioned at Freeman's Philadelphia, June 22, 2003; sold for $12,000.
Cowboy (sketch)	231		Oil on canvas mounted on cardboard				
Edward W. Boulton	232			c. 1888			Destroyed by vandalism – "The portrait of [Edward W.] Boulton by Eakins was lent to the University Club for an exhibit, and a waiter ran amuck and slashed it up."
Douglass M. Hall	233		Oil on canvas	c. 1888		Philadelphia Museum of Art, Philadelphia, Pennsylvania	Used as cover image for the album "Kapitulation" by the German indie rock band Tocotronic.
Girl in a Big Hat (Portrait of Lillian Hammitt)	234		Oil on canvas	c. 1888		Hirshhorn Museum and Sculpture Garden, Washington, D.C.	Hammitt paraded through the streets in a bathing suit and claimed to be Mrs. Thomas Eakins. She was committed to a mental hospital.
The Agnew Clinic	235		Oil on canvas	1889		University of Pennsylvania School of Medicine, Philadelphia, Pennsylvania	
Drawing of David Hayes Agnew	235A		Ink and pencil on paper	c. 1889	9 9/16 x 6 1/16	Philadelphia Museum of Art	
Sketch for the Agnew Clinic	236		Oil on canvas mounted on cardboard			Virginia Museum of Fine Arts, Richmond, Virginia	
Study of Dr. D. Hayes Agnew	237		Oil on canvas	1889		Yale University Art Gallery, New Haven, Connecticut	
Samuel Murray	238		Oil on canvas	1889		Mitchell Museum at Cedarhurst, Mount Vernon, Illinois	
Dr. Horatio C. Wood	239		Oil on canvas	c. 1889		Detroit Institute of Arts, Detroit, Michigan	
Professor George W. Fetter	240		Oil on canvas	1890		Collection of the School District of Philadelphia, Philadelphia, Pennsylvania	Rediscovered in 2004 by janitors in the boiler room of a Philadelphia school. Currently in an undisclosed location.
Drawing for Professor George W. Fetter	241		Black ink on white tile				
Portrait of Talcott Williams	242		Oil on canvas	c. 1890		National Portrait Gallery, Washington, D.C.	
The Bohemian: Portrait of Franklin Louis Schenk	243		Oil on canvas	c. 1890		Philadelphia Museum of Art, Philadelphia, Pennsylvania	
F.L. Schenk	244		Oil on canvas	c. 1890		Delaware Art Museum, Wilmington, Delaware	
F.L. Schenk	245		Oil on cardboard	c. 1890		Private collection	
The Father of F.L. Schenk	246		Oil on canvas	c. 1890		Collection of Nelson C. White	
Head of a Cowboy	247		Oil on canvas	c. 1890		Mead Art Museum, Amherst, Massachusetts	
Home Ranch	248		Oil on canvas	c. 1890		Philadelphia Museum of Art, Philadelphia, Pennsylvania	
Cowboy Singing	249		Watercolor on paper	c. 1890		Metropolitan Museum of Art, New York	
Cowboy Singing	250		Oil on canvas	c. 1890		Jointly owned by Anschutz collection and Denver Art Museum, Denver, Colorado	Deaccessioned from the Philadelphia Museum of Art, April 2008, to fund (with PAFA) the co-purchase of "The Gross Clinic."
Thomas B. Harned	251		Oil on canvas	c. 1890	24 x 20	Collection of Dr. and Mrs. Herbert S. Harned, Jr. On long-term loan to the Ackland Art Museum, Chapel Hill, North Carolina	
Dr. Joseph Leidy II (also known as "Portrait of Man with Red Necktie")	252		Oil on canvas	1890	50 x 36		Deassessioned from Newark Museum, Newark, New Jersey. Auctioned at Sotheby's New York, 19 May 2021. Sold for $362,800.
Dr. Joseph Leidy II (unfinished)	253		Oil on canvas				
William H. Macdowell	254		Oil on canvas	c. 1890		Yale University Art Gallery, New Haven, Connecticut	
Phidias Studying for the Frieze of the Parthenon	255		Oil on wood	c. 1890		Collection of the Eakins Press Foundation	Originally double sided with G-255A until the two images were split.
Two Nude Youths on Prancing Horses	255A		Oil on wood	c. 1890			Originally double sided with G-255 until the two images were split.
The Red Shawl	256		Oil on canvas	c. 1890		Philadelphia Museum of Art, Philadelphia, Pennsylvania	
Francis J. Ziegler (also known as "The Critic")	257		Oil on canvas	c. 1890		Fogg Art Museum, Cambridge, Massachusetts	
The Art Student: Portrait of James Wright	258		Oil on canvas	c. 1890		Crystal Bridges Museum of American Art, Bentonville, Arkansas	Ex collection: Maloogian Collection, on loan to Detroit Institute of Arts, Detroit, Michigan
The Black Fan	259		Oil on canvas	c. 1891		Philadelphia Museum of Art, Philadelphia, Pennsylvania	
William H. Macdowell	260		Oil on canvas	c. 1891		Taubman Museum of Art, Roanoke, Virginia	
William H. Macdowell (study)	261		Oil on canvas	c. 1891		Randolph-Macon Woman's College Art Gallery, Lynchburg, Virginia	
Portrait of William H. MacDowell	262		Paper on a stretcher			Baltimore Museum of Art, Baltimore, Maryland	Unfinished
Study for William H. MacDowell	262A		Oil on canvas			Hirshhorn Museum and Sculpture Garden, Washington, D.C.	
Miss Amelia Van Buren	263		Oil on canvas	c. 1891		The Phillips Collection, Washington, D.C.	
Professor Henry A. Rowland	264		Oil on canvas	1897		Addison Gallery of American Art, Andover, Massachusetts	
Sketch for Professor Henry A. Rowland	265		Oil on canvas			Addison Gallery of American Art, Andover, Massachusetts	
The Concert Singer	266		Oil on canvas	1890–1892		Philadelphia Museum of Art, Philadelphia, Pennsylvania	
Sketch for the Concert Singer	267		Oil on canvas mounted on wood			Philadelphia Museum of Art, Philadelphia, Pennsylvania	
Study for Weda Cook and Statue	267A		Oil on canvas			Blanton Museum of Art, Austin, Texas	Also known as "The Opera Singer." On the reverse is "Woman on balcony waving white handkerchief."
Joshua Ballinger Lippincott	268		Oil on canvas	1892		Philadelphia Museum of Art, Philadelphia, Pennsylvania	
Study for Joshua Ballinger Lippincott	268A		Oil	1892		Hirshhorn Museum and Sculpture Garden, Washington, D.C.	
Miss Blanche Hurlburt	269		Oil on canvas	c. 1892		Philadelphia Museum of Art, Philadelphia, Pennsylvania	
Dr. Jacob M. Da Costa	270		Oil on canvas	1893		Pennsylvania Hospital	
Jacob M. Da Costa	270A		Oil on canvas				Destroyed by Thomas Eakins after DaCosta rejected it.
Sketch for Dr. Jacob M. Da Costa	271		Oil on canvas mounted on cardboard			Philadelphia Museum of Art, Philadelphia, Pennsylvania	
Girl with Puff Sleeves	272		Oil on canvas				Deaccessioned from the Hirshhorn Museum and Sculpture Garden. Auctioned at Sotheby's NY, September 29, 2010; sold for $18,750.
Frank Hamilton Cushing	273		Oil on canvas	Late 1894 or 1895		Gilcrease Museum, Tulsa, Oklahoma	
Study for Frank Hamilton Cushing	274		Oil on canvas			Hirshhorn Museum and Sculpture Garden, Washington, D.C.	
Mrs. Frank Hamilton Cushing	275		Oil on canvas	c. 1894 or 1895		Philadelphia Museum of Art, Philadelphia, Pennsylvania	
Study of James MacAlister (also known as "Man in the Red Necktie")	276		Oil on canvas mounted on cardboard	ca. 1895		Metropolitan Museum of Art, New York	Originally double sided with G-276A until the two images were split.
Study for William L. MacLean	276A		Oil on canvas mounted on cardboard	ca. 1895			Originally double sided with G-276 until the two images were split.
Weda Cook	277		Oil on canvas	c. 1895		Columbus Museum of Art, Columbus, Ohio	
The Pianist (Stanley Addicks)	278		Oil on canvas	c. 1895		Indianapolis Museum of Art, Indianapolis, Indiana	
Katherine Maud Cook	279		Oil on canvas	1895		Yale University Art Gallery, New Haven, Connecticut	
Riter Fitzgerald	280		Oil on canvas	1895		Art Institute of Chicago, Chicago, Illinois	
Sketch for Riter Fitzgerald	281		Oil on canvas mounted on cardboard			The Huntington Library, San Marino, California	
Sketch for Riter Fitzgerald	282		Oil on canvas				
Study for Mrs. Hubbard	283		Oil on canvas mounted on cardboard	c. 1895		Sewell C. Biggs Museum of American Art, Dover, Delaware	Study for now-destroyed portrait of Mrs. Hubbard. Auctioned at Sotheby's NY, March 11, 1999; sold for $34,500.
John McLure Hamilton	284		Oil on canvas	1895		Wadsworth Atheneum, Hartford, Connecticut	
Sketch for John McLure Hamilton	285		Oil on canvas mounted on cardboard		14 5/8 × 10 5/8	Georgia Museum of Art, Athens, Georgia	
Mrs. Charles L. Leonard	286		Oil on cardboard	1895		Thomas Colville Fine Art	Deaccessioned from Hirshhorn Museum and Sculpture Garden. Auctioned at Christie's NY, March 3, 2011; sold for $25,000.
Miss Gertrude Murray	287		Oil on canvas	1895		Dallas Museum of Art, Dallas, Texas	
Charles Linford	288		Oil on canvas	c. 1895			Ex collection: IBM. Auctioned at Sotheby's NY, Mat 25, 1995; sold for $80,000.
Captain Joseph Lapsley Wilson	289		Oil on canvas	c. 1895	30 × 22	Collection of the First Troop Philadelphia City Cavalry	
Sketch for Captain Joseph Lapsley Wilson	290		Oil on canvas mounted on cardboard	c. 1895	7¾ × 5 1/4		Auctioned at Christie's NY, June 3, 1983; sold for $9000. Ex collection: Gulf States Paper Corporation, Tuscaloosa, Alabama (1983-2013). Auctioned at Christie's New York, September 25, 2013, Lot 196, Unsold.
The Cello Player	291		Oil on canvas	1896		Private collection	Deaccessioned from the Pennsylvania Academy of the Fine Arts, 2007, to fund the co-purchase (with PMA) of "The Gross Clinic."
Sketch for the Cello Player	292		Oil on canvas	1896		Heckscher Museum of Art, Huntington, New York	
Mrs. James Mapes Dodge	293		Oil on canvas	1896		Philadelphia Museum of Art, Philadelphia, Pennsylvania	
Harrison S. Morris	294		Oil on canvas	1896		Pennsylvania Academy of the Fine Arts, Philadelphia, Pennsylvania	
Sketch for Harrison S. Morris	295		Oil on canvas mounted on cardboard			Newark Museum, Newark, New Jersey	
Professor William Woolsey Johnson	295A		Oil on canvas	c. 1896		M. H. de Young Memorial Museum, San Francisco, California	
Dr. Charles Lester Leonard	296		Oil on canvas	1897		Collection of the University of Pennsylvania School of Medicine, Philadelphia, Pennsylvania	
Jennie Dean Kershaw (Mrs. Samuel Murray)	297		Oil on canvas	c. 1897		Sheldon Museum of Art, Lincoln, Nebraska	
Mrs. Samuel Murray (unfinished)	298		Oil on canvas			Baltimore Museum of Art, Baltimore, Maryland	
Miss Lucy Lewis	299		Oil on canvas	c. 1897		Philadelphia Museum of Art, Philadelphia, Pennsylvania	
Miss Anna Lewis	300		Oil on canvas	c. 1898		Hirshhorn Museum and Sculpture Garden, Washington, D.C.	
William H. MacDowell with a Hat	301		Oil on canvas	c. 1898		Taubman Museum of Art, Roanoke, Virginia	
General E. Burd Grubb	302		Oil on canvas	Probably 1898		Yale University Art Gallery, New Haven, Connecticut	
Taking the Count	303		Oil on canvas	1898		Yale University Art Gallery, New Haven, Connecticut	
Sketch for Taking the Count	304		Oil on canvas mounted on cardboard	1898		Yale University Art Gallery, New Haven, Connecticut	
Sketch for Taking the Count	305		Oil on canvas			Hirshhorn Museum and Sculpture Garden, Washington, D.C.	
The Referee, H. Walter Schlichter	306		Oil on canvas	1898		Hirshhorn Museum and Sculpture Garden, Washington, D.C.	
Maybelle	307		Oil on canvas	1898		Frye Art Museum, Seattle, Washington	
Sketch for Maybelle	308		Oil on canvas mounted on cardboard				
John N. Fort	309		Oil on canvas	1898		Williams College Museum of Art, Williamstown, Massachusetts	
Salutat	310		Oil on canvas	1898		Addison Gallery of American Art, Phillips Academy	
Study for Salutat	311		Oil on canvas	1898		Carnegie Museum of Art, Pittsburgh, Pennsylvania	
Between Rounds	312		Oil on canvas	1898–1899		Philadelphia Museum of Art, Philadelphia, Pennsylvania	
Sketch for Between Rounds	313		Oil on cardboard			Hirshhorn Museum and Sculpture Garden, Washington, D.C.	Double sided – one side is a study for "Between Rounds;" the other side is a landscape sketch.
Billy Smith (sketch)	314		Oil on canvas	c. 1898		Philadelphia Museum of Art, Philadelphia, Pennsylvania	
Billy Smith (study)	315		Oil on canvas	1898		Wichita Art Museum, Wichita, Kansas	
The Timer	316		Oil on canvas	1898		New Britain Museum of American Art, New Britain, Connecticut	
Wrestlers	317		Oil on canvas	1899		Los Angeles County Museum of Art, Los Angeles County, California	
Study for Wrestlers	318		Oil on canvas			Los Angeles County Museum of Art, Los Angeles County, California	
Wrestlers (unfinished)	319		Oil on canvas	1899		Philadelphia Museum of Art, Philadelphia, Pennsylvania	
The Fairman Rogers Four-in-Hand (black & white)	320		Oil on canvas	1899		St. Louis Art Museum, St. Louis, Missouri	Black & white version of the 1879–80 original. Painted to be photographed as an illustration for Fairman Rogers, A Manual of Coaching (Philadelphia, 1900).
T. Ellwood Potts	321			1890–1900			
Mrs. T Ellwood Potts	322			c. 1890–1900			
Addie: A Woman in Black (Portrait of Miss Mary Adeline Williams)	323		Oil on canvas	c. 1899		Art Institute of Chicago, Chicago, Illinois	In Eakins Revealed (pp. 369–371), author Henry Adams claims that Mary Adeline "Addie" Williams, an Eakins family friend, was the nude model for G-451 William Rush and his Model, and related studies G-445, G-446, G-447, G-452, G-453 and G-454.
Benjamin Eakins	324		Oil on canvas	c. 1899		Philadelphia Museum of Art, Philadelphia, Pennsylvania	
Mrs. Thomas Eakins	325		Oil on canvas	c. 1899		Hirshhorn Museum and Sculpture Garden, Washington, D.C.	
Mrs. William H. Green	326		Oil on canvas	1899		Driscoll Babcock Galleries	Deaccessioned from the Hirshhorn Museum and Sculpture Garden. Auctioned at Sotheby's NY, September 29, 2010; sold for $31,250.
The Dean's Roll Call	327		Oil on canvas	1899		Museum of Fine Arts, Boston, Boston, Massachusetts	
Louis Husson	328		Oil on canvas	1899		National Gallery of Art, Washington, D.C.	
David Wilson Jordan	329		Oil on canvas	1899		The Huntington Library, San Marino, California	
Study for David Wilson Jordan	329A		Oil				
William Merritt Chase	330		Oil on canvas	c. 1899		Hirshhorn Museum and Sculpture Garden, Washington, DC.	
The Thinker: Portrait of Louis N. Kenton	331		Oil on canvas	1900		Metropolitan Museum of Art, New York	
Sketch for The Thinker	332		Oil on cardboard mounted on wood			Farnsworth Art Museum, Rockland, Maine	Originally double sided with G-365A until the two images were split.
Addie (also known as "Portrait of Mary Adeline Williams")	333		Oil on canvas	1900		Philadelphia Museum of Art, Philadelphia, Pennsylvania	
Mrs. Mary Arthur	334		Oil on canvas	1900		Metropolitan Museum of Art, New York	
Robert M. Lindsay	335		Oil on canvas	1900		Detroit Institute of Arts, Detroit, Michigan	
Sketch for Robert M. Lindsay	336		Oil on wood			Detroit Institute of Arts, Detroit, Michigan	
Frank Jay St. John	337		Oil on canvas	1900		M. H. de Young Memorial Museum, San Francisco, California	
Antiquated Music: Portrait of Sarah Sagehorn Frishmuth	338		Oil on canvas	1900		Philadelphia Museum of Art, Philadelphia, Pennsylvania	
Mrs. Joseph H. Drexel	339		Oil on canvas unstretched	1900			Deaccessioned from the Hirshhorn Museum and Sculpture Garden. Auctioned at Christie's NY, May 18, 2011; sold for $68,500.
Sketch for Mrs. Joseph H. Drexel	340		Oil on cardboard	c. 1900			
Dr. Daniel Garrison Brinton	340A		Oil			Collection of the American Philosophical Society.	
Clara J. Mather	341		Oil on canvas	c. 1900		Musée d'Orsay, Paris, France	
A Woman in Black (Portrait of Clara J. Mather)	342		Oil on wood				
Elizabeth R. Coffin	343		Oil on canvas	c. 1900		Coffin School collection, Egan Institute of Maritime Studies, Nantucket, Massachusetts	
Dr. Edward J. Nolan	344		Oil on canvas	c. 1900		Philadelphia Museum of Art, Philadelphia, Pennsylvania	
Henry O. Tanner	345		Oil on canvas	c. 1900		The Hyde Collection, Glens Falls, New York	
Honorable John A. Thorton	346		Oil on canvas			Schwarz Gallery, Philadelphia, Pennsylvania	
Monsignor James P. Turner	347		Oil on canvas	c. 1900			Eakins later painted a full-length portrait of Monsignor Turner (G-438); sketch (G-439). Deassessioned from St. Charles Borromeo Seminary, Wynnewood, Pennsylvania; Auctioned at Christie's NY, November 19, 2015; sold for $221,000.
Portrait of Leslie W. Miller	348		Oil on canvas	1901		Philadelphia Museum of Art, Philadelphia, Pennsylvania	
Sketch for Professor Leslie W. Miller	349		Oil on cardboard	c. 1892–1894		Philadelphia Museum of Art, Philadelphia, Pennsylvania	Double sided: one side depicts Leslie W. Miller. The reverse depicts Thomas Eakins' dog, Harry.
Signature for 'Leslie W. Miller'	349A		Drawing			Hirshhorn Museum and Sculpture Garden, Washington, D.C.	
Mrs. Leslie W. Miller	350		Oil on canvas	1901			
Mrs. Elizabeth Duane Gillespie	351		Oil on canvas	1901		Collection of the Philadelphia Museum of Art, gift of the Women's Committee	
Sketch for Mrs. Elizabeth Duane Gillespie	352		Oil on canvas			Hirshhorn Museum and Sculpture Garden, Washington, D.C.	
George Morris	353		Oil on canvas	1901			
Reverend Philip R. McDevitt	354		Oil on canvas	1901		Snite Museum of Art, Notre Dame, Indiana	
Charles F. Haseltine	355		Oil on canvas	c. 1901		Montclair Art Museum, Montclair, New Jersey	
Elbridge Ayer Burbank	356			c. 1901			
Alfred F. Watch	357			c. 1901			
Self-Portrait	358		Oil on canvas	1902		National Academy of Design, New York	
Self-portrait	358A		Oil on canvas	c. 1902		Hirshhorn Museum and Sculpture Garden, Washington, D.C.	
Colonel Alfred Reynolds	359		Oil on canvas	1902		Taubman Museum of Art, Roanoke, Virginia	
Signora Gomez D'Arza	360		Oil on canvas	1902		Metropolitan Museum of Art, New York	
His Eminence Sebastiano Cardinal Martinelli	361		Oil on canvas	1901–02		Hammer Museum, Los Angeles	
Perspective drawing for his Eminence Sebastiano Cardinal Martinelli	361A		Drawing			Joslyn Art Museum, Omaha, Nebraska	
Perspective drawing for his Eminence Sebastiano Cardinal Martinelli	361B		Drawing			Joslyn Art Museum, Omaha, Nebraska	
Very Reverend John J. Fedigan	362		Oil on canvas	1902		Collection of the Augustinian Province of St. Thomas of Villanova. On permanent loan to Villanova University, Villanova, Pennsylvania	
Sketch for the Very Reverend John J. Fedigan	363		Oil on canvas				Deaccessioned from the Hirshhorn Museum and Sculpture Garden. Auctioned at Christie's NY, September 27, 2011; sold for $10,625.
The Translator	364		Oil on canvas	1902			Deassessioned from St. Charles Borromeo Seminary, Wynnewood, Pennsylvania
Monsignor James F. Loughlin	365		Oil on canvas	1902			Deassessioned from St. Charles Borromeo Seminary, Wynnewood, Pennsylvania
Study for Monsignor James F. Loughlin	365A		Oil on cardboard mounted on wood				Originally double sided with G-332 until the two images were split. Auctioned at Bonham's San Francisco, November 29, 2005; sold for $15,000.
John Seely Hart	366		Oil on canvas	1902		Collection of the School District of Philadelphia, Philadelphia, Pennsylvania	Dr. Hart (1810–1877) was principal of Philadelphia's Central High School when Eakins was a student. Eakins painted the posthumous portrait from a photograph. Rediscovered in 2004 by janitors in the boiler room of a Philadelphia school, it is currently in an undisclosed location.
Charles E. Dana	367		Oil on canvas	c. 1902		Pennsylvania Academy of the Fine Arts, Philadelphia, Pennsylvania	
The Young Man (Kern Dodge)	368		Oil on canvas	c. 1902		Philadelphia Museum of Art, Philadelphia, Pennsylvania	
Miss Mary Perkins (unfinished)	369		Oil on canvas	c. 1902			
Girl with a Fan	370		Oil on canvas	c. 1902		Pennsylvania Academy of Fine Arts, Philadelphia, Pennsylvania	
Adam S. Bare	371		Oil on canvas	1903			
Walter Copeland Bryant	372		Oil on canvas	1903		Collection of the Brockton Public Library, Brockton, Massachusetts	
Dr. Matthew H. Cryer	373		Oil on canvas	1903		Private collection	
Archbishop William Henry Elder	374		Oil on canvas	1903	66 3/16 × 45 3/16	Cincinnati Art Museum, Cincinnati, Ohio	
Mother Patricia Waldron	375		Sketch. Oil on canvas mounted on cardboard	1903		Philadelphia Museum of Art, Philadelphia, Pennsylvania	Study for completed portrait, G-487 (lost, probably destroyed). See below.
Bishop Edmond F. Prendergast	376		Oil on canvas				Lost, possibly destroyed: "Murray told Eakins biographer Lloyd Goodrich that he had it 'from a reliable source' that the painting, which Murray considered 'superb' was somehow disposed of."
James A. Flaherty	377		Oil on canvas	1903			Deassessioned from St. Charles Borromeo Seminary, Wynnewood, Pennsylvania; Auctioned at Christie's NY, May 19, 2016; sold for $185,000.
William B. Kurtz	378		Oil on canvas	1903		Philadelphia Museum of Art, Philadelphia, Pennsylvania	2015 bequest of Daniel W. Dietrich II.
Miss Alice Kurtz	379		Oil on canvas	1903		Fogg Art Museum, Cambridge, Massachusetts	
Mrs. Mary Hallock Greenewalt	380		Oil on canvas	1903		Wichita Art Museum, Wichita, Kansas	
Dr. Frank Lindsay Greenewalt	381		Oil on canvas	1903		Private collection, Delaware	
Dr. Frank Lindsay Greenewalt	381A		Oil				
Mrs. Anna A. Kershaw	382		Oil on canvas	1903			Deaccessioned from Sheldon Museum of Art, Lincoln, Nebraska. Auctioned at Sotheby's NY, December 5, 2015; sold for $187,500.
Ruth (Portrait of Ruth Harding)	383		Oil on canvas	1903		White House Art Collection, Washington, D.C.	
An Actress: Portrait of Suzanne Santje	384		Oil on canvas	1903		Philadelphia Museum of Art, Philadelphia, Pennsylvania	
Study for An Actress	385		Oil on canvas mounted on cardboard				Deaccessioned from the Hirshhorn Museum and Sculpture Garden. Auctioned at Christie's NY, December 1, 2010; sold for $100,900.
Miss Betty Reynolds	386		Oil on canvas	c. 1903			Deaccessioned from the Hirshhorn Museum and Sculpture Garden. Auctioned at Christie's New York, March 1, 2012; sold for $22,500.
The Oboe Player	387		Oil on canvas	1903		Philadelphia Museum of Art, Philadelphia, Pennsylvania	
Rear-Admiral Charles D. Sigsbee	388		Oil on canvas	1903			Auctioned at Sotheby's NY, May 22, 2008; sold for $1,945,000.
Mrs. M.S. Stokes	389		Oil on canvas	1903		Arkell Museum, Canajoharie, New York	
Mrs. Richard Day	390		Oil on canvas	c. 1903		Hirshhorn Museum and Sculpture Garden, Washington, D.C.	
Mother (Portrait of Annie Williams Gandy)	391		Oil on canvas	c. 1903		Smithsonian American Art Museum	Donated to the Smithsonian by Annie Gandy's daughters, Lucy Rodman and Helen Gandy.
Mrs. Helen MacKnight (also known as "The Lady in Grey" and "Portrait of a Mother")	392		Oil on canvas	c. 1903		Hirshhorn Museum and Sculpture Garden, Washington, D.C.	
Francesco Romano	393			c. 1903			Auctioned at Christie's NY, May 26, 1994; sold for $80,000. Auctioned at Sotheby's NY, November 29, 2012; sold for $146,500.
Robert C. Ogden	394		Oil on canvas	1904			Deaccessioned from Hirshhorn Museum and Sculpture Garden. Auctioned at Christie's NY, May 20, 2009; sold for $338,500.
Study for Robert C. Ogden	394A		Oil				Deaccessioned from Hirshhorn Museum and Sculpture Garden. Auctioned at Christie's NY, March 3, 2011; sold for $32,500.
J. Carroll Beckwith	395		Oil on canvas	1904		San Diego Museum of Art, San Diego, California	
Charles Percival Buck	396		Oil on canvas	1904		Princeton University Art Museum, Princeton, New Jersey	
Mrs. James G. Carville (Portrait of Harriet Husson Carville)	397		Oil on canvas	1904		National Gallery of Art, Washington, D.C.	
Mrs. Kern Dodge	398		Oil on canvas	1904		Private Collection. Los Angeles	
Mrs. Kern Dodge	399		Oil on canvas				
Miss Beatrice Fenton (also known as "The Coral Necklace")	400		Oil on canvas	1904		Butler Institute of American Art, Youngstown, Ohio	
William R. Hallowell	401		Oil on canvas	1904			
Music	402		Oil on canvas	1904		Albright-Knox Art Gallery, Buffalo, New York	
Sketch for Music	403		Oil on canvas mounted on cardboard			Philadelphia Museum of Art, Philadelphia, Pennsylvania	
The Violinist	404		Oil on canvas	1904		Hirshhorn Museum and Sculpture Garden, Washington, D.C.	
Samuel Myers	405		Oil on canvas	1904		Hirshhorn Museum and Sculpture Garden, Washington, D.C.	
Frank B.A. Linton	406		Oil on canvas	1904		Hirshhorn Museum and Sculpture Garden, Washington, D.C.	
Mrs. Edith Mahon	407		Oil on canvas	1904		Smith College Museum of Art, Northampton, Massachusetts	
Rear-Admiral George W. Melville	408		Oil on canvas	1904		Philadelphia Museum of Art, Philadelphia, Pennsylvania	Eakins painted a later portrait of Melville, see G-420.
William Murray	409		Oil on canvas	c. 1904			
Mrs. Matilda Searight	410		Oil on canvas	1904		La Salle University Art Gallery, Philadelphia, Pennsylvania	
Edward Taylor Snow	411		Oil on canvas	1904		Philadelphia Museum of Art, Philadelphia, Pennsylvania	
B.J. Blommers	412			1904		Toledo Museum of Art, Toledo, Ohio	
Mrs. B.J. Blommers	413			1904			
Charles P. Gruppe	414		Oil on canvas	1904	22" × 18"	Private Collection. New York City	
A. Bryan Wall	414A		Oil			Bowdoin College Museum of Art, Brunswick, Maine	
Joseph R. Woodwell	415		Oil on canvas	1904		Carnegie Museum of Art, Pittsburgh, Pennsylvania	
William H. MacDowell	416		Oil on canvas	c. 1904		Memorial Art Gallery, University of Rochester, New York	
Walter MacDowell	417		Oil on canvas	c. 1904		Taubman Museum of Art, Roanoke, Virginia	
William H. Lippincott	418			Late 1904 or early 1905			
Edward W. Redfield	419		Oil on canvas	1905		National Academy of Design, New York	
Rear-Admiral George W. Melville	420		Oil on canvas	1905		National Gallery of Art, Washington, D.C.	Eakins painted an earlier portrait of Melville, see G-408.
Mrs. George Morris	421		Oil on canvas	1905			
Professor William Smith Forbes	422		Oil on canvas	1905		Private collection	Deaccessioned from Thomas Jefferson University, Philadelphia, Pennsylvania in 2007.
Charles L. Fussell	423		Oil on canvas	c. 1905		Montclair Art Museum, Montclair, New Jersey	
Study for Charles L. Fussell	423A		Oil on board	c. 1905			Deaccessioned from the Hirshhorn Museum and Sculpture Garden. Auctioned at Christie's NY, March 1, 2012; sold for $27,500.
Miss Florence Einstein	424		Oil on canvas	1905		Currier Museum of Art, Manchester, New Hampshire	
Monsignor Diomede Falconio	425		Oil on canvas	1905		National Gallery of Art, Washington, D.C.	
John B. Gest	426		Oil on canvas	1905		Museum of Fine Arts, Houston, Houston, Texas	
Asbury.W. Lee	427		Oil on canvas	1905		Reynolda House Museum of American Art, Winston-Salem, North Carolina	
Miss Elizabeth L. Burton	428		Oil on canvas	c. 1905		Minneapolis Institute of Arts, Minneapolis, Minnesota	
Dr. Thomas H. Fenton	429		Oil on canvas	c. 1905		Delaware Art Museum, Wilmington, Delaware	
Mrs. Louis Husson (Annie C. Lochrey)	430		Oil on canvas	c. 1905		National Gallery of Art, Washington, D.C.	
Maurice Feeley	431		Oil on canvas	c. 1905			Deaccessioned from the Hirshhorn Museum and Sculpture Garden. Auctioned at Christie's NY, March 3, 2011; sold for $27,500
Genjiro Yeto	432			1906			
A Singer: Portrait of Mrs. W.H. Bowden	433		Oil on canvas	1906		Princeton University Art Museum, Princeton, New Jersey	
A Singer: Portrait of Mrs. Leigo	434		Oil on canvas	c. 1906		Berry-Hill Galleries, New York	
Richard Wood	435		Oil on canvas	1906			
Master Alfred Douty	436		Oil on canvas	1906		Santa Barbara Museum of Art, Santa Barbara, California	
A Little Girl	437		Oil on canvas	c. 1906		Philadelphia Museum of Art, Philadelphia, Pennsylvania	
Monsignor James P. Turner	438		Oil on canvas	c. 1906		Nelson-Atkins Museum of Art, Kansas City, Missouri	Eakins painted an earlier head-and-bust portrait of Monsignor Turner (c. 1900), G-347.
Sketches	439		Oil on cardboard			Philadelphia Museum of Art, Philadelphia, Pennsylvania	Double sided: one side is a sketch for Monsignor James P. Turner. The reverse is a sketch for William Rush and His Model (Honolulu), G-451. Related to G-454.
Thomas J. Eagan	440		Oil on canvas	1907		Terra Museum, Chicago, Illinois	Auctioned at Christie's NY, May 21, 1998; sold for $240,000.
Dr. Albert C. Getchell	441		Oil on canvas	1907		North Carolina Museum of Art, Raleigh, North Carolina	
Dr. William Thomson	442		Oil on canvas	1907		Mütter Museum, College of Physicians of Philadelphia, Philadelphia, Pennsylvania	
Dr. William Thomson (unfinished)	443		Oil on canvas			National Gallery of Art, Washington, D.C.	
Major Manuel Waldteufel	444		Oil on canvas	1907		Hirschl and Adler Galleries, New York	Deaccessioned from French Benevolent Society of Philadelphia, 2003. Auctioned at Christie's NY, May 21, 2008; sold for $289,000.
William Rush and His Model (Brooklyn)	445		Oil on canvas	1908		Brooklyn Museum of Art, New York	
Sketch for William Rush and His Model (Brooklyn), G-445	446		Oil on wood	1908	8¾ × 10		
Sketch for William Rush and His Model (Brooklyn), G-445	447		Oil on wood			Hirshhorn Museum and Sculpture Garden, Washington, D.C.	
Studies of Rush	448		Oil on wood				Originally a collage with G-448A and G-448B until the images were split.
Study of Rush	448A		Oil on wood				Originally a collage with G-448 and G-448B until the images were split.
Study of Rush	448B		Oil on wood				Originally a collage with G-448 and G-448A until the images were split.
Study of Rush Study for William Rush and His Model (Brooklyn), G-445.	449		Oil on canvas				Auctioned at Heritage Dallas, November 9, 2009; sold for $100,380.
Study for The Chaperone (formerly called The Negress) Study for William Rush and His Model (Brooklyn), G-445.	450		Oil on canvas	c. 1908		National Gallery of Art, Washington, DC	
William Rush and His Model (Honolulu)	451		Oil on canvas	1907–1908		Honolulu Museum of Art, Honolulu, Hawaii	In Eakins Revealed (pp. 369–371), author Henry Adams claims that Mary Adeline "Addie" Williams (G-323), an Eakins family friend, was the nude model for William Rush and his Model. Related studies: G-445, G-446, G-447, G-452, G-453 and G-454.
The Model Study for William Rush and His Model (Honolulu), G-451	452		Oil on canvas			Crystal Bridges Museum of American Art, Bentonville, Arkansas	Auctioned at Sotheby's New York, May 22, 2008, sold for $1,273,000.
William Rush and His Model	453		Oil on canvas	1908		Smithsonian American Art Museum, Washington, D.C.	
Study for "William Rush's Model"	454		Oil on canvas	c. 1908			Related to G-439. Deaccessioned from Hirshhorn Museum and Sculpture Garden. Auctioned at Christie's New York, May 20, 2009; sold for $122,500. Offered at auctioned by Sotheby's New York, May 23, 2017, Lot 77, estimate: $80,000-120,000. Unsold.
Miss Eleanor S.F. Pue	455		Oil on canvas	1907			Deaccessioned from Virginia Museum of Fine Arts. Auctioned at Freeman's, Philadelphia, December 3, 2017, sold for $40,000.
Miss Rebecca MacDowell	456		Oil on canvas	c. 1908			Offered for auction at Bonham's, New York, November 28, 2012, Lot 82, estimate: $70,000-90,000. Unsold.
The Old-Fashioned Dress: Portrait of Miss Helen Parker	457		Oil on canvas	c. 1908		Philadelphia Museum of Art, Philadelphia, Pennsylvania	
Sketch for the Old-Fashioned Dress	458		Oil on cardboard			Collection of Mr. and Mrs. Daniel Dietrich II	
Study for the Old-Fashioned Dress	459		Oil on canvas	1908		Collection of Mr. and Mrs. Daniel Dietrich II	
Mrs. Lucy Langdon W. Wilson	460		Oil on canvas	1908			Auctioned at Sotheby's NY, December 3, 1998; sold for $60,000.
Mrs. Lucy Langdon W. Wilson (second version)	461		Oil on canvas	Early 1909			
Dr. William P. Wilson	462		Oil on canvas	1909			
Dr. Henry Beates Jr.	463		Oil on canvas	1909			
Henry Beates	464		Oil on canvas	c. 1909			
Edward A. Schmidt	465		Oil on canvas	c. 1909			
Reverend Cornelius J. O'Neill	466		Oil on canvas	c. 1909			
John J. Borie	467		Oil on canvas	1896-98		Hood Museum of Art, Dartmouth College, Hanover, New Hampshire	
Mrs. Nicholas Douty	468		Oil on canvas	1910		Cummer Gallery of Art, Jacksonville, Florida	
Dr. Gilbert Lafayette Parker	469		Oil on canvas	1910			Auctioned at Sotheby's NY, May 29, 1986; sold for $125,000. Auctioned at Christie's NY, May 23, 2017, Lot 59, estimate: $80,000-120,000, Unsold.
Mrs. Gilbert Parker	470		Oil on canvas	1910		Museum of Fine Arts, Boston, Boston, Massachusetts	
Gilbert Sunderland Parker	471		Oil on canvas	1910			
Ernest Lee Parker	472		Oil on canvas	1910			Deaccessioned from the Westmoreland Museum of American Art. Auctioned at Christie's NY, December 5, 2002; sold for $101,575.
President Rutherford B. Hayes	473		Oil on canvas	1912 or 1913		Philipse Manor Hall, Yonkers, New York	
Dr. Edward Anthony Spitzka	474		Oil on canvas	c. 1913		Hirshhorn Museum and Sculpture Garden, Washington, D.C.	Eakins's last painting (unfinished). This originally was a full-length portrait of Dr. Spitzka holding the cast of a brain (84×43 1/2 inches, in the 1933 Goodrich catalogue). Sometime after that, it was cut down to a head-and-bust portrait (30 1/2×25? inches).
President Rutherford B. Hayes	475			1877			"Probably no longer in existence"
James L. Wood	476			c. 1890			"Probably no longer in existence"
William Rudolf O'Donovan	477			1891 or early 1892			"Probably no longer in existence"
Miss Emily Sartain	478			Sometime in the 1890s			Presumed lost, ("Probably no longer in existence".) Passed down through the Sartain family of Philadelphia. Rita and Daniel Fraad purchased it from Babcock Galleries, New York City, in 1957. Auctioned at Sotheby's NY, December 1, 2004; sold for $170,000.
Miss Emily Sartain	479			Sometime in the 1890s			"Probably no longer in existence"
Dr. Hugh A. Clarke	480			c. 1893			"Probably no longer in existence"
James MacAlister	481			c. 1893			"Probably no longer in existence"
Circus People	482			Before 1876			Sketch. "Probably no longer in existence"
Stewart Culin	483			c. 1899			"Probably no longer in existence"
Dr. George B. Wood	484			c. 1900			"Probably no longer in existence"
Dr. Patrick J. Garvey	485		Oil on canvas	1902			Presumed to have been destroyed, rediscovered in 1959. Deassessioned from St. Charles Borromeo Seminary, Wynnewood, Pennsylvania, 2014. Offered for auction at Christie's New York, November 21, 2017, Lot 91, estimate: $70,000-100,000. Unsold.
Right Reverend Denis J. Dougherty	486			1903		Private Collection	Related to a full-length portrait of Rev. Denis J. Dougherty (c. 1906), G-438. The subject later became a Cardinal and Archbishop of Philadelphia
Mother Patricia Waldron	487			1903			"Probably no longer in existence" – loaned by the Sisters of Mercy to William Antrim, who had been commissioned to paint a new portrait of Waldron. Antrim stored the portrait in the attic of his studio. The portrait was lost when the building was demolished. For sketch, see above, G-375.
Mrs. Margaret Jane Gish	488			c. 1903			"Probably no longer in existence"
Robert C. Ogden	489						"Probably no longer in existence"
Dr. J. William White	490			1904			"Probably no longer in existence"
Adolphie Borie	491			c. 1910			"Probably no longer in existence"
Mrs. Charles Lester Leonard	492			1895			No longer in existence
Mrs. Hubbard	493			c. 1895			No longer in existence
Mrs. McKeever	494			1898			No longer in existence
Bishop Edmond F. Prendergast	495		Oil on canvas	c. 1903			No longer in existence
Frank W. Stokes	496			1903			No longer in existence
Edward S. Buckley	497			1906			No longer in existence. According to Buckley's daughter: "It was so unsatisfactory that we destroyed it, not wishing his descendants to think of their grandfather as resembling the portrait."
Studies for William Rush and His Model	498		Sculpture, pigmented wax	1876–1877		Philadelphia Museum of Art, Philadelphia, Pennsylvania	Five studies
The Mare "Josephine"	499		Sculpture, bronze	1878, cast 1930	Height: 22.125 in (56.2 cm)	Philadelphia Museum of Art, Philadelphia, Pennsylvania	Quarter-size model. Josephine was the lead horse in The Fairman Rogers Four-in-Hand (G-133). Eakins and his students created a life-size plaster model of her in 1878. Following her natural death, c.1881, the carcass was dissected and used to create plaster écorché models for teaching equine anatomy.
Horse Skeleton	500		Sculpture, painted plaster	1878	11.25 x 14.375 x 2.125 in (28.5 x 36.3 x 5.3 cm)	Hirshhorn Museum and Sculpture Garden, Washington, D.C.	Eighth-size model. A plaster cast is at the University of Michigan Museum of Art. A 1930 bronze cast is at the Butler Institute of American Art.
The Mare "Josephine": Écorché	501		Sculpture, painted plaster	1882	22 x 24 x 4 in (55.88 x 60.96 x 10.16 cm)	National Gallery of Art, Washington, D.C.	Quarter-size model. An edition of 10 bronze casts was made of this in 1979. These are at the Hood Museum of Art, Harvard Art Museums, Brandywine River Museum, Crystal Bridges Museum of American Art, and elsewhere. A painted plaster version is at the University of Michigan Museum of Art.
The Mare "Josephine": Écorché	502		Sculpture, painted plaster	1882	22.25 x 31 x 3 in (56.52 x 78.74 x 7.62 cm)	Pennsylvania Academy of the Fine Arts, Philadelphia, Pennsylvania	Quarter-size model. A 1930 bronze cast is at the Philadelphia Museum of Art.
Four models of horses for The Fairman Rogers Four-in-Hand	503		Sculpture, bronze with marble bases	1879, cast 1946	Lengths: 11.75 in (29.8 cm); 11.875 in (30.2 cm); 11.938 in (30.3 cm); 12.25 in (31.1 cm)	Philadelphia Museum of Art, Philadelphia, Pennsylvania	Eighth-size models.
Spinning	504		Sculpture, painted plaster	late-1882/ early-1883	21 x 17.375 x 4.25 in (53.24 x 44.133 x 10.8 cm)	Pennsylvania Academy of the Fine Arts, Philadelphia, Pennsylvania	PAFA also owns an 1886 bronze cast. An 1886 bronze cast is at the Philadelphia Museum of Art.
Knitting	505		Sculpture, painted plaster	1881	20.75 x 17.25 x 4.5 in (52.7 x 43.82 x 11.43 cm)	Pennsylvania Academy of the Fine Arts, Philadelphia, Pennsylvania	PAFA also owns an 1886 bronze cast. An 1886 bronze cast is at the Philadelphia Museum of Art.
Arcadia	506		Sculpture, painted plaster	1883	11.875 x 24.25 x 2.375 in (29.9 x 61.3 x 5.7 cm)	Hirshhorn Museum and Sculpture Garden, Washington, D.C.	Plaster casts are at the Philadelphia Museum of Art, Yale University Art Gallery, and elsewhere. A 1930 bronze cast is in the collection of Jamie Wyeth.
An Arcadian	507		Sculpture, painted plaster	1883		Pennsylvania Academy of the Fine Arts, Philadelphia, Pennsylvania	Susan Macdowell Eakins posed as the model.
The Youth Playing the Pipes	508		Sculpture, painted plaster	1883	20.125 x 11.5 x 1.75 in (51 x 29.1 x 4.2 cm)	Philadelphia Museum of Art, Philadelphia, Pennsylvania	Plaster casts are at the Pennsylvania Academy of the Fine Arts, and elsewhere. A 1930 bronze cast is at the Hirshhorn Museum and Sculpture Garden.
Abraham Lincoln's horse	509		Sculpture	1893–1894		Soldiers' and Sailors' Memorial Arch, Prospect Park, Brooklyn, New York City	William Rudolf O'Donovan modeled the figure of Abraham Lincoln. Originally paired with G-509A in the 1933 Goodrich catalog.
General Grant's Horse	509A	Full-size plaster model of Clinker.	Sculpture, bronze	1892		Soldiers' and Sailors' Memorial Arch, Prospect Park, Brooklyn, New York City	William Rudolf O'Donovan modeled the figure of Ulysses S. Grant. Originally listed as G-509 in the 1933 Goodrich catalog.
Clinker	510		Sculpture, bronze	1892, cast 1930	6.25 x 6.25 x 2 in (15.8 x 15.8 x 4.9 cm)	Hirshhorn Museum and Sculpture Garden, Washington, D.C.	Sixteenth-size model.
Clinker	511		Sculpture, painted plaster	1892	25.34 x 25.34 x 4.5 in (65.4 x 65.4 x 11.4 cm)	Philadelphia Museum of Art, Philadelphia, Pennsylvania	Quarter-size model. A 1930 bronze cast is also at the Philadelphia Museum of Art.
Billy	512		Sculpture, plaster	c. 1892–1893			
The American Army Crossing the Delaware	513		Sculpture, bronze relief	c. 1893		New Jersey State Museum, Trenton, New Jersey	
The Opening of the Fight, The Battle of Trenton	514		Sculpture, bronze relief	c. 1893		New Jersey State Museum, Trenton, New Jersey	
Man on Horseback: Relief	514A					Hirshhorn Museum and Sculpture Garden, Washington, D.C.	
Mrs. Mary Hallock Greenewalt	515		Sculpture, bronze relief	1905		Delaware Art Museum, Wilmington, Delaware	

== See also ==
- Conservation-restoration of Thomas Eakins' The Gross Clinic
