= Self-portrait (Thomas Eakins) =

Painting by Thomas Eakins

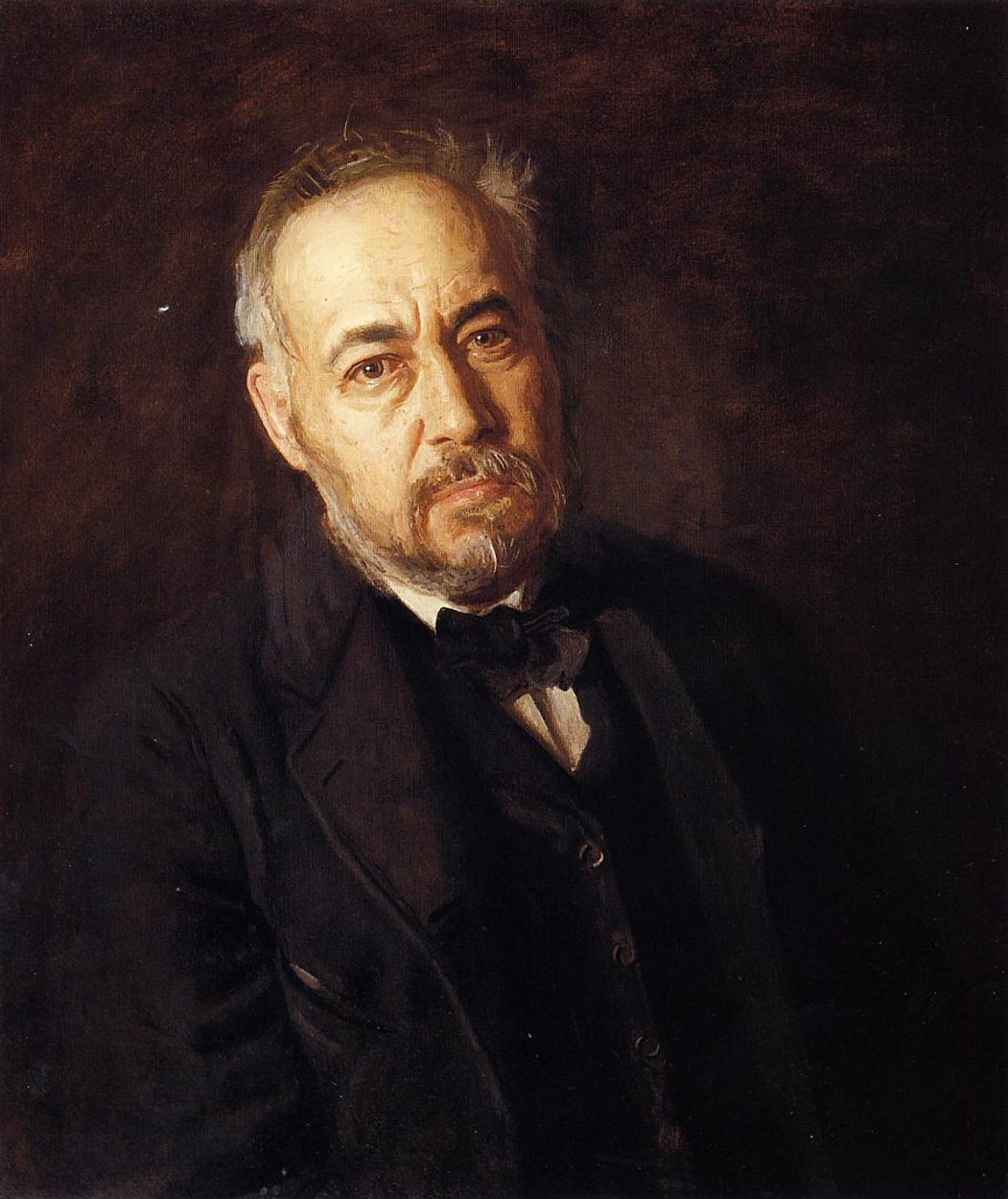
- Artist: Thomas Eakins
- Year: 1902
- Medium: Oil on canvas
- Dimensions: 76 cm × 63 cm (30 in × 25 in)
- Location: National Academy of Design; New York

Self-portrait is an oil on canvas painting by Thomas Eakins, presented as a diploma piece upon his election as an Associate member of the National Academy of Design in 1902. Although Eakins included himself as an observer or participant in group portraits and genre scenes, this and a smaller unsigned and undated oil, thought to have been made at about the same time, are the only unadorned self-portraits he ever painted. Lloyd Goodrich wrote that it "is not only one of his finest head and bust likenesses, but a revealing human document; in the direct look of his remarkable eyes one can see strength, penetrating intelligence, and a touch of ironic humor."

== Background ==
Largely due to controversies surrounding his work, Eakins was not invited to become a member of the National Academy of Design until 1902, well after many of his contemporaries. It was only in the late 1890s that his reputation benefited from a positive reassessment by his colleagues, as well as a rediscovery by a younger generation of artists and writers. Unanimously approved as an Associate-elect of the National Academy on 12 March 1902, Eakins quickly painted this self-portrait and submitted it to the Academy on 5 May, and was accepted as a full Academician at the annual meeting on 14 May; he remains the only artist in the Academy's history to be made an Associate and full Academician in the same year.

Previously Eakins had included himself in several early sporting pictures, as well as The Swimming Hole, and in his large group portraits The Agnew Clinic and The Gross Clinic, and later he would paint himself in side view for William Rush and His Model. However, the two paintings of 1902 were his only independent self-portraits.

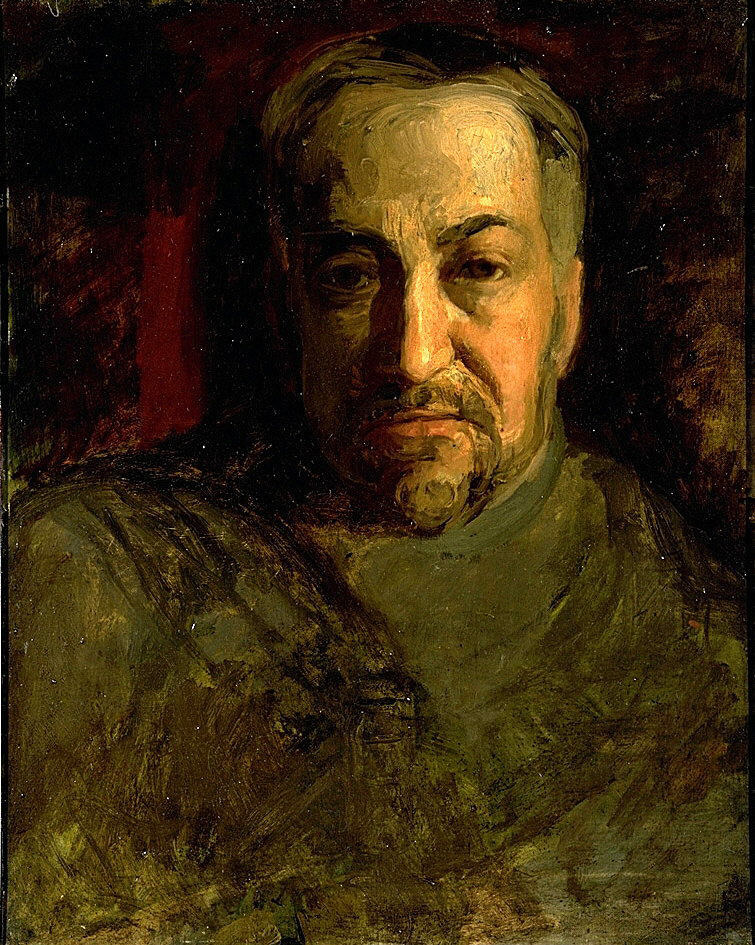
Thomas Eakins Self-portrait, c. 1902. Oil on canvas mounted on fibre board, 50.8 cm × 40.9 cm (20.0 in × 16.1 in) Hirshhorn Museum and Sculpture Garden.

It is possible that the smaller oil was intended as an anatomical study or an experiment in emotional tone that Eakins decided not to submit to the Academy. The small size, 20 by 16 inches (510 mm × 410 mm), was used by Eakins for only two other portraits. Of frontal format, it is more directly confrontational than the Academy's painting, and appears to have been left unfinished. The artist may have been wearing a gray sweater seen previously in an 1895 photograph. Eakins' student Charles Bregler recalled that the painting was made in one sitting.

== Painting ==
At 30 by 25 inches (760 mm × 640 mm), the Academy canvas is larger than Eakins' customary format of 24 by 20 inches (610 mm × 510 mm) for a bust portrait. He is seen in formal attire, wearing a dark suit with buttoned waistcoat, white shirt and a dark tie. His hair is unkempt and his mustache unevenly trimmed; the contrast between clothing and grooming alludes to a rebellious nature restrained by cultural mores. Compared to the smaller portrait, there is a greater sense of space and less intense physical immediacy— for John Updike, the National Academy picture "tames down a more truculent and even satanic earlier version"— though in both paintings Eakins makes direct eye contact with the viewer, a motive he very rarely used except for subjects with whom he was most familiar. Rarer still is such emphasis on the eye's liquid reflection, which accents the emotional impact of the image. The pose of the upper body is the same as that which Eakins used in Portrait of Leslie W. Miller, painted in 1901.

The painting is a fine example of Eakins' mature technique— "an unmatched demonstration of his absolute control of the medium"— and a powerful psychological study. Flesh and bone structure are painted with small strokes of fluid paint that offer a successful illusion of light-struck form, and at the same time the artist's self-depiction suggests emotional vulnerability. While presenting an expression that has been interpreted as one of "accusation and bitterness", art historian Darrel Sewell has noted that the painting's power resides in its emotional ambiguity, and that it bears closer relationship to the sympathetic intimacy of Eakins' portraits of women than to his more psychologically distant images of men.

== See also ==
- List of works by Thomas Eakins
