= John H. Brinton =

American surgeon

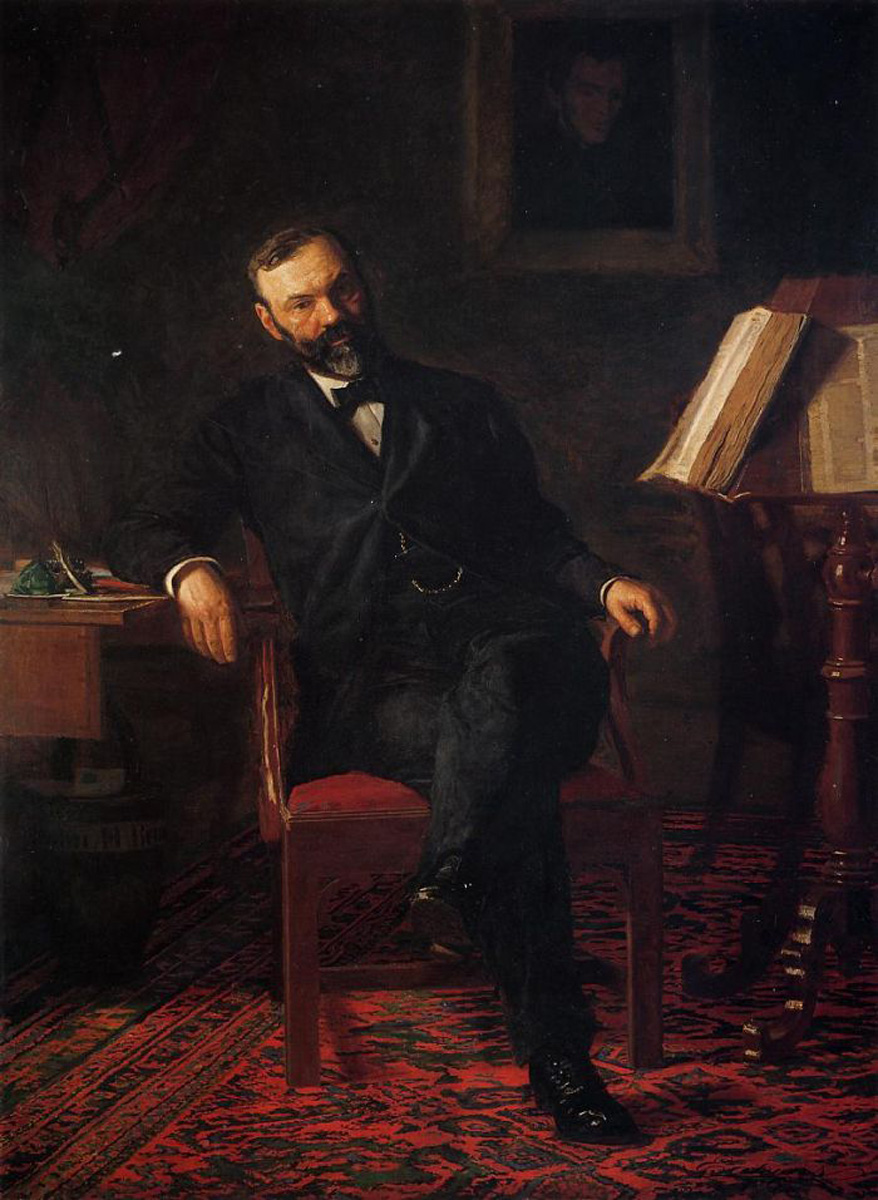
- Portrait of Dr. John H. Brinton by Thomas Eakins
- Born: May 21, 1832; Philadelphia, Pennsylvania
- Died: March 18, 1907 (aged 74); Philadelphia, Pennsylvania
- Scientific career
- Fields: Surgery

John Hill Brinton (May 21, 1832 – March 18, 1907) was an American surgeon.

Brinton was the first child of George and Mary Margaret (Smith) Brinton of Philadelphia, Pennsylvania. He graduated from the University of Pennsylvania in 1850, and from the Jefferson Medical College in 1852, finishing with an A.M. degree from the University of Pennsylvania in 1853 and an LL.D. in 1901. He commenced a general practice in Philadelphia in 1853.

He served in the capacity of a brigadier surgeon in the American Civil War, later as a member of General Ulysses S. Grant's staff.

Surgeon General William Alexander Hammond made him the first curator of the National Museum of Health and Medicine.

After the war, he returned to Philadelphia and resumed practice as a surgeon. In 1866, he married Sarah Ward (1837–1924) who also posed for Eakins), with whom he would father six children. Sarah was the older sister of Ferdinand Ward. Brinton was also friends of painter Thomas Eakins.

Brinton succeeded Dr. Samuel D. Gross (who was featured in Thomas Eakins' The Gross Clinic), in the chair of surgery at Jefferson College, and also served as the chairman of the Mütter Museum Committee of the College of Physicians of Philadelphia. He also founded the Philadelphia Pathological Society, and served as the first curator of the National Museum of Health and Medicine in Washington, D.C. In 1886, he was elected as a member to the American Philosophical Society.

Brinton died in 1907, and is buried in the cemetery at The Woodlands (Philadelphia, Pennsylvania).

== See also ==
- List of works by Thomas Eakins
