= The Artist's Wife and His Setter Dog =

Painting by Thomas Eakins

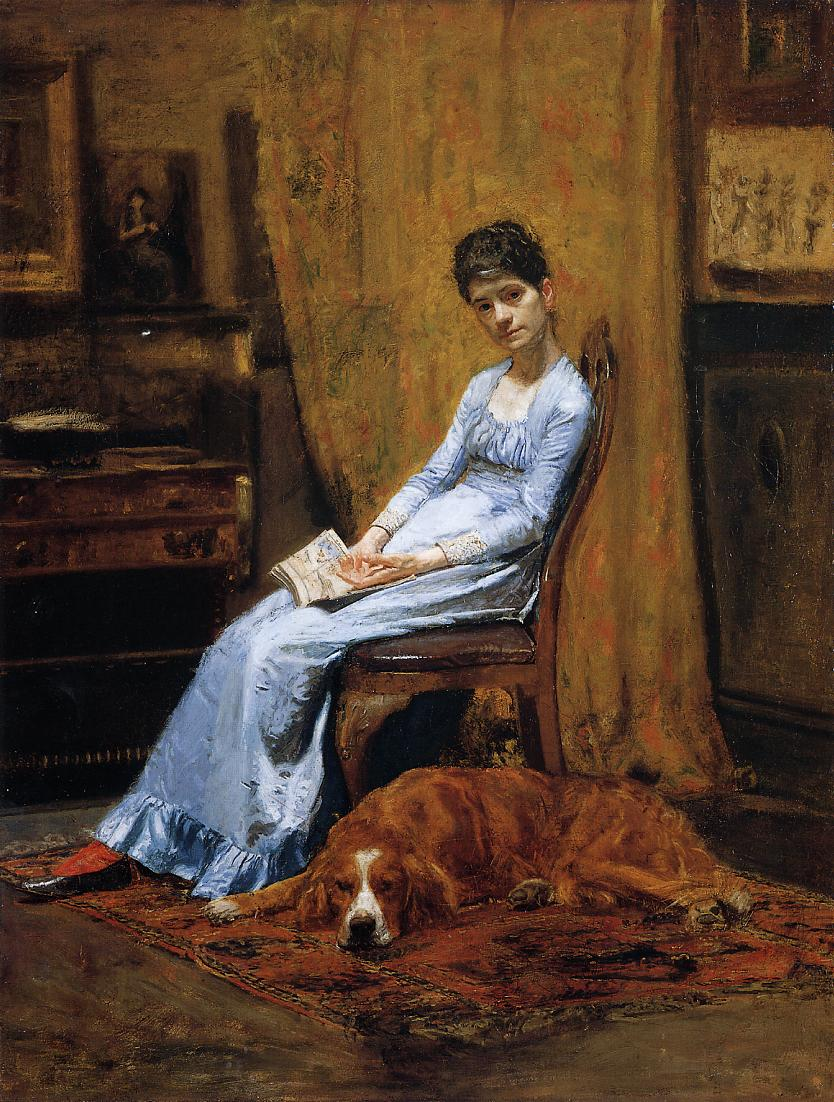
- Artist: Thomas Eakins
- Year: c. 1884–1889
- Medium: Oil on canvas
- Dimensions: 76.2 cm × 58.4 cm (30.0 in × 23.0 in)
- Location: Metropolitan Museum of Art, New York

The Artist's Wife and His Setter Dog is a painting by the American painter Thomas Eakins, from c. 1884–1889. It is part of the collection of the Metropolitan Museum of Art, in New York.

== History and description ==
Eakins began this portrait shortly after his marriage to his former student, the painter and photographer Susan Macdowell Eakins (1851–1938), in January 1884. The setting is his studio at 1330 Chestnut Street in Philadelphia, where the couple and their dog Harry lived from 1884 to 1886.

The painting depicts Susan Macdowell Eakins in a blue dress, seated in a chair in her living room, while reading a book. She takes a pause and looks at the viewer. At her side, the dog rests peacefully on the floor.

== See also ==
- List of works by Thomas Eakins
