= Biglin brothers =

American rowing brothers

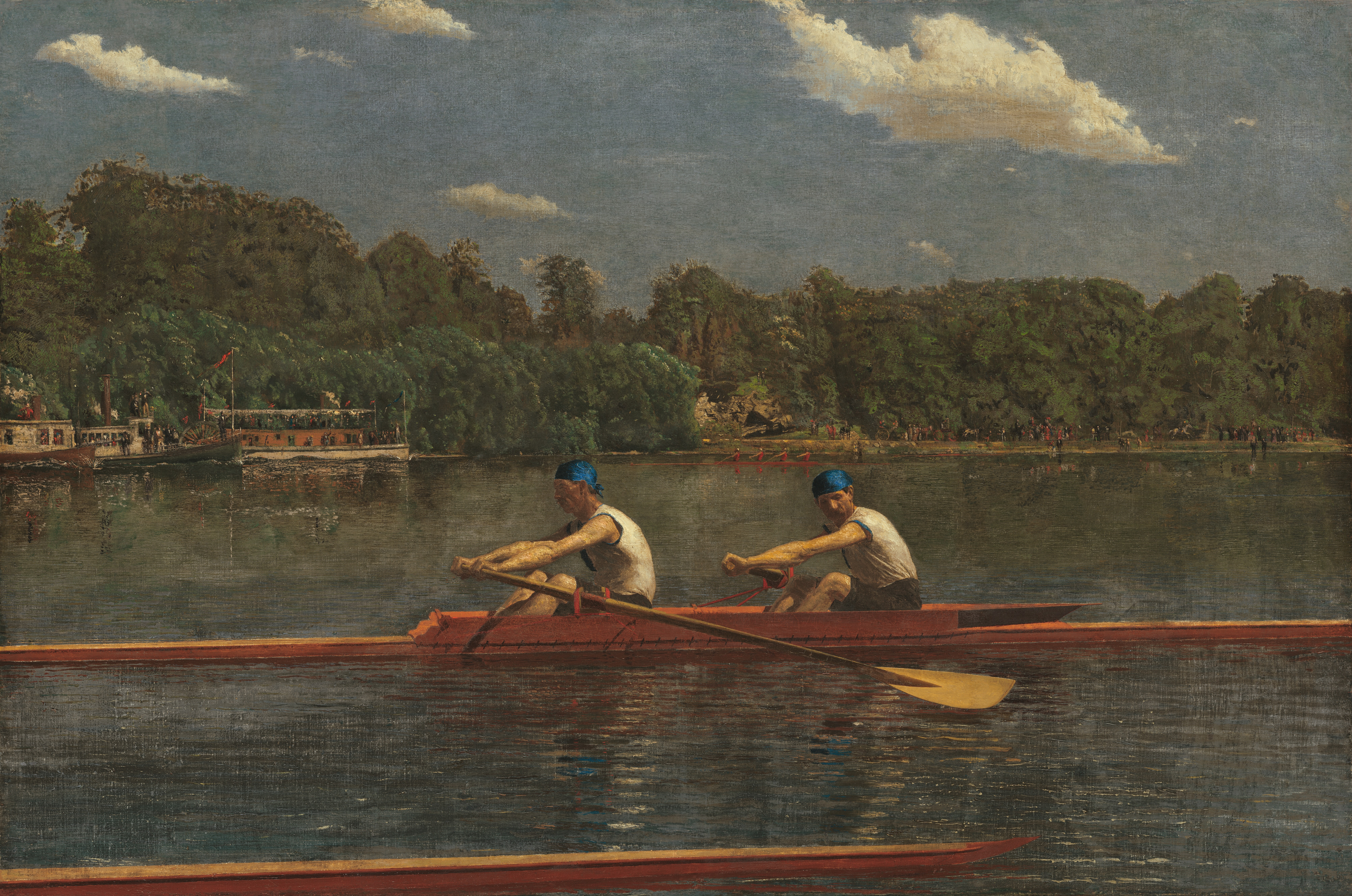
The Biglin Brothers Racing, Eakins, 1872

The Biglin Brothers: John (died April 19, 1886), James (1851–1917), and Bernard ["Barney"] (1840–1924) were brothers from New York active in professional rowing during the decade following the American Civil War, when rowing was one of America's most popular spectator sports. John and Barney were the subject of a series of eleven paintings by Thomas Eakins.

== Famous races ==
=== Poughkeepsie—1865 ===
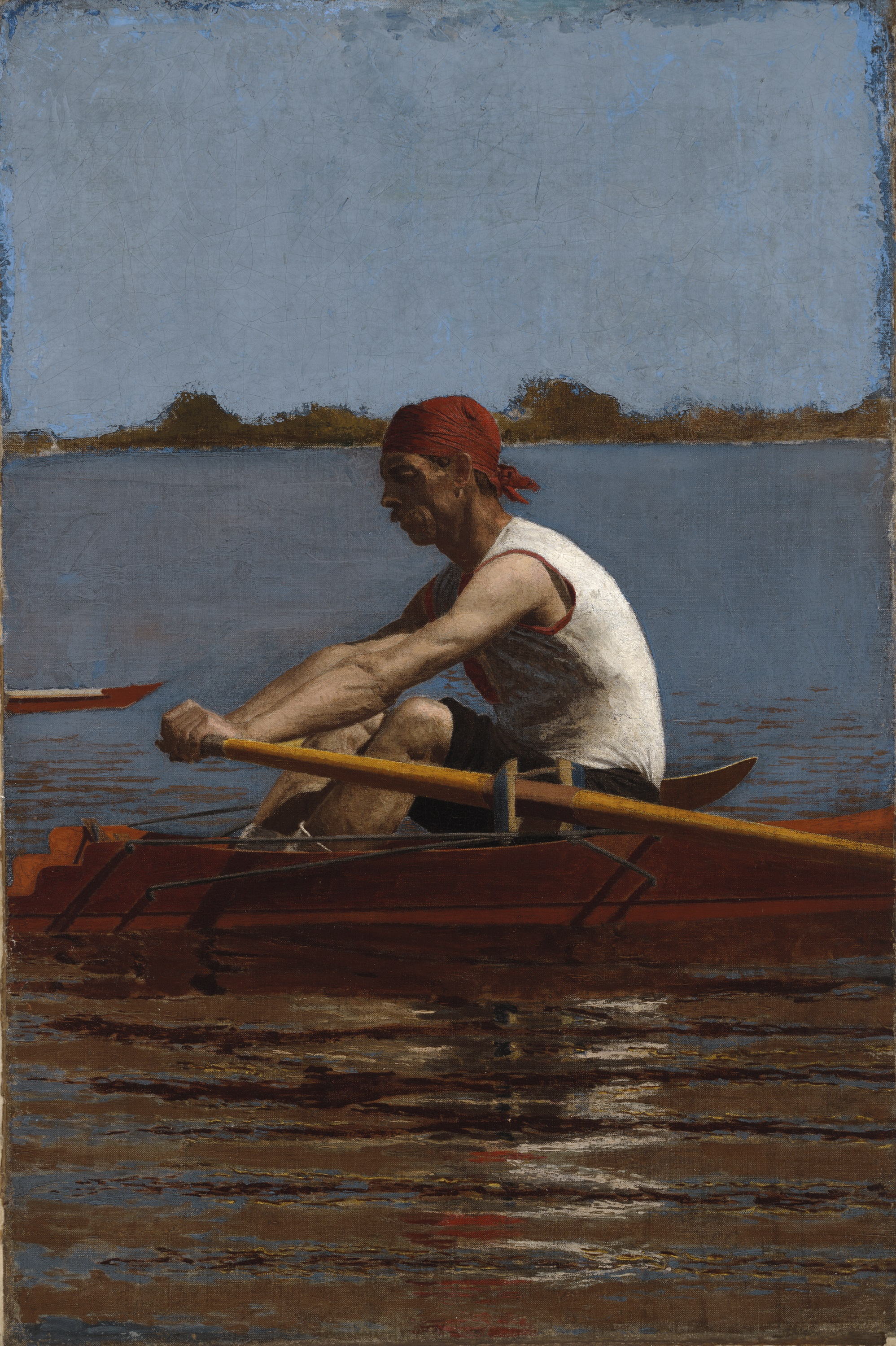
John Biglin in a Single Scull, Eakins, 1874

In July 1865 the American Championships took place in Poughkeepsie, New York. A crowd of more than 20,000 lined the riverbanks, and more than 10,000 people wagered an estimated $100,000 on the race. The trouble started when the Biglin Brothers’ four man team (consisting of the brothers and Dennis Leary) defeated a local crew consisting of William Stevens, Homer Wooden, William Burger, and Ezekiel Beneway. The losing boat protested that it was cut off at the finish. The referee and judges were rushed to the Poughkeepsie Hotel to rule on the race. The officials gave the race to the Biglin Brothers, and barely escaped with their lives. Because of the results the city descended into a riot as fights broke out between supporters of the rival crews. Detectives from New York City brought in to keep the peace had little impact.

=== Ward v Biglin—1865 ===
The Biglin Brothers were quickly challenged to a race on a five-mile course at Sing Sing by Josh Ward, who had organized a four-man team from his brothers, Gil, Charles, and Hank.

On September 25, the Ward brothers beat the Biglin brothers for the professional four-oared championship of America.

=== Schuylkill River—1872 ===
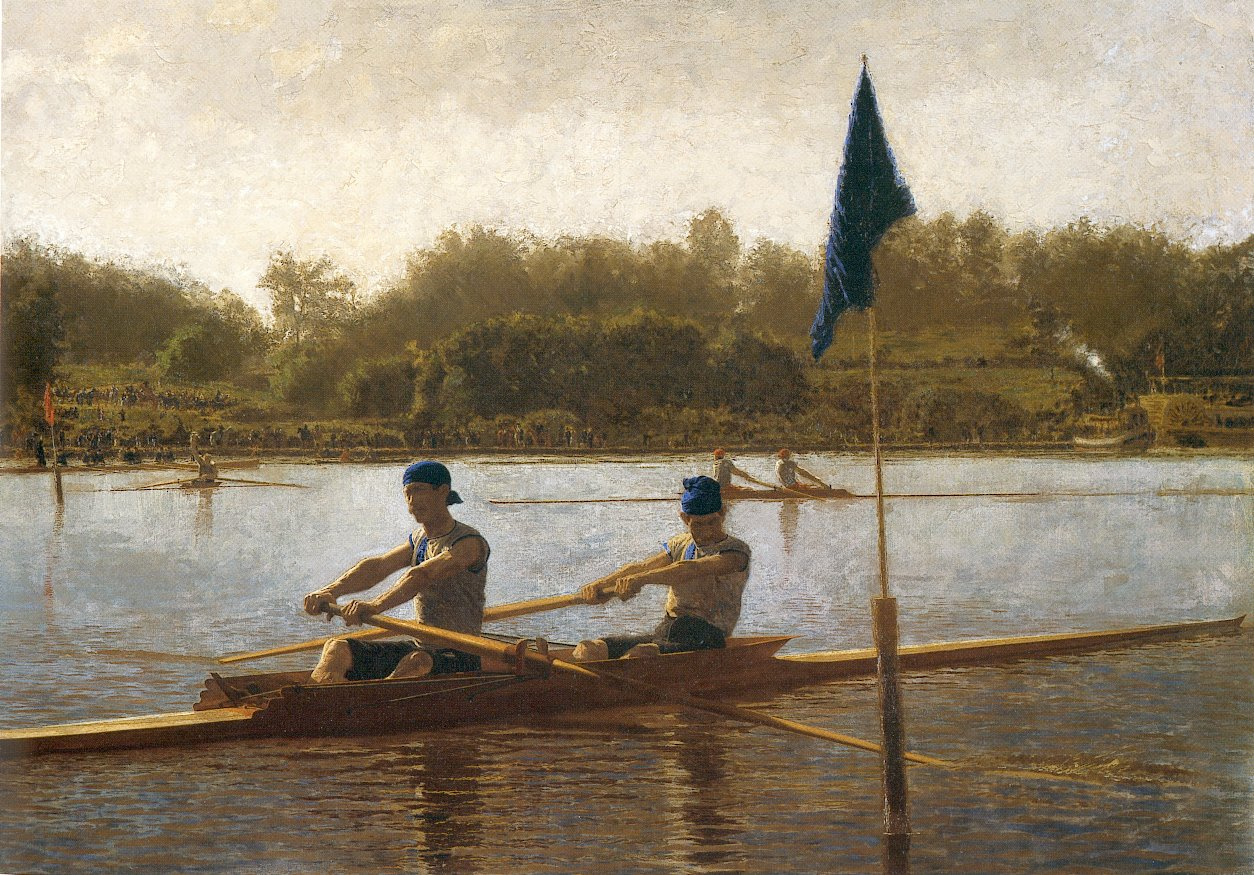
The Biglin Brothers Turning the Stake-Boat, Eakins

In 1872, John and Barney challenged any English rowing pair to a race. No English team stepped forward, but a team from Pittsburgh, Pennsylvania, of Henry Coulter and Lewis Cavitt accepted the challenge. The five-mile Schuylkill River course started at the Columbia Bridge and went to the Girard Avenue Bridge and back. One of Thomas Eakins' many paintings of the brothers, "The Biglin Brothers Turning the Stake-Boat", depicts the midpoint of the race. The brothers won by one minute and were proclaimed world champions. The race was covered by numerous newspapers and magazines, including The New York Times and brought the brothers considerable fame.

== Political career ==
Barney Biglin was a member of the New York State Assembly (New York Co., 18th D.) in 1873 and 1874.
