= The Pianist (painting) =

Painting by Thomas Eakins

- The Pianist: Portrait of Stanley Addicks
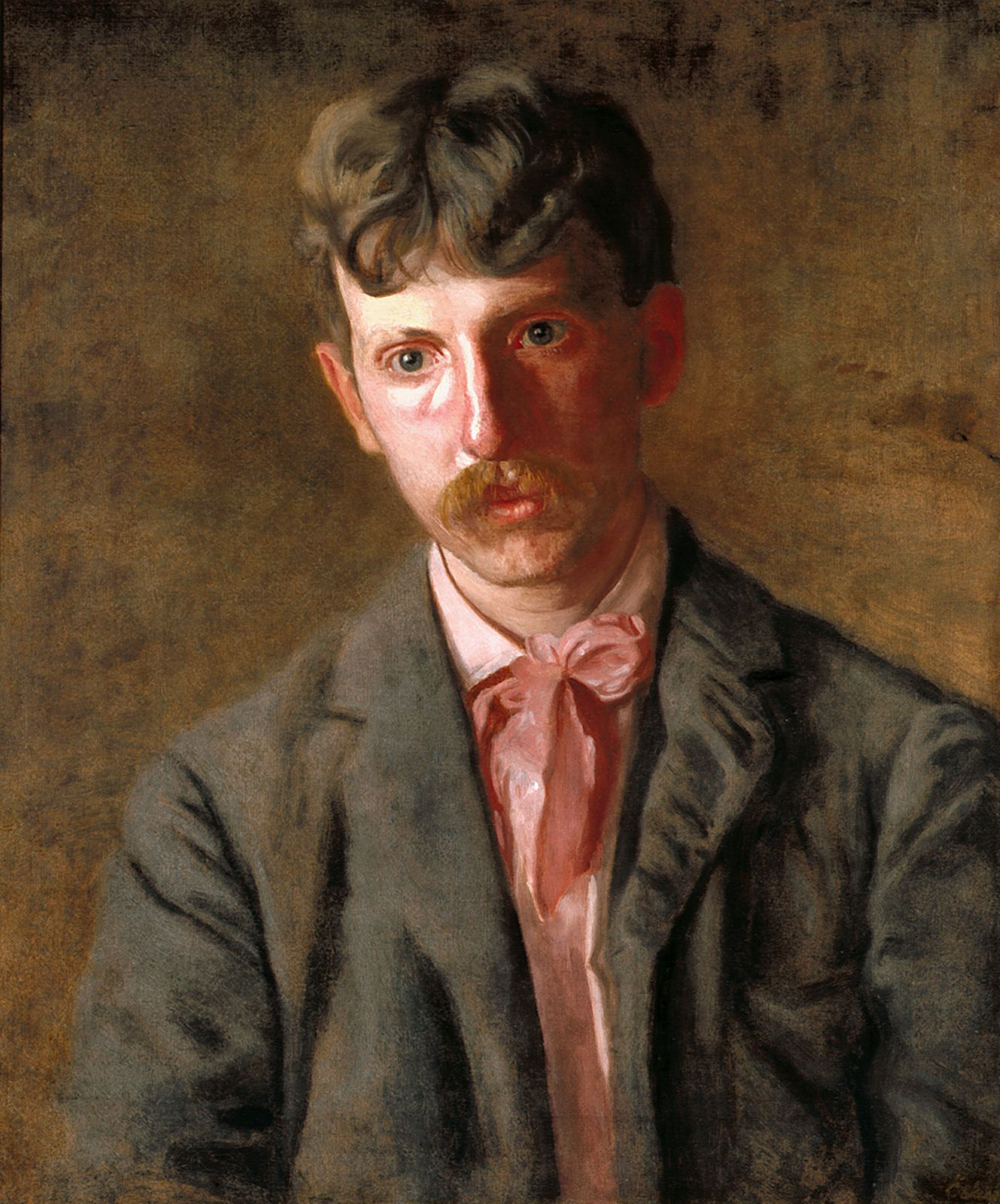
- Year: 1896
- Medium: oil paint, canvas
- Dimensions: 23.5 in (60 cm) × 19.75 in (50.2 cm)
- Location: Indianapolis Museum of Art

The Pianist: Portrait of Stanley Addicks is an 1896 oil-on-canvas portrait by the American painter Thomas Eakins. In the catolgue of Eakins's work it is numbered Goodrich #278. The painting is in the permanent collection of the Indianapolis Museum of Art.

Eakins also painted Addicks's wife, Weda Cook, several times, including for The Concert Singer.

== See also ==
- List of works by Thomas Eakins
