= The Writing Master =

Painting by Thomas Eakins

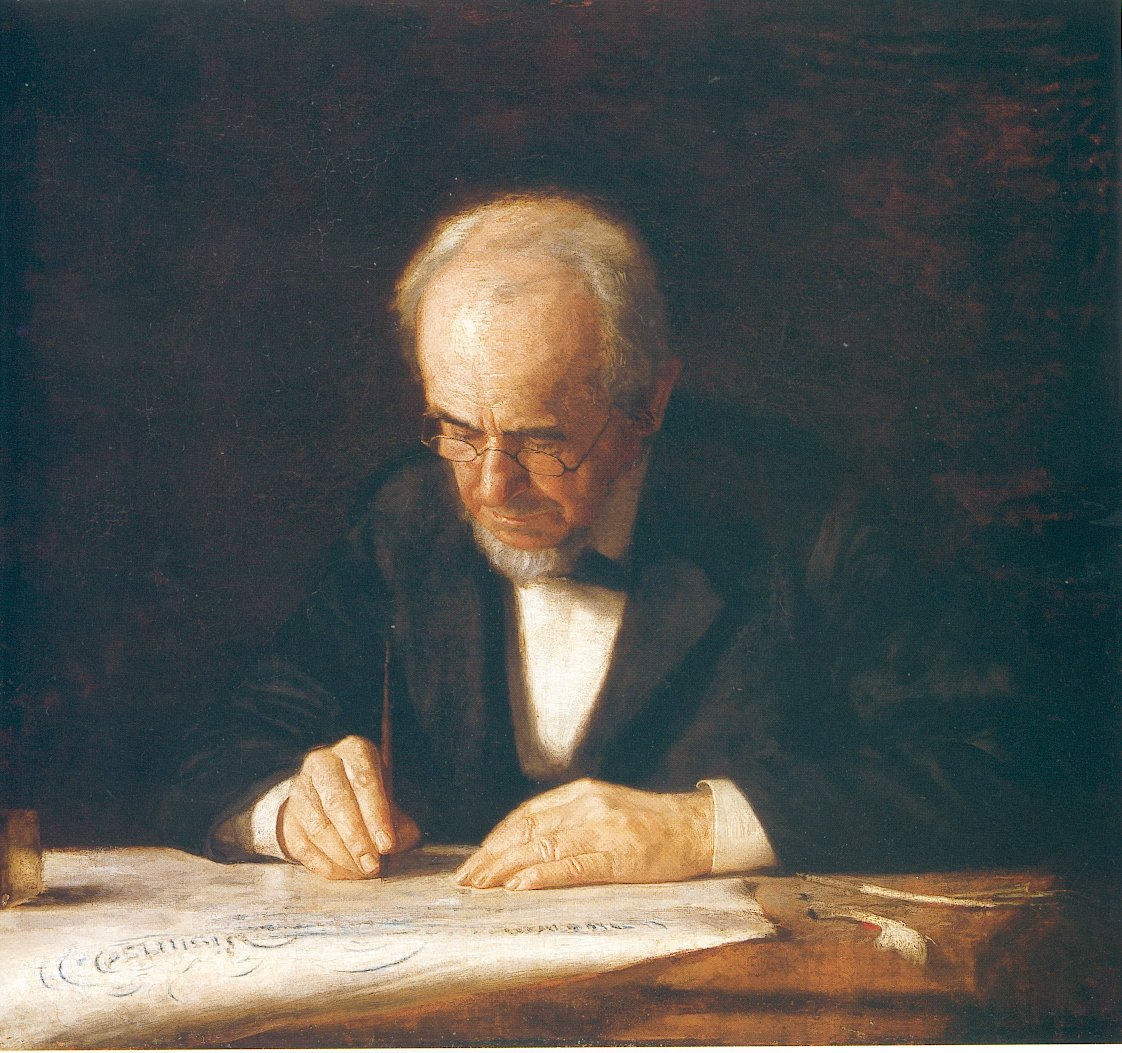
- The painting
- Artist: Thomas Eakins
- Year: 1882
- Medium: Oil on canvas
- Dimensions: 76.2 cm × 87 cm (30.0 in × 34 in)
- Location: Metropolitan Museum of Art, New York
- Accession: 17.173

The Writing Master is an oil painting on canvas executed in 1882 by the American painter Thomas Eakins. It is part of the collection of the Metropolitan Museum of Art, in New York.

The subject of the painting is Eakin's father, the calligraphist Benjamin Eakins. He is seen seated at a desk, in a dark room, fully absorbed in his writing.

The work is on view in the Metropolitan Museum's Gallery 764

== See also ==
- List of works by Thomas Eakins
- 1882 in art
