= Between Rounds =

Painting by Thomas Eakins

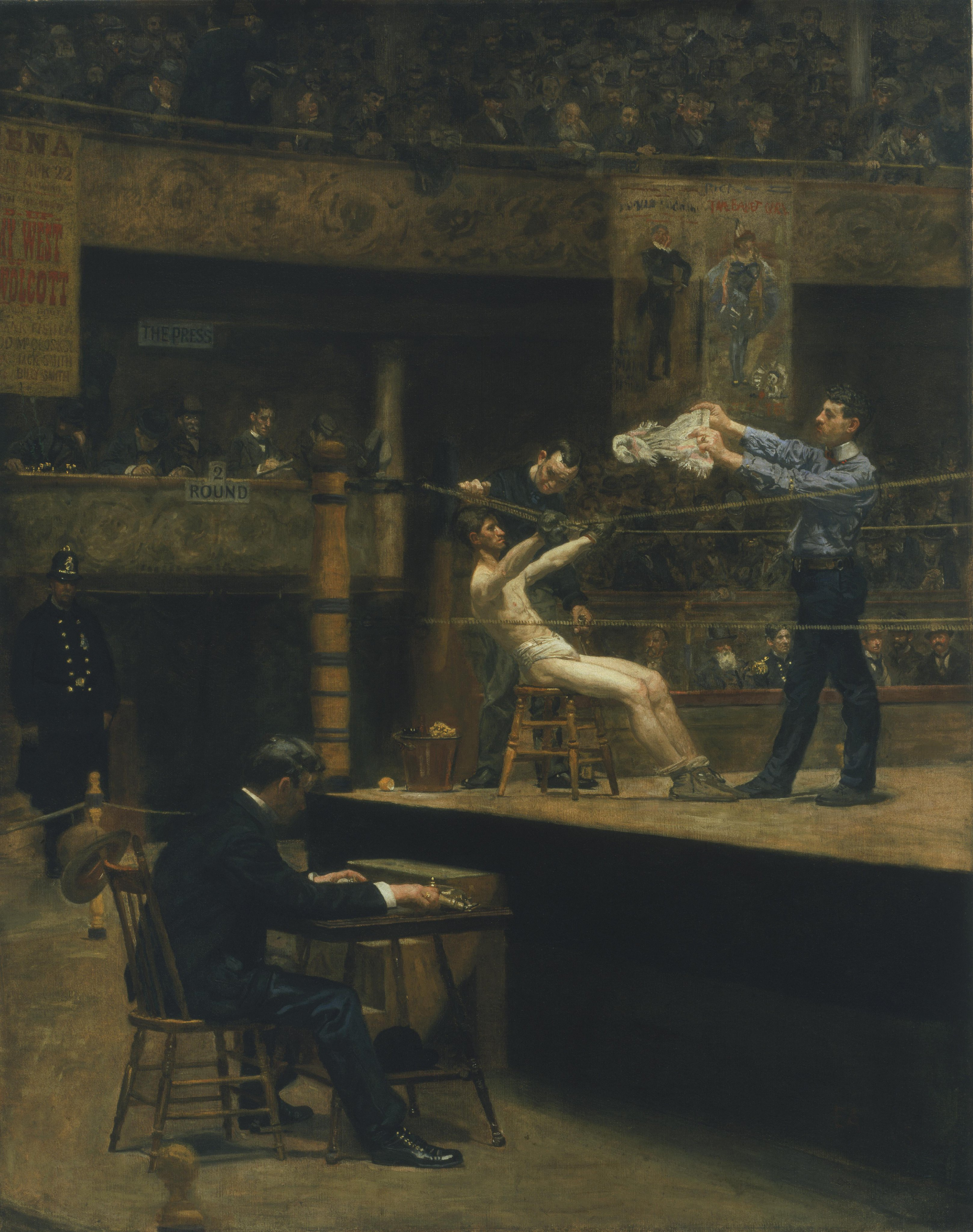
- Year: 1899
- Medium: Oil on canvas
- Dimensions: 50 1/8 x 39 7/8 in (127.3 x 101.3 cm)
- Location: Philadelphia Museum of Art, Philadelphia

Between Rounds is an 1899 painting by American artist Thomas Eakins, Goodrich #312. It is part of the collection of the Philadelphia Museum of Art It depicts a boxer resting in his corner during a boxing match.

== Studies ==
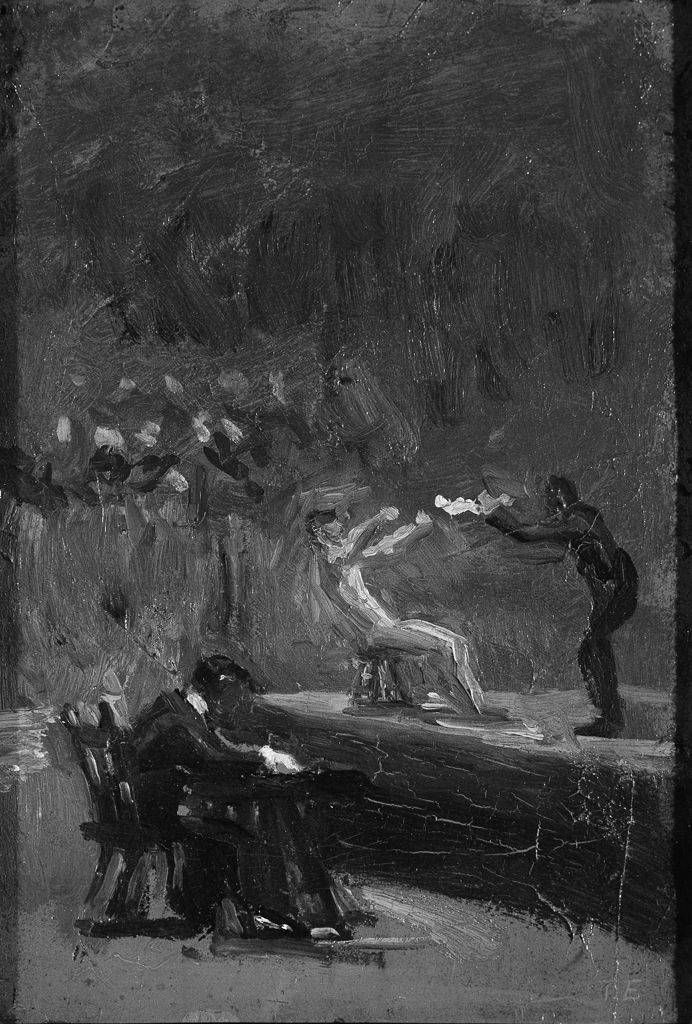
G-313. Sketch for Between Rounds, Hirshhorn Museum and Sculpture Garden

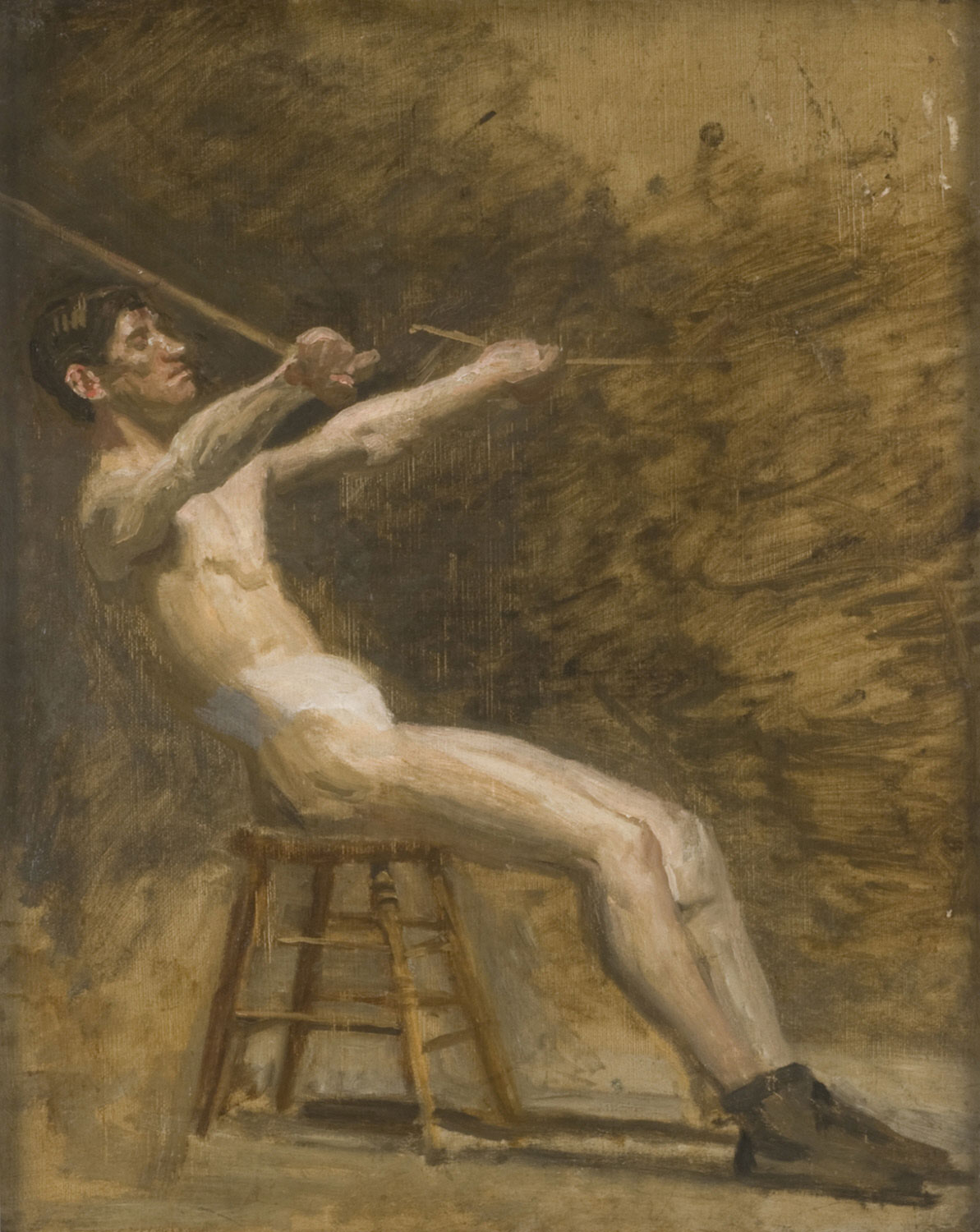
G-314. Sketch of Billy Smith, Philadelphia Museum of Art

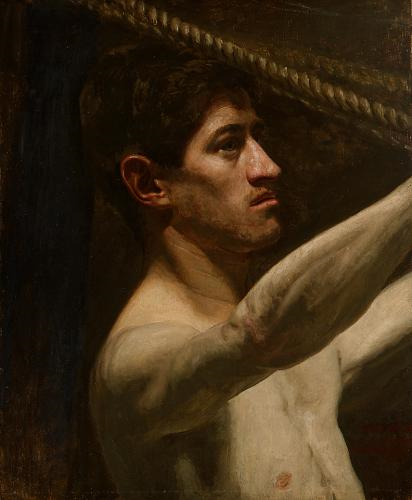
G-315. Study of Billy Smith, Wichita Art Museum

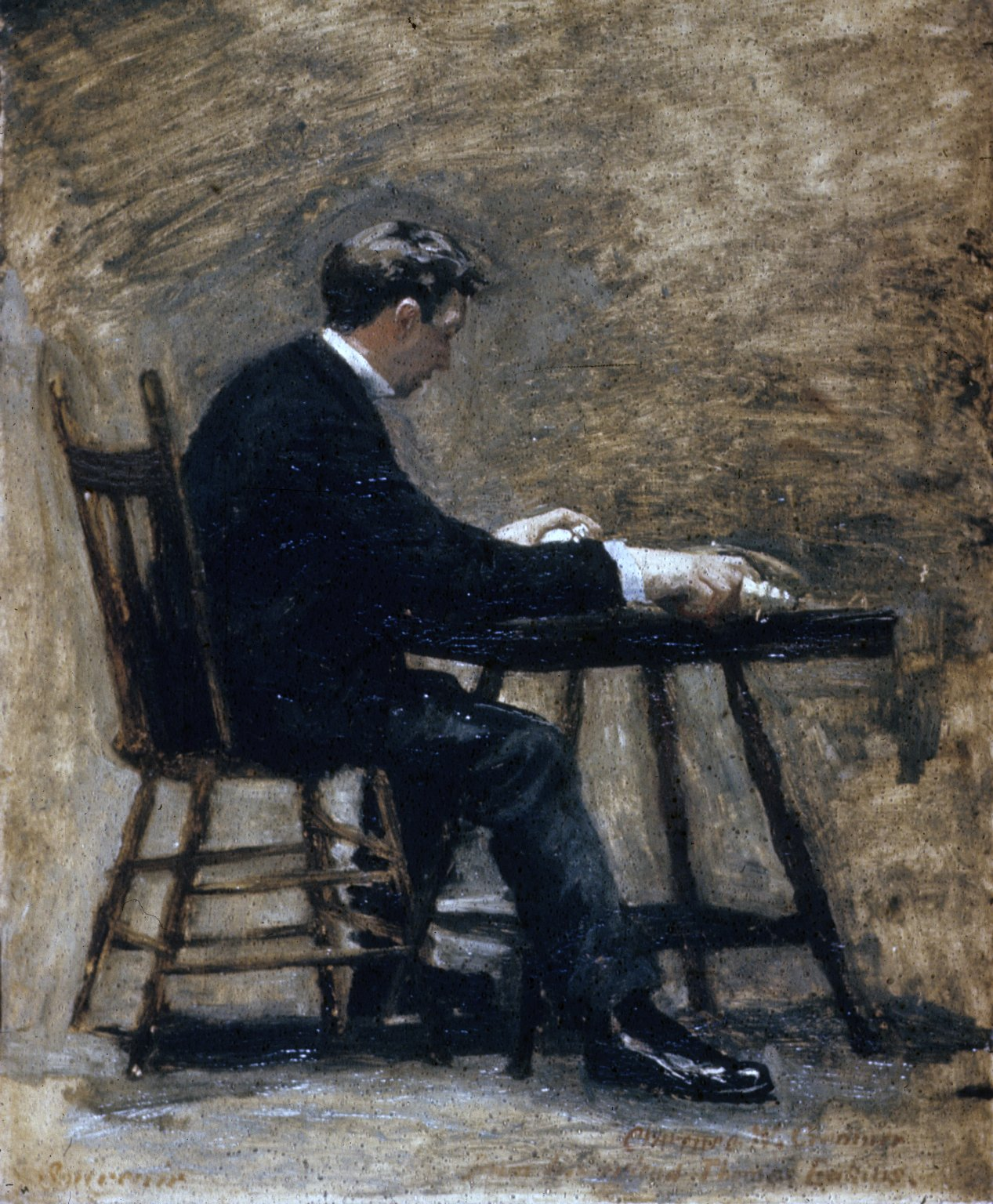
G-316. The Timer, New Britain Museum of American Art

== See also ==
- List of works by Thomas Eakins
- 1899 in art
