= Henry Coulter =

Rugby union player from Northern Ireland

- Full name: Henry Herbert Coulter
- Born: 3 December 1898 Glastry, County Down, Ireland
- Died: 13 July 1965 (aged 66) Bristol, England
- School: Methodist College Belfast
- University: Queen's University Belfast

Rugby union career
- Position: Hooker
International career
Years	Team	Apps	(Points)
1920	Ireland	3	(0)

Henry Herbert Coulter (3 December 1898 — 13 July 1965) was an Irish international rugby union player.

The son of a Methodist minister, Coulter was born in Glastry, County Down, and attended Methodist College Belfast.

Coulter played on the varsity team at Queen's University during his medical studies and was capped three times as a hooker for Ireland, against England, Scotland and Wales in the 1920 Five Nations Championship.

Moving to England, Coulter practised medicine in Bristol for the last 27 years of his medical career.

== See also ==
- List of Ireland national rugby union players
