= Church of the Ascension, Episcopal (Manhattan) =

Church in Manhattan, New York

- Church of the Ascension (Episcopal)
- U.S. National Register of Historic Places
- U.S. National Historic Landmark
- U.S. Historic district – Contributing property
- New York State Register of Historic Places
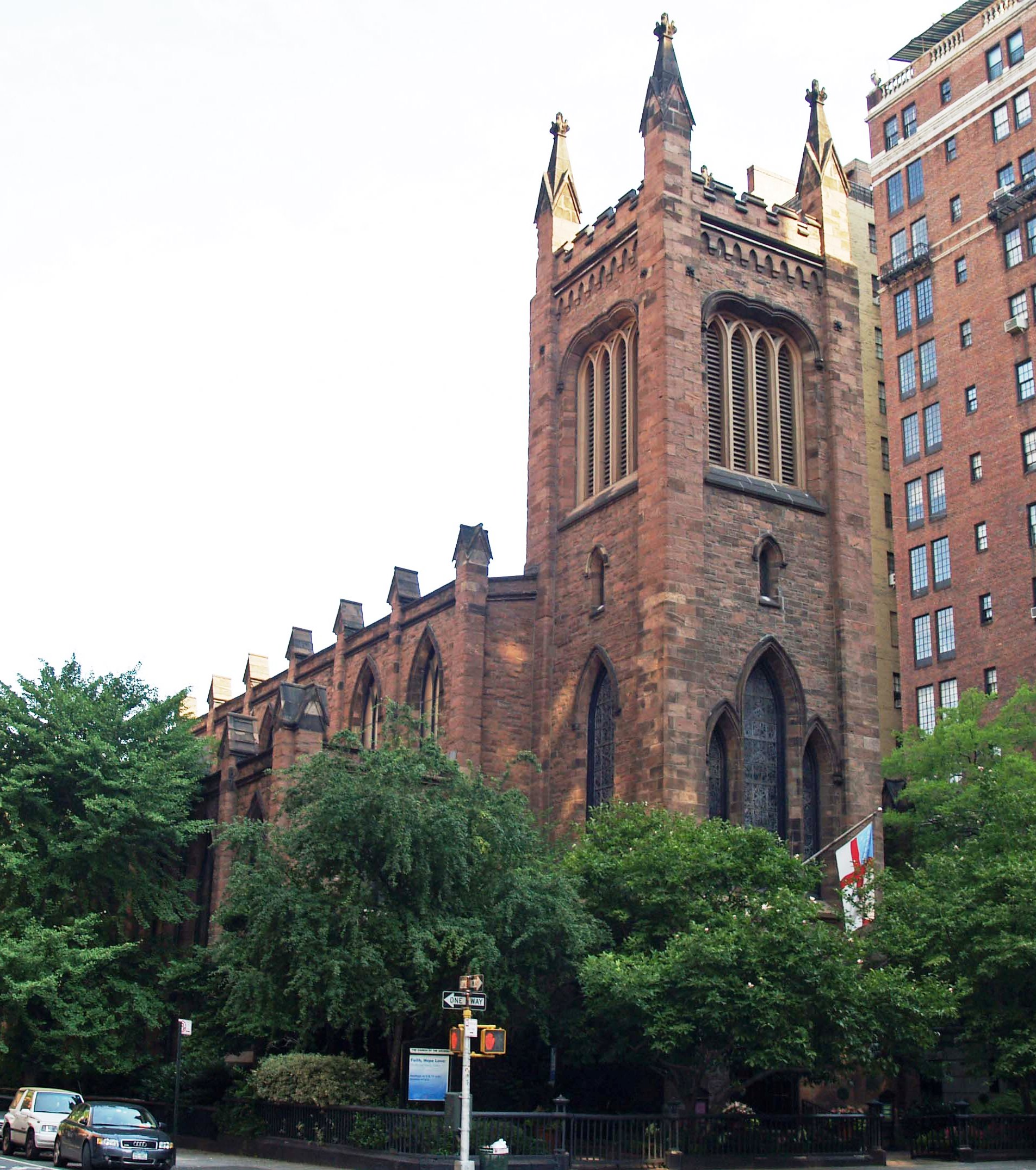
- (2007)

- Location within Manhattan Location within New York City Location within New York Location within the United States
- Location: 36–38 Fifth Avenue, Manhattan, New York City
- Coordinates: 40°44′01″N 73°59′44″W
- Built: Church: 1840–41; Parish House: 1888–89
- Architect: Church: Richard Upjohn; Parish House: McKim, Mead & White
- Architectural style: church: Gothic Revival parish house: Northern Renaissance
- Part of: Greenwich Village Historic District (ID79001604)
- NRHP reference No.: 87002593
- NYSRHP No.: 06101.001681

Significant dates
- Added to NRHP: December 23, 1987
- Designated NHL: December 23, 1987
- Designated NYSRHP: June 23, 1980

The Church of the Ascension is an Episcopal church in the Diocese of New York, located at 36–38 Fifth Avenue and West 10th Street in the Greenwich Village neighborhood of Manhattan New York City. It was built in 1840–41, the first church to be built on Fifth Avenue and was designed by Richard Upjohn in the Gothic Revival style. The interior was remodeled by Stanford White in 1885–88.

The church's parish house, at 12 West 11th Street between Fifth Avenue and the Avenue of the Americas (Sixth Avenue), was originally built in 1844 as a residence, and was altered to its current state in 1888–89 by McKim, Mead and White in a Northern Renaissance-inspired style.

The church became a National Historic Landmark in 1987.

Both the church and parish house are part of the Greenwich Village Historic District, designated by the New York City Landmarks Preservation Commission in 1969.

== Parish history ==
The Church of the Ascension was first organized in 1827, and their first church – located on the north side of Canal Street east of Broadway – was one of the early Greek Revival buildings in the city, designed by the city's first professional architectural firm, Town & Thompson, the partnership of Ithiel Town and Martin Euclid Thompson. Built in 1828–29, the church burned down in 1839, prompting the move to the parish's current location and church. Until the new church was completed, the parish met in a number of places for two years.

Not long after the church opened, on June 26, 1844, United States President John Tyler married Julia Gardiner. Since Gardiner was much younger than Tyler, John Quincy Adams called the couple the "laughing-stock of the city."

In 1865, under then-rector James Cotton Smith, the parish began a mission church – originally the Chapel of the Shepherd's Flock, later the Ascension Memorial Chapel – at 249 West 43rd Street, building a sanctuary there in 1895. This acquired the nickname of "The Little Brick Church in Times Square".

In response to the Wall Street Crash of 1929, the rector Donald Bradshaw Aldrich opened the doors of the church 24-hours a day for prayer and meditation, earning the church the name "The Church of the Open Door". This policy was in effect for decades: about 30,000 people visited the church in the 1960s. Although the doors are not still open around the clock, the stained-glass windows are illuminated at night.

The church reported 189 members in 2016 and 219 members in 2025. Plate and pledge income reported for the congregation in 2025 was $456,826 with average Sunday attendance (ASA) of 76 persons.

== Buildings ==
Richard Upjohn's design for the church is "closely related" to his designs for Trinity Church in Manhattan, which began construction slightly earlier, in 1839, and Christ Church in Brooklyn, which came afterwards. The brownstone church is symmetrical, and features a square tower.

Stanford White's interior design was "one of the great collaborative efforts of the era", and features a pulpit designed by Charles Follen McKim; mosaics by D. Maitland Armstrong; a marble reredos by Louis Saint-Gaudens, the brother of Augustus Saint-Gaudens; several stained glass windows by John Humphreys Johnston and John LaFarge, including the later's altar mural The Ascension, a 30-foot (9.1 m) by 35-foot (11 m) piece considered to be one of his best works

The parish house designed by McKim, Mead and White took a previously existing building and turned it into a Northern Renaissance-inspired building of yellow brick with bottle-glass windows.

== Organ ==
The church has had a series of organs since its construction in 1840–41. The current organ is The Manton Memorial Organ which was dedicated on May 1, 2011. The organ was built by Pascal Quoirin of St. Didier in Provence, France. It is the first organ built in France to be installed in New York City and replaced a Holtkamp Organ Company instrument built in 1966.

== Gallery ==
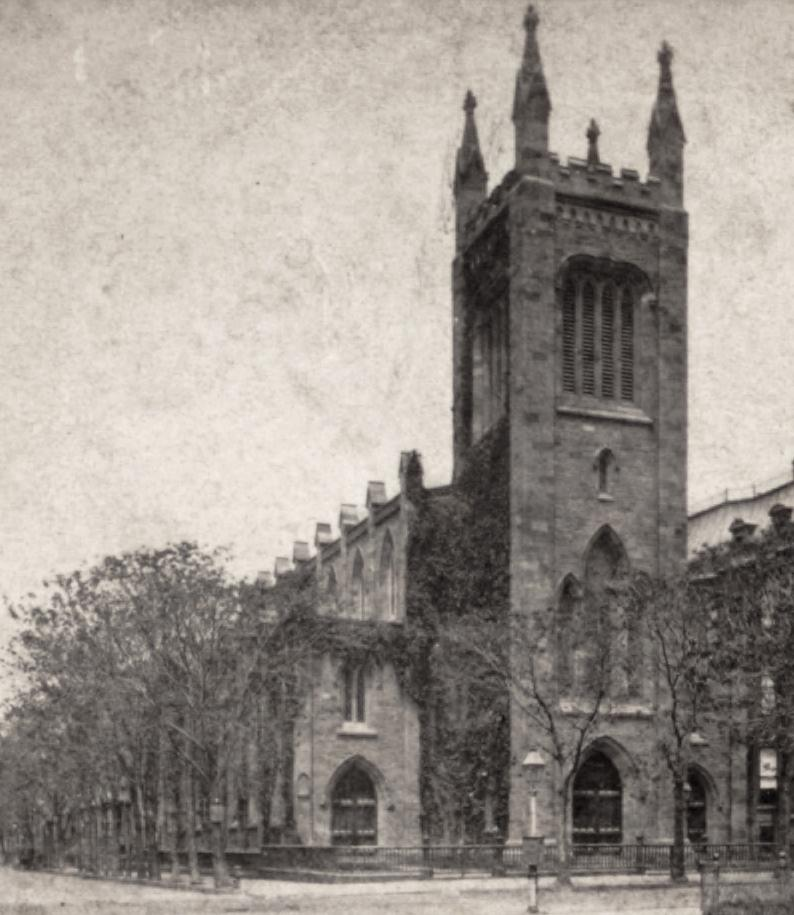
A late 19th century photograph of the church

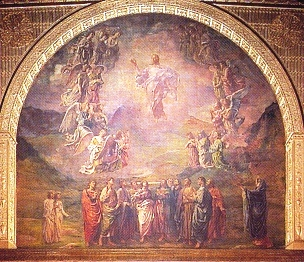
The Ascension by John LaFarge (1835-1910)

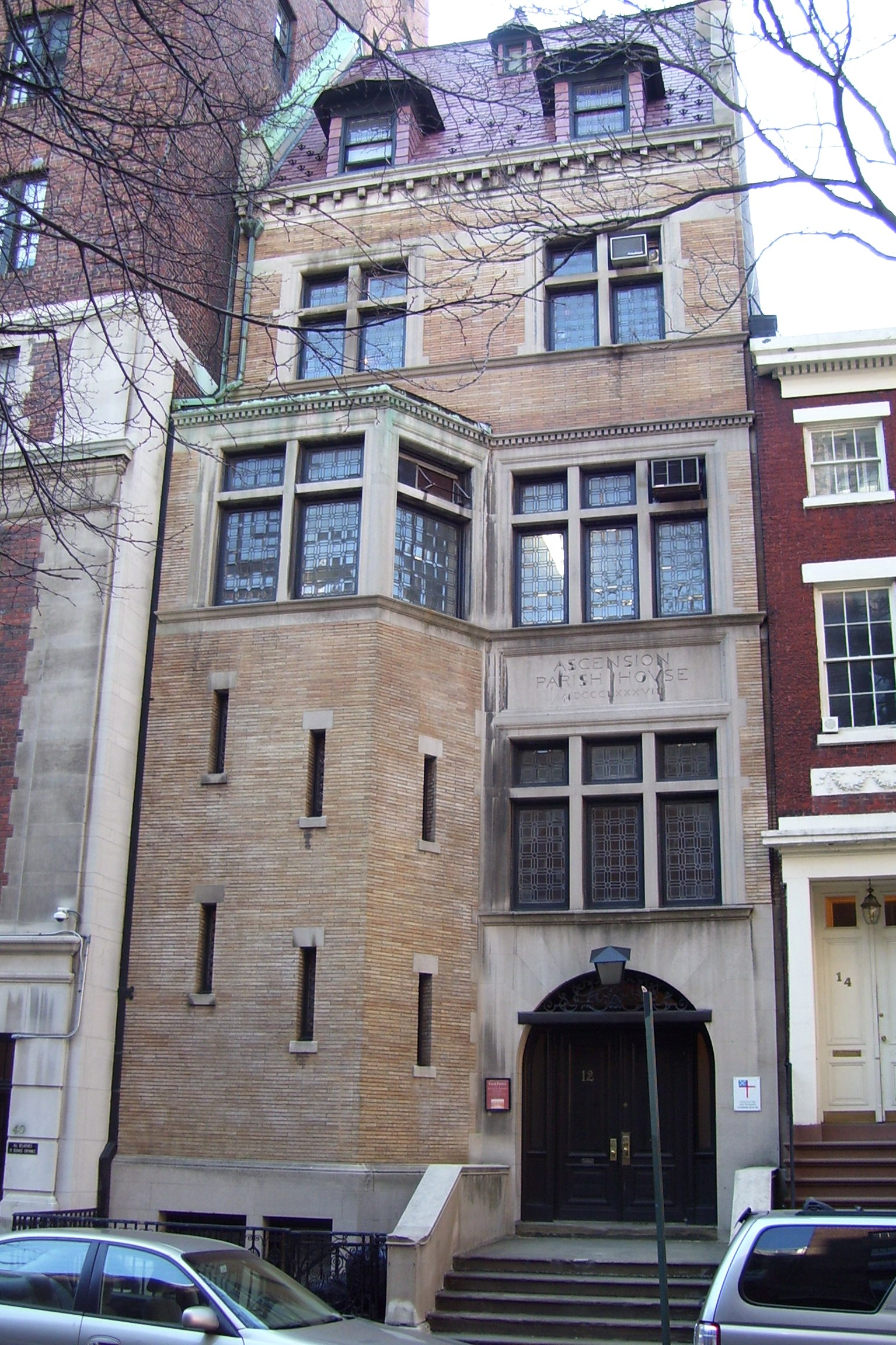
Parish House (1843–44), altered in 1888-89 by McKim, Mead & White

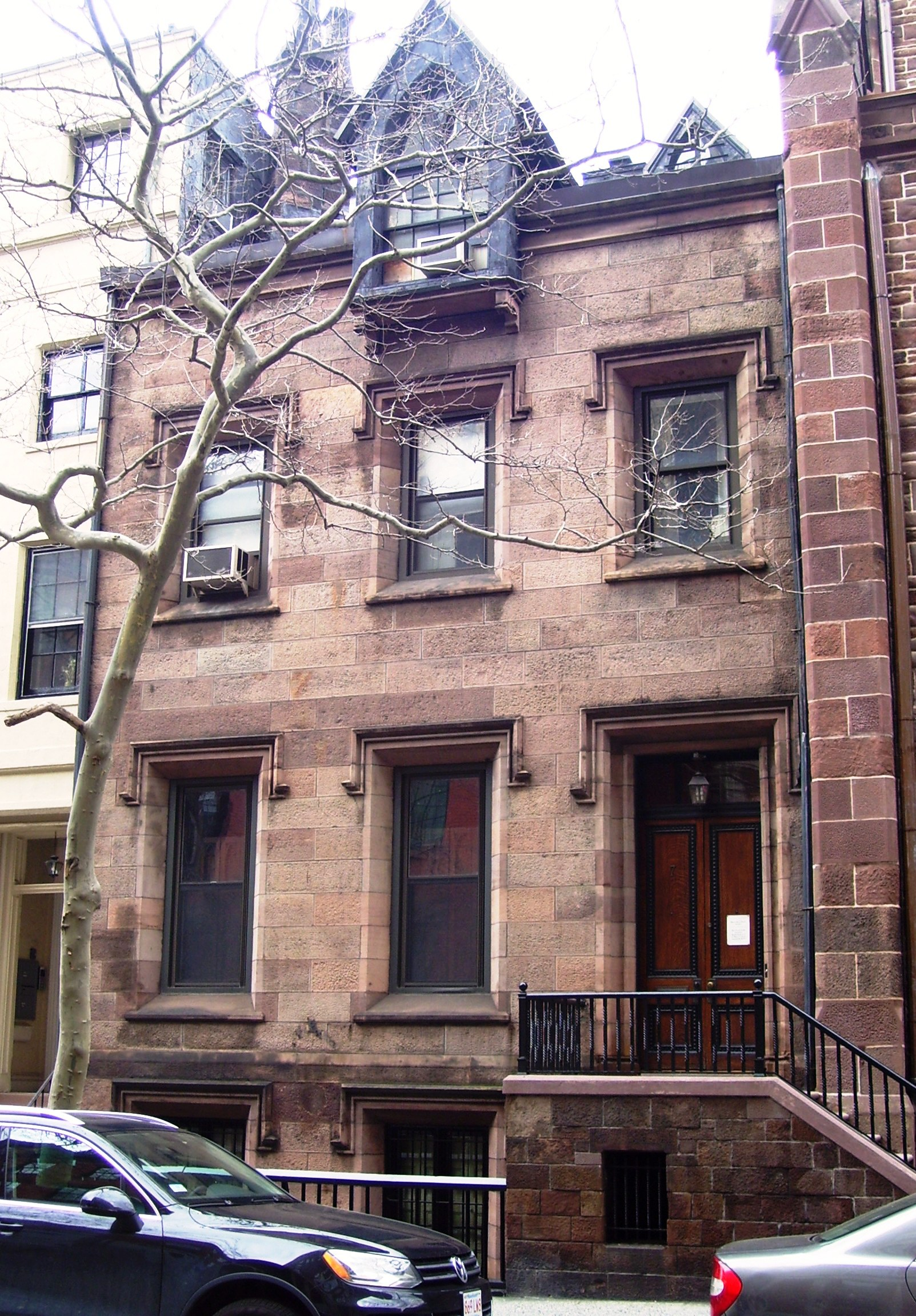
Rectory (1839–41)

== See also ==
- National Register of Historic Places listings in Manhattan below 14th Street
- List of National Historic Landmarks in New York City
