= George W. Maynard =

American painter

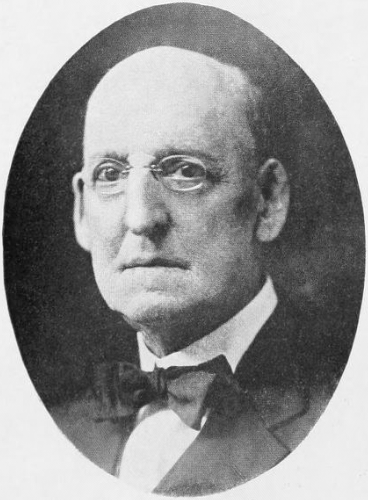
- Born: George Willoughby Maynard; March 5, 1843; Washington, D.C., US
- Died: April 5, 1923 (aged 80); New York, New York, US
- Education: National Academy of Design, Royal Academy of Fine Arts (Antwerp)
- Occupation: Artist

George Willoughby Maynard (March 5, 1843 – April 5, 1923) was an American painter, illustrator and muralist.

== Biography ==
George W. Maynard was born in Washington, D.C. He studied at the National Academy of Design in New York City, and the Royal Academy in Antwerp, Belgium.

His best-known works are the murals inside the old Metropolitan Opera House, New York (demolished 1967); the frieze in the Appellate Court House, New York; and his mural panels at the Library of Congress.

He was elected an associate of the National Academy of Design in 1885, and served as its librarian. He was also an honorary artist member of the Salmagundi Club New York from 1886 until his death and served as its President from 1888 to 1889.

He died in New York on April 5, 1923.

=== Paintings ===
- '76 (Soldier of the Revolution) (1876). Exhibited at the 1876 Centennial Exposition. Cover: Harper's Weekly, July 15, 1876.
- Portrait of Francis Davis Millet, Dressed as a War Correspondent (1878), National Portrait Gallery, Smithsonian. 1884 Temple Gold Medal: Pennsylvania Academy of the Fine Arts.
- Sappho (1888), Pennsylvania Academy of the Fine Arts.
- In Strange Seas (1889), Metropolitan Museum of Art.

=== Murals ===
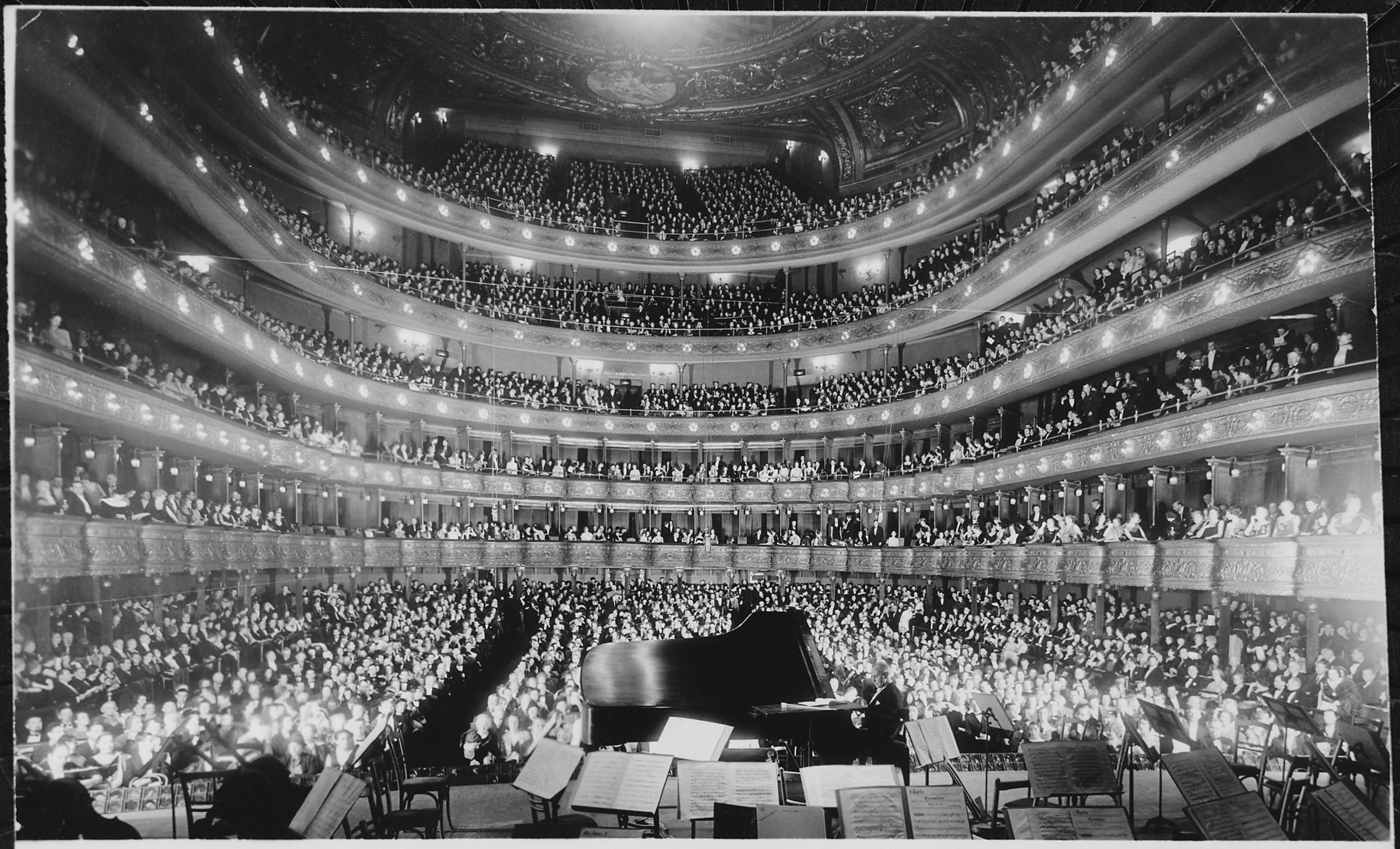
Old Metropolitan Opera House, New York City (demolished 1967)

- Moses and King David, St. John's Church, Jamaica Plain, Boston, Massachusetts
- Library of Congress
  - Adventure
  - Discovery
  - Conquest
  - Civilization
  - Justice
  - Courage
  - Fortitude
  - Patriotism
  - Ceiling disc mural: Courage - Valor - Fortitude - Achievement

== Gallery ==
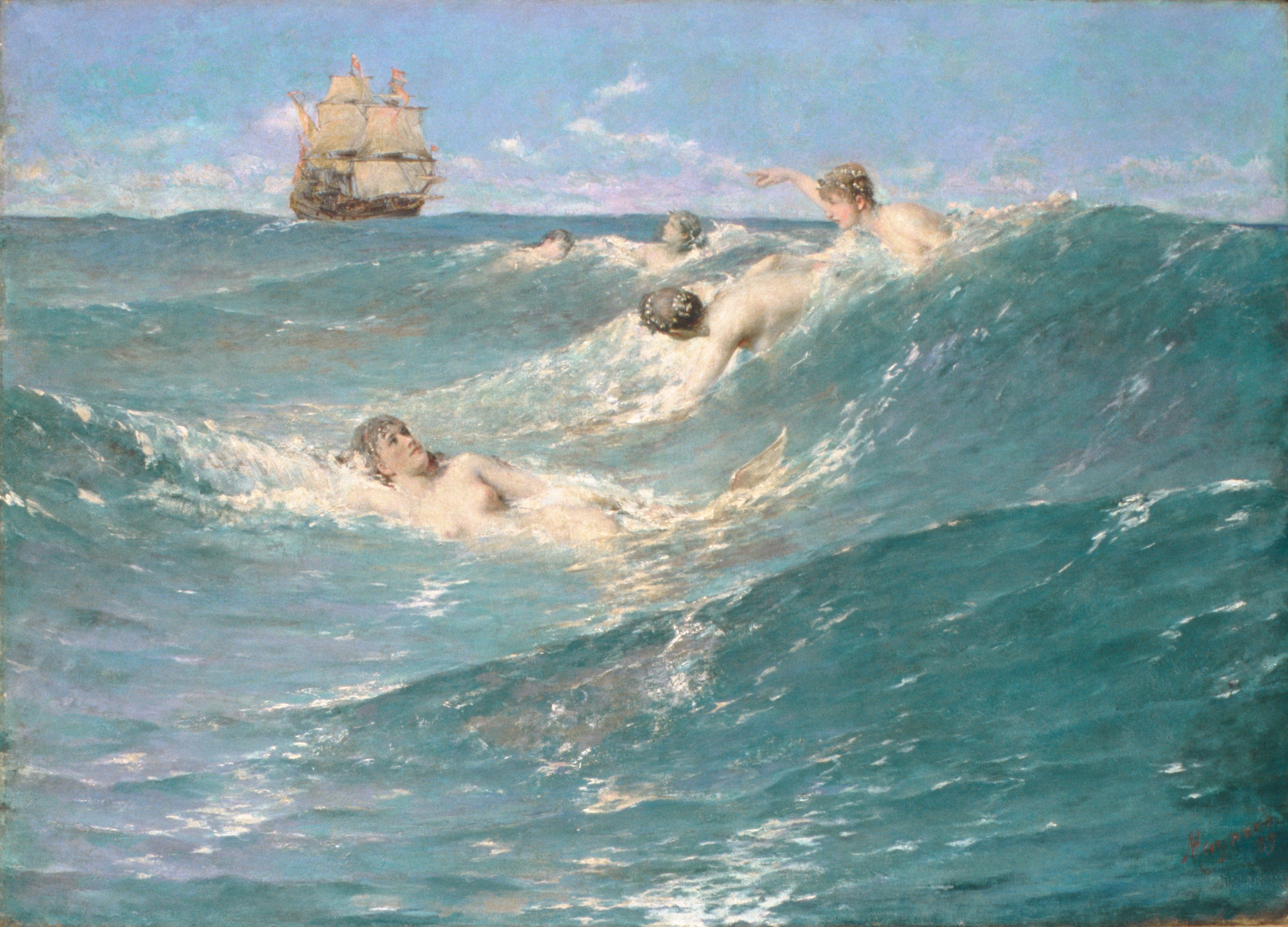
In Strange Seas at the Metropolitan Museum of Art, 1889

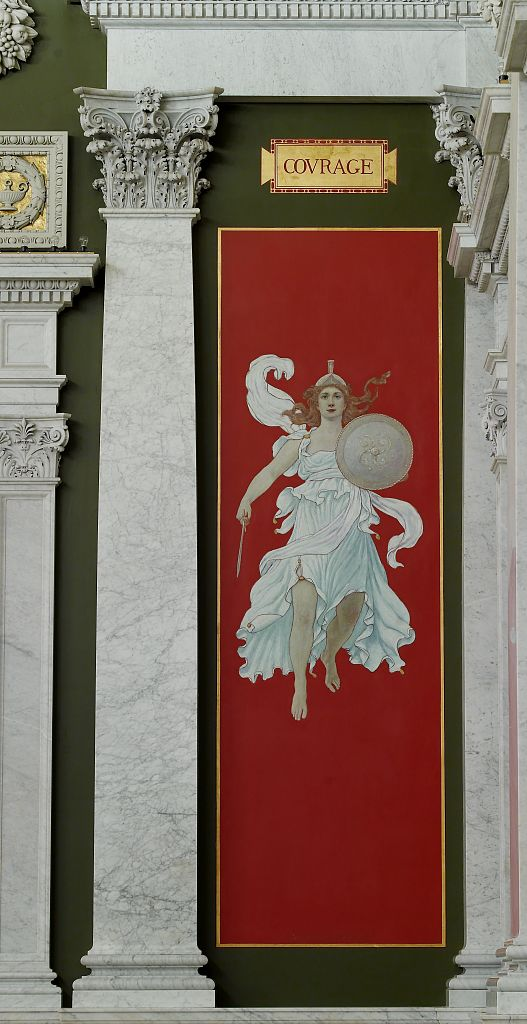
Courage

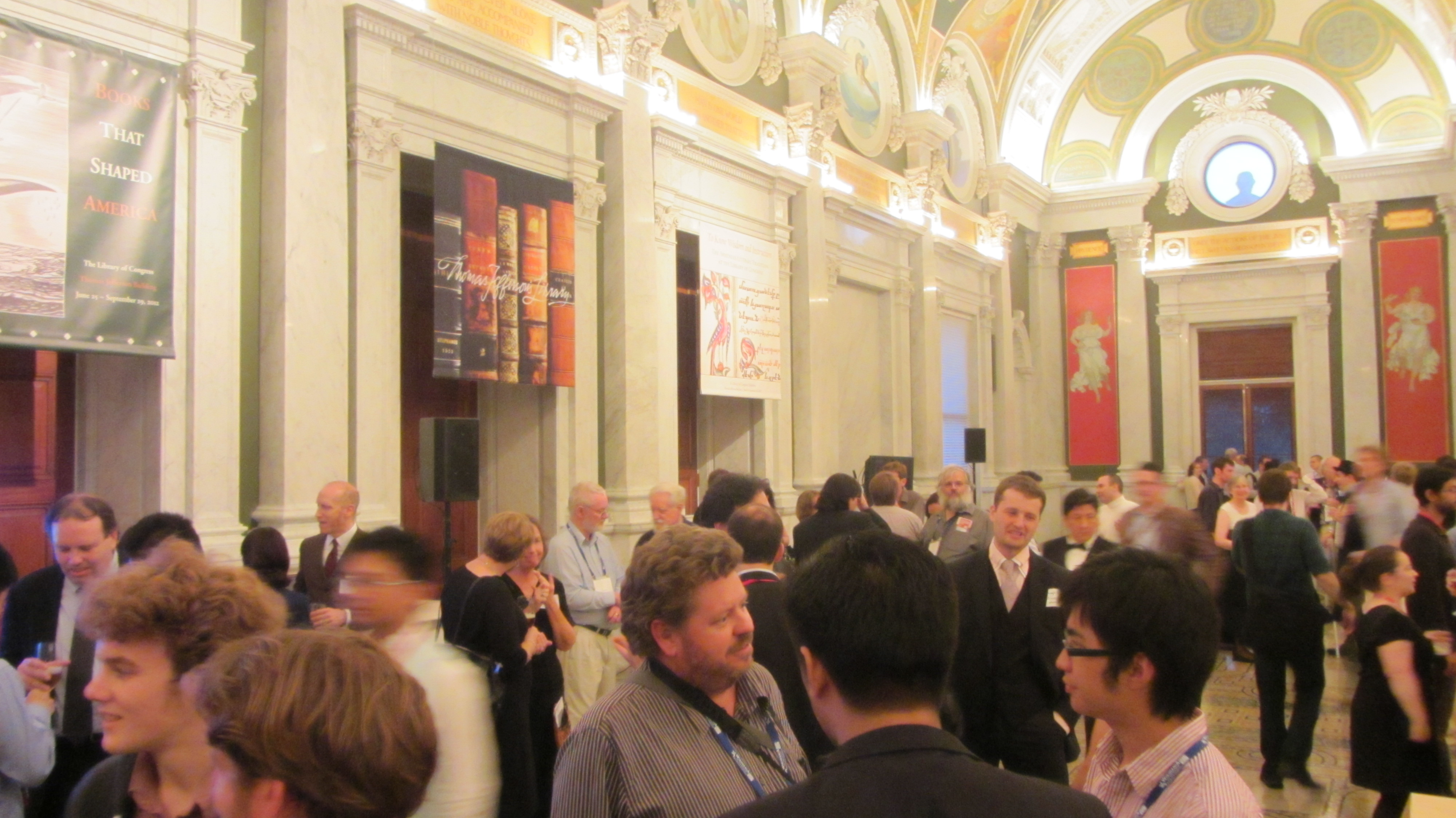
Justice and Courage (background, right)

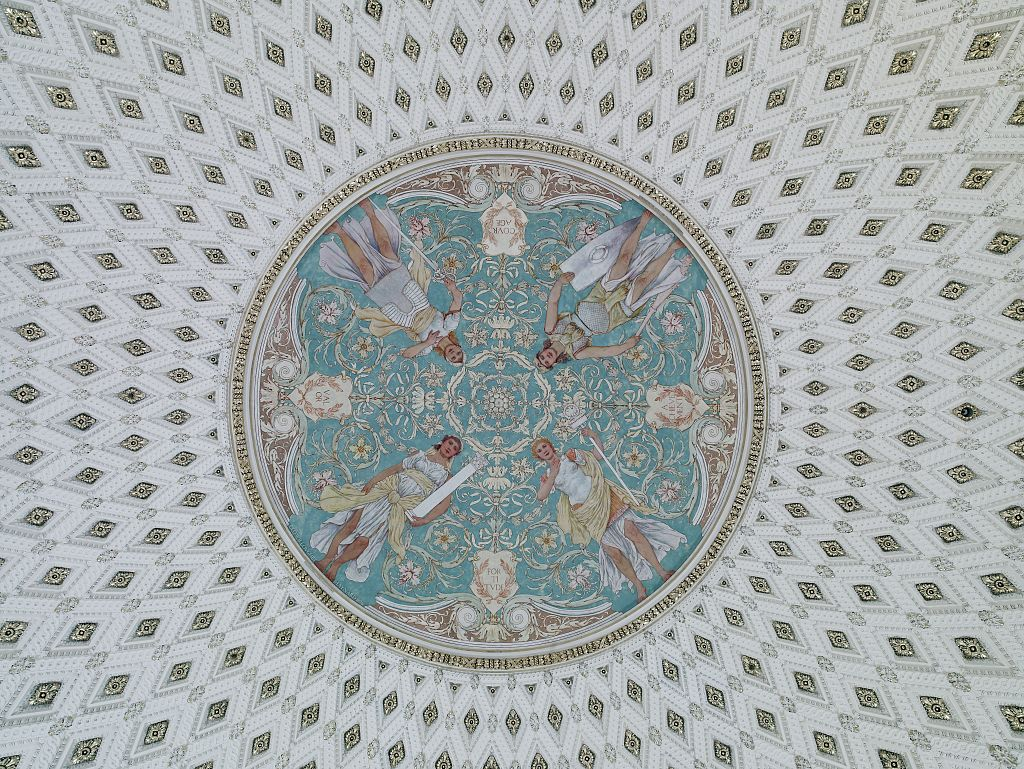
Courage - Valor - Fortitude - Achievement

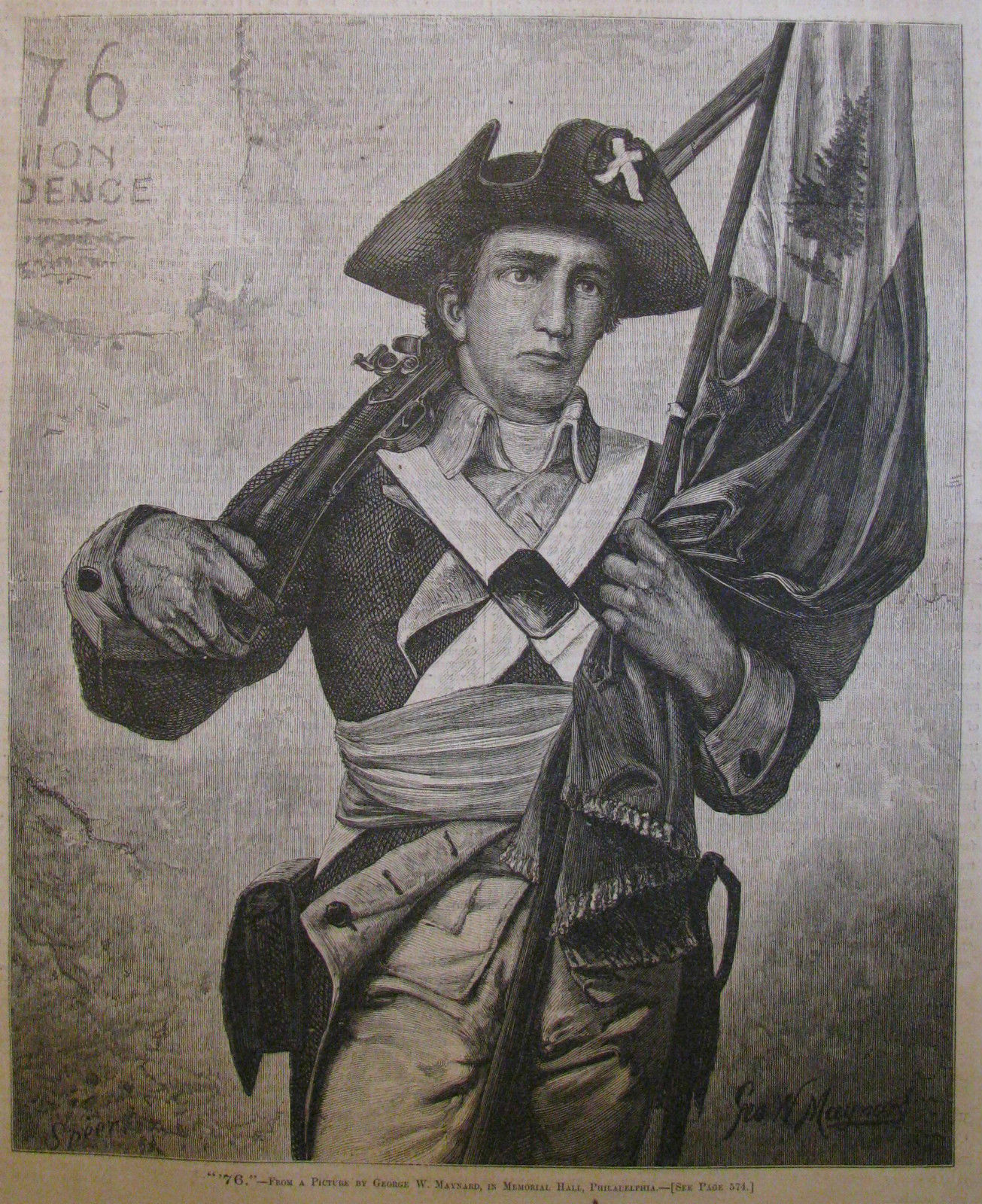
'76 (Soldier of the Revolution), Harper's Weekly, July 15, 1876
