= Eugene Speicher =

American painter

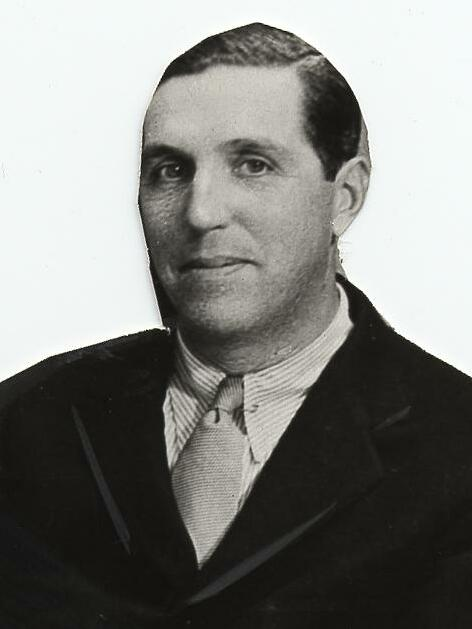
- Speicher c. 1920
- Born: April 5, 1883; Buffalo, New York
- Died: May 11, 1962 (aged 79)
- Known for: Painting

Eugene (Edward) Speicher NA (April 5, 1883 – May 11, 1962) was an American portrait, landscape, and figurative painter. He was one of the foremost realists of his generation who closely upheld the mantle of his mentor, Robert Henri.

== Biography ==
Speicher was born in Buffalo, New York. He began his studies in art at the Albright Art School. He moved to New York in 1907 and began attending the Art Students League where he studied with William Merritt Chase and Frank Vincent Du Mond. In 1908, he won the school's Kelley Prize with a portrait of fellow student Georgia O'Keeffe. In 1909 took life classes with Robert Henri at the New York School of Art, which he found of great importance to his formative style. Through Henri, with whom he became close friends, he also became acquainted with George Bellows, with whom he also became close, and with Rockwell Kent, Edward Hopper, Guy Pène du Bois, Leon Kroll, and a coterie of realist artists with whom he associated. In 1910, he went to Europe, where he remained for two years to study the Old Masters in Paris, the Netherlands, and Spain. Upon his return, he settled in New York, and was considered by many as a promising of the younger group of American painters. He discovered Woodstock, New York, soon after and began to split his time between Manhattan and Woodstock, where he became a prominent figure in the art colony.

From the teens, Speicher began to receive a steady stream of awards and honors. By the 1920s Speicher was considered a leading portrait artist in America, practicing a form of realism. Among the awards he received was the Beck Gold medal for portraiture at the Pennsylvania Academy of the Fine Arts in Philadelphia in January 1920, for his painting Russian Girl. In 1926 he was awarded the Potter Palmer Gold medal at the Art Institute of Chicago for The Lace Scarf. In 1936 Esquire magazine called him America's most important living painter. He was also awarded the Temple Gold Medal at the Pennsylvania Academy of the Fine Arts in 1938 for Marianna.

Recognized for his work in portraiture, Speicher’s renown allowed him to support himself with commissions, and he also executed many flower still lifes and landscapes. Always favoring female subjects, he was also one of the few moderns to undertake nudes for which he became known. Speicher’s compositions are known as analytical and methodical in their design and execution.

He was nominated an associate of the National Academy of Design in 1912 and a full academician in 1925. Speicher was appointed director of the American Academy of Arts and Letters in 1945. His work was also part of the painting event in the art competition at the 1932 Summer Olympics.

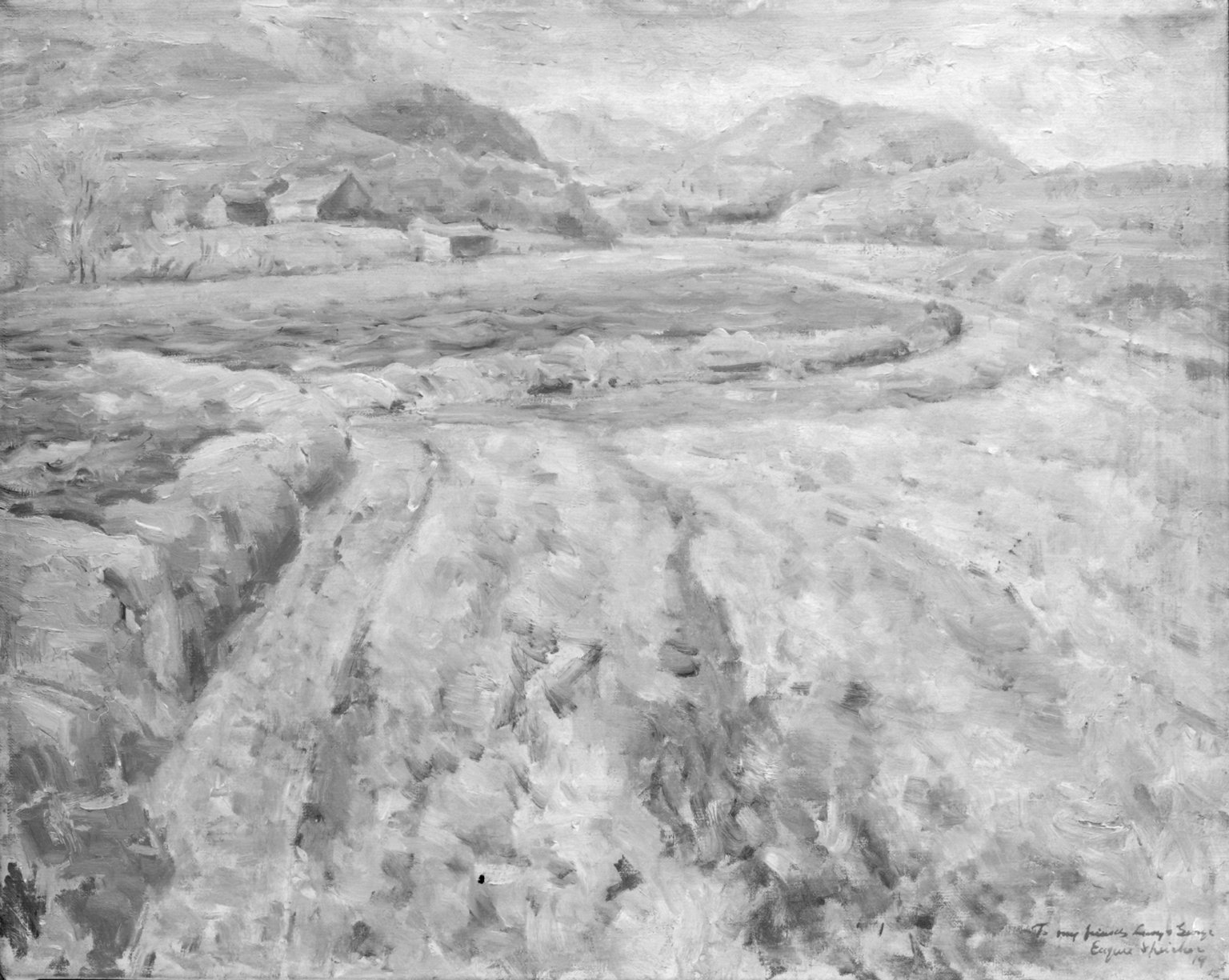
''Landscape'' by Eugene E. Speicher in the Brooklyn Museum

== Works ==
- "Morning Light" (1912), a charming landscape (Metropolitan Museum)
- "The Girl in Rose" (1913)
- John Nelson Cole (1914)
- Miss Helen Appleton (Thomas R. Proctor Prize, National Academy, 1911)
- Charles Dana Gibson
- Miss Mary Stuart Snyder
- Actress Katharine Cornell in her role as Candida
