= Arthur Parton =

American painter (1842–1914)

- Born: 1842; Hudson, New York, U.S.
- Died: 1914 (aged 71–72); Yonkers, New York, U.S.
- Occupation: Landscape painter

Arthur Parton (1842–1914) was an American landscape painter. He was a member of the Hudson River School.

== Biography ==
Parton was born in 1842 in Hudson, New York. He was trained at the Pennsylvania Academy of the Fine Arts under the tutelage of William Trost Richards. Parton began exhibiting his work in Philadelphia when he was 22. He spent a year in Europe in 1869, after which his paintings began to take on aspects of the Barbizon School.

Parton had a studio at the Tenth Street Studio Building in New York City from 1874 to 1893. His Shenandoah River painting was published in William Cullen Bryant's Picturesque America.

Parton became an associate of the National Academy of Design in 1871. He was named a National Academician in 1884. Parton's 1889 Winter on the Hudson won the Temple Silver Medal.

In 1893, Parton sold 119 of his paintings at the Fifth Avenue Art Galleries in New York City. He died in 1914 in Yonkers, New York. His brother, Ernest Parton, was also a painter.
