= Julian E. Levi =

American painter (1900–1982)

Julian Edwin Levi
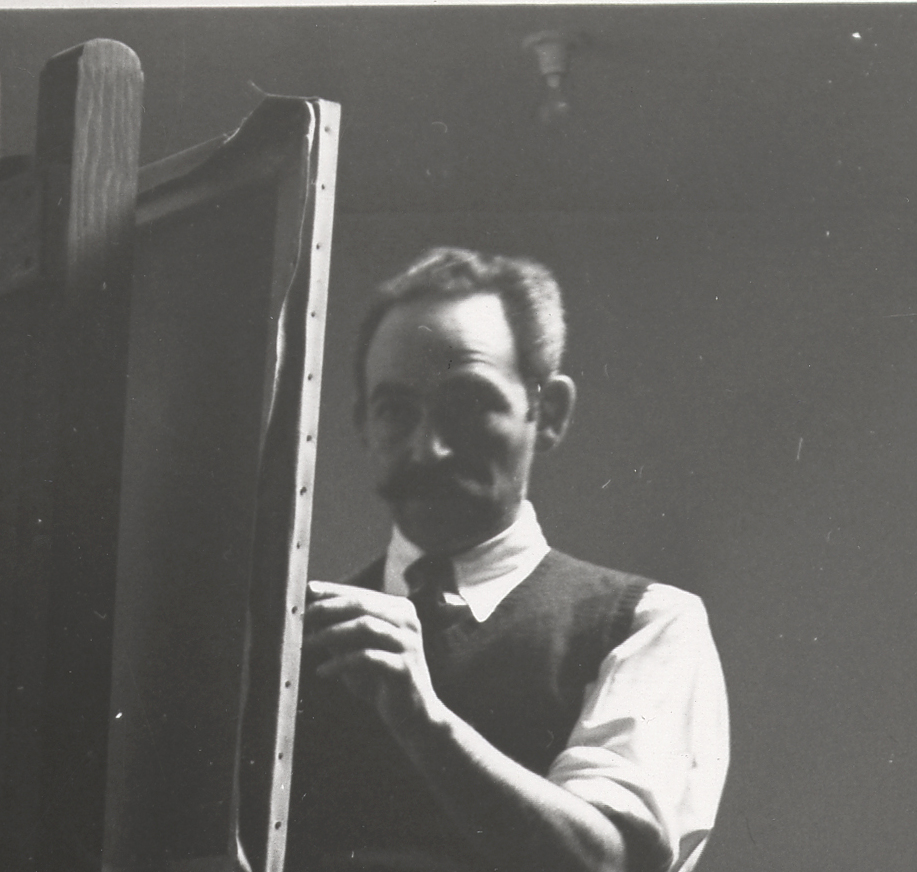
- Levi in 1940
- Born: 1900; Yorkville, New York, U.S.
- Died: 1982 (aged 81–82)
- Education: Pennsylvania Academy of the Fine Arts
- Known for: Painting, muralist
- Awards: 1962 Temple Gold Medal

Julian Edwin Levi (1900–1982) was an American painter. He was a 1968 Resident of the American Academy in Rome. He should not be confused with the New York art dealer Julien Levy, who introduced Salvador Dalí to American patrons at his Julien Levy Gallery.

== Life ==
He was born in Yorkville, New York. He grew up in Philadelphia. He studied at the Pennsylvania Academy of the Fine Arts. He was a member of the Federal Art Project.

He taught at the Art Students League of New York, New School, and Pennsylvania Academy of the Fine Arts.

His work is held by the Museum of Modern Art, and the Society for Contemporary Art. His papers are held at the Archives of American Art. He was elected into the National Academy of Design in 1973 as an Associate member and became a full Academician in 1976.
