= International Society of Sculptors, Painters and Gravers =

Defunct union of professional artists

- Formation: 1898
- Dissolved: 1925
- Type: Artists' union
- 1st president: James McNeill Whistler
- 2nd president: Auguste Rodin
- 3rd president: William Orpen

The International Society of Sculptors, Painters and Gravers was a union of professional artists that existed from 1898 to 1925, "To promote the study, practice, and knowledge of sculpture, painting, etching, lithographing, engraving, and kindred arts in England or elsewhere...". It came to be known simply as The International. The society organised exhibitions, some for members only and some open to others, and social events such as musical evenings and soirées. The exhibitions were held in a number of London venues, and in other cities around England, including Nottingham and Manchester. Its founder and first president was James McNeill Whistler. On his death, the presidency was taken up by Auguste Rodin, with John Lavery as vice-president. The society contributed £500 towards the cost of Whistler's memorial.

== Formation ==
The society was initially incorporated as The Exhibition of International Art Ltd., but soon changed its name to the International Society of Sculptors, Painters and Gravers. The prospectus issued by the new society read in part:

"… a Society for the promotion of Exhibitions of International Art has been formed, the aim of the organisers being to hold exhibitions of the finest art of the day … in May, June and July at Prince's Skating Rink, Knightsbridge, a building which when suitably altered and arranged will be unusually well adapted for that purpose. The Gallery will be known as the International Gallery and a feature of the exhibitions will be the non-recognition of nationality in art …"

== Members ==
Honorary and associate members included:

- Paul Wayland Bartlett
- Alexander Kellock Brown
- Ernest A. Cole
- John Paul Cooper
- Nelson Dawson
- Alfred Drury
- John Henry Monsell Furse
- Alfred Gilbert
- Charles Holroyd
- John Humphreys Johnston
- Thomas Stirling Lee
- David McGill
- Gari Melchers
- Constantin Meunier
- Ernst Oppler
- Glyn Warren Philpot
- Alfred William Rich
- Charles de Sousy Ricketts
- William Rothenstein
- Augustus Saint-Gaudens
- Georg Sauter
- Kathleen Scott
- Charles Shannon
- Franz Stuck
- James Havard Thomas
- John Tweed
- Reginald Fairfax Wells
- Harry (Henry) Wilson

During World War I, the membership of German and Austrian artists was suspended.

== Exhibitions ==
Exhibitions organised by the society included:

- 1898: Exhibition of International Art of The International Society of Sculptors, Painters and Gravers; Prince's Skating Rink, Knightsbridge, London, May–July
- 1899: Second Exhibition of The International Society of Sculptors, Painters and Gravers; Prince's Skating Rink, Knightsbridge, London, May–July
- 1900: No exhibition, on account of the Paris Exposition Universelle of 1900
- 1901: Third Exhibition of the International Society of Sculptors, Painters and Gravers; Galleries of the Royal Institute, 191 Piccadilly, London, October–December
- 1903: American Tour: Boston Art Club, the Buffalo FIne Arts Academy, the Carnegie Museum of Art, the Art Institute of Chicago, the Cinicinnati Art Museum, the Saint Louis School and Museum of Fine Arts—where the exhibition was displayed during the Louisiana Purchase Exposition world's fair.
- 1904: Fourth Exhibition; New Gallery, Regent Street, London, January–March
- 1905: Fifth Exhibition; New Gallery, Regent Street, London, January–February
- 1906: International Society of Sculptors, Painters and Gravers Exhibition; Nottingham Castle Museum
- 1906: Sixth Exhibition; New Gallery, Regent Street, London, January–February
- 1907: Seventh Exhibition; New Gallery, Regent Street, London, January–March
- 1908: Eighth Exhibition; New Gallery, Regent Street, London, January–February
- 1908: Exhibition of Fair Women; International Society of Sculptors, Painters and Gravers, New Gallery, Regent Street, London
- 1909: Ninth Exhibition; New Gallery, Regent Street, London, January–February
- 1909: Exhibition of Fair Women; International Society of Sculptors, Painters and Gravers; New Gallery, Regent Street, London
- 1910: Tenth Annual Exhibition; Grafton Gallery, London, April–May
- 1910: Exhibition of Fair Women; International Society of Sculptors, Painters and Gravers; Grafton Gallery, London, May–June
- 1911: Eleventh Annual Exhibition; Grafton Gallery, London, April–May
- 1911: "A Century of Art, 1810-1910"; Grafton Gallery, June–July
- 1912: Twelfth Annual Exhibition; Grafton Gallery, London, April–May
- 1912: "Contemporary British landscape"; Thirteenth London Exhibition; Grosvenor Gallery
- 1912: "Exhibition of Fair Children"; Grafton Gallery, London, June–July
- 1913: The Spring Exhibition; Fourteenth London Exhibition; Grosvenor Gallery, April–May
- 1913: The Autumn Exhibition; Fifteenth London Exhibition; Grosvenor Gallery, October–November
- 1914: The Spring Exhibition; Sixteenth London Exhibition; Grosvenor Gallery, April–May
- 1914: The Autumn Exhibition; Seventeenth London Exhibition; Grosvenor Gallery, October–November
- 1915: The Spring Exhibition; Eighteenth London Exhibition; Grosvenor Gallery, May–June
- 1915: The Autumn Exhibition; Nineteenth London Exhibition; Grosvenor Gallery, October–November
- 1916: The Spring Exhibition; Twentieth London Exhibition; Grosvenor Gallery, May–July
- 1916: The Autumn Exhibition; Twenty-first London Exhibition; Grosvenor Gallery, October–November
- 1917: Twenty-second Exhibition; Grafton Gallery, June
- 1918: The Summer Exhibition; Twenty-third London Exhibition; Grosvenor Gallery, May
- 1918: The Autumn Exhibition; Twenty-fourth London Exhibition; Grosvenor Gallery, October–November
- 1919: The Spring Exhibition; Twenty-fifth London Exhibition; Grosvenor Gallery, May–July
- 1919: The Autumn Exhibition; Twenty-sixth London Exhibition; Grosvenor Gallery, October
- 1921: The Annual Exhibition; Twenty-seventh London Exhibition; Grafton Gallery, April–May
- 1922: The Annual Exhibition; Twenty-eighth London Exhibition; Grafton Gallery, April–May
- 1925: The Annual Exhibition; Twenty-ninth London Exhibition; Royal Academy
