= Wilton Lockwood =

American painter (1861–1914)

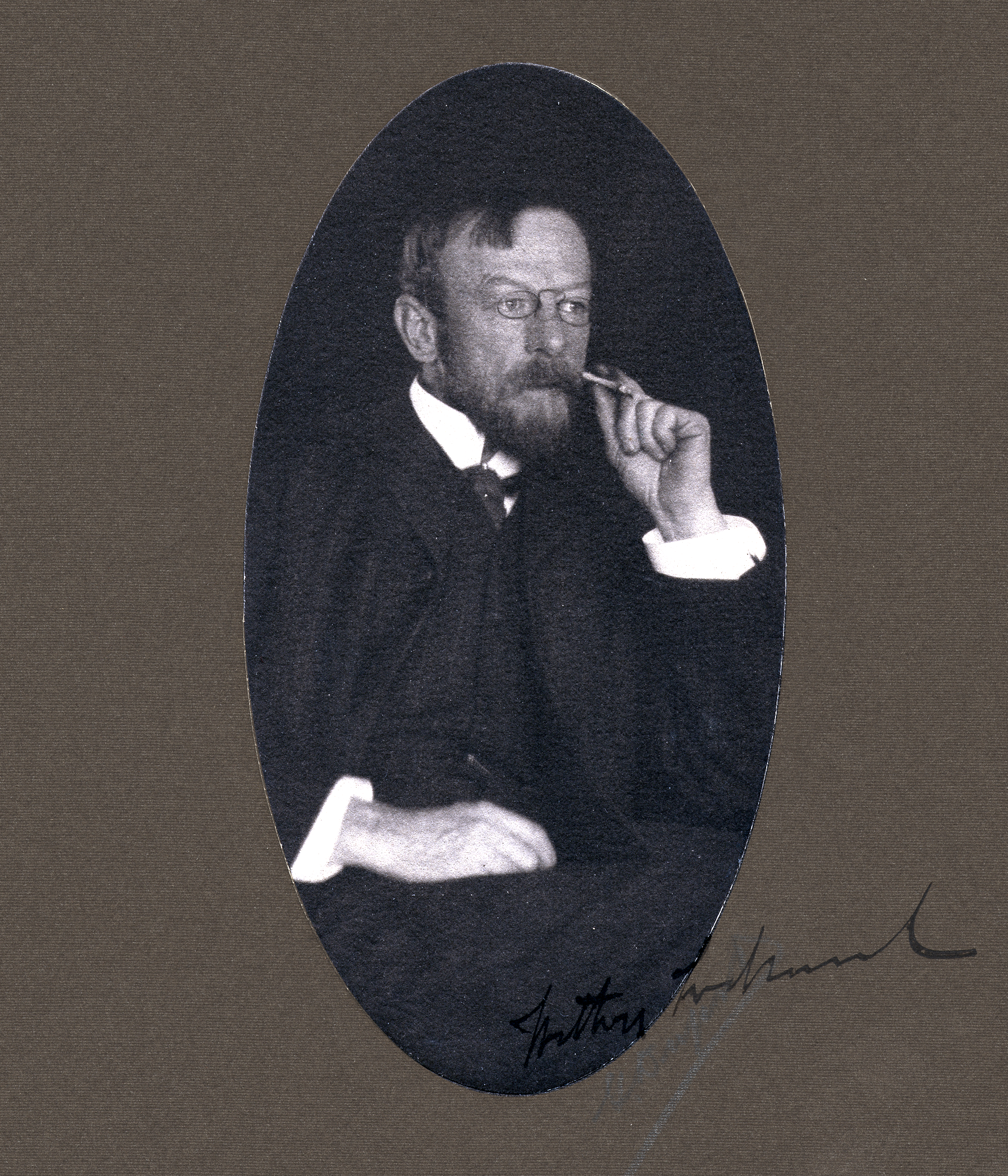
Wilton Lockwood

Wilton Lockwood (September 12, 1861 – March 21, 1914) was an American artist well known for his portrait and still-life paintings.

== Biography ==
Robert Wilton Lockwood, known as Wilton Lockwood, was born in Wilton, Connecticut, a town for which he was named by his parents, Emily Waldon Middlebrook and John Lewis Lockwood. He was descended from Sgt. Robert Lockwood who emigrated to Massachusetts on the Winthrop Fleet from Combs, Suffolk England in 1630. His father was Captain of the 13th New York Cavalry, Company G in the American Civil War and a stockbroker in New York City. His mother died when he was just five years old in 1865. As a boy, he showed distaste for city life and he thus was sent to the home of his aunts at Rowayton, Connecticut.

As a young man, he was employed in a New York broker's office, where his ability to draw attracted some attention and he was introduced to John La Farge. In 1880 he became La Farge's pupil, in whose studio he trained as a stain glass designer, while also attending classes at the Art Students League. In 1886, Lockwood went abroad to Paris, where he furthered his artistic studies under Jean Joseph Benjamin-Constant at the Académie Julian. On occasion, to fund his foreign travel, Lockwood would travel to New York to take on portrait commissions. An example of his portrait work from this time depicts his early mentor La Farge; painted in 1891, it is now in the collection of the Museum of Fine Arts, Boston, which purchased it from the artist in 1909 for $4,000. However, for much of the next decade, Lockwood remained abroad, becoming a well-known portrait and still-life painter.

In 1892, Lockwood married the Bostonian Ethel Whiton-Stone in London. They spent their honeymoon in Cornwall, where he painted numerous watercolors of the harbors, trading ports, fishing villages and sailboats along the neighboring towns of Brixham, Polperro, St. Ives, and Charlestown. He resumed his studies in Munich under Frank Duveneck, and then again in Paris, where his mature style came to fruition.

During his residence abroad, he exhibited several times at the salon of the Société Nationale des Beaux-Arts. In 1895, his work was exhibited at both the Munich International Exhibition and the Triennial Exhibition in Berlin. Lockwood achieved significant critical success in Paris when he exhibited with a group of his portraits at the Champs de Mars Exhibition (or Paris Universal Exposition), where he firmly established his reputation in Europe.

In December of that same year, a well-received one-man exhibition of his work was held at the St. Botolph Club in Boston. The show introduced him to American collectors, and prompted the Lockwoods to settle in Boston the following year. They established a home at 280 Boylston Street and spent their summers at their estate in South Orleans, Cape Cod. There, Lockwood cultivated an award-winning garden, teeming with peonies and roses that occupied his celebrated still-life compositions.

During the later half of the 1890s, Lockwood's reputation continued its ascent, and he secured several prestigious American portrait commissions including those of Justice Oliver Wendell Holmes Jr., former American President Grover Cleveland, and James J. Storrow. He expanded his exhibition circuit to include the Boston Art Club in the late 1890s, the Pennsylvania Academy of Fine Arts almost annually from 1895 through 1913, and the National Academy of Design from 1910 to 1913.

In 1897, his painting of virtuoso Otto Roth titled The Violinist received an honorable mention at the Carnegie Institute Exhibition and the Temple Gold Medal at the Pennsylvania Academy of Fine Arts in 1898. The painting is now at Andrew Carnegie's Skibo Castle in Scotland, UK.

In the early 1900s, Lockwood showed at Durand-Ruel Galleries in New York. Apart from the honors previously mentioned, he was awarded silver medals at The Paris Exposition in 1900, The Pan-American Exposition in Buffalo in 1901, and St. Louis in 1904.

Lockwood was a member of both the Society of American Artists (1898) and the Copley Society of Art in Boston, as well as an associate (in 1902) and academician in 1912 of the National Academy of Design in New York. He was also a member of the Century Association.

Though a celebrated portraitist, Lockwood was best known for his still-life paintings, particularly of the peonies and roses that he cultivated at his summer home in South Orleans on Cape Cod. The estate and his cultivars won numerous awards and was featured in horitulture societies including the American Peony Society, and the Massachusetts Horticultural Society. Along the Atlantic shore, in the bottom of a valley surrounded by hills, Lockwood's entire garden was enclosed by a pergola covered with numerous varieties of climbing and rambler roses. A man-made reflection pool occupied the garden's center, well-stocked with Nymphaea and other water plants, bordered by a grassy bank. Around this bank, was a collection of some three hundred varieties of peonies. Notable among them was a hybrid of the pure yellow peony, paeonia lutea superba.

Lockwood was an enthusiastic and successful amateur of waterfowl. For scientific study, he bred both wild and domesticated waterfowl, with a collection of wild ducks and geese from China and Japan that he had acquired while abroad.

In 1912, Lockwood decided to rent a studio in New York, but fell ill and returned to Boston. He died in 1914 at the age of 52 in Brookline, Massachusetts. In March 1915, the St. Botolph Club mounted a memorial exhibition of his work lementing the loss of "one of the most prominent painters of portraits and flower pieces in this country". That same year, a peony cultivar Paeonia lactiflora 'Wilton Lockwood' was registered by H.W. Shaylor and named in his memory.

Works by Lockwood are held in the permanent collections of the Metropolitan Museum of Art, Museum of Fine Arts, Boston, Carnegie Institute, Worcester Art Museum, and the Isabella Stewart Gardner Museum.
