= Clifford Prevost Grayson =

American painter (1857–1951)

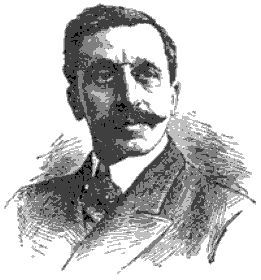
- Born: July 14, 1857; Philadelphia, Pennsylvania, U.S.
- Died: November 11, 1951 (aged 94); Old Lyme, Connecticut, U.S.
- Education: University of Pennsylvania; Pennsylvania Academy of the Fine Arts; École des Beaux-Arts
- Occupations: Painter, teacher
- Spouse: Anna L. Steel (m. 1902; died 1945)

Clifford Prevost Grayson (July 14, 1857 – November 11, 1951) was an American painter and teacher.

== Biography ==
He was born in Philadelphia, the youngest of the three sons of lawyer and newspaper editor Frederick William Grayson and Mary Mallet Prevost. Grayson graduated from the University of Pennsylvania in 1878, and studied at the Pennsylvania Academy of the Fine Arts under Christian Schussele and Thomas Eakins. He studied further at the École des Beaux-Arts in Paris under Jean-Léon Gérôme. After graduation, he joined the artist colonies at Pont Aven and Concarneau, and opened a studio in Paris. Grayson was a regular exhibitor at the Paris Salon during the 1880s.

=== Drexel Institute ===
Grayson returned to Philadelphia in 1890. He was hired as instructor in oil painting at the Drexel Institute of Art, Science and Industry in 1891, and promoted to director of the Art Department in 1893. Under Grayson, the art curriculum expanded from a 2-year to a 4-year program. He hired Howard Pyle as an instructor in 1894, in what became the School of Illustration. Grayson taught portraiture and life classes, and Charles Grafly taught clay modeling and sculpture.

Thomas Eakins had been forced to resign from PAFA in 1886, after using a fully nude male model before female students. Grayson hired him to lecture in anatomy in January 1895, and dismissed him two months later, after Eakins again used a nude male model before a class that included female students.

Grafly took a one-year sabbatical in 1895, and Grayson hired Cyrus Dallin to teach the sculpture classes. The Art Department seemed to flourish under Grayson, attracting students such as Maxfield Parrish, Elizabeth Shippen Green, Jessie Willcox Smith, Violet Oakley and Frank Schoonover. After being ordered to make severe budget cuts, Grayson tendered his resignation in December 1904. He left Drexel in June 1905, following the announcement of the dissolution of the Art Department.

=== Later career ===
Grayson was an active member of the summer artist colony at Old Lyme, Connecticut.

=== Honors and awards ===
Grayson received Honorable Mentions at the Paris Salon of 1883 and 1885. The American Art Association awarded him the 1886 $2,000 Purchase Prize for Mid-day Dreams, and donated the painting to the Corcoran Gallery of Art. He exhibited semi-regularly in PAFA's annual exhibitions, from 1876 to 1905. PAFA awarded him the 1887 Temple Gold Medal for The Fisherman's Family, and purchased the painting for its collection.

Grayson was a member of the Art Club of Philadelphia, and the Salmagundi Club and Century Association in New York City.

=== Personal ===
Grayson married Anna L. Steel (1867–1945) on January 21, 1902. They lived at 262 S. 15th Street, Philadelphia, and had a daughter, Helen, and a son, Clifford Jr. They retired to Old Lyme, Connecticut.

Robert Vonnoh painted a three-quarter-length portrait of Grayson. It was exhibited at the inaugural exhibition of The National Association of Portrait Painters in March-April 1912, and praised by critic G. Mortimer Marke.

== Selected works ==
- A Breton Idyl, exhibited at Salon of 1882, unlocated
- Village Spring, Pont Aven (1882), private collection
- Rainy Day at Pont Aven (1882), ex collection: Art Institute of Chicago, private collection. Honorable mention: Salon of 1883
- Boat, Ahoy! (1884), exhibited at Salon of 1884
- The Fisherman's Family (1885), ex collection: PAFA. Honorable mention: Salon of 1885; Temple Gold Medal, PAFA, 1887
- Mid-day Dreams (1886), ex collection: Corcoran Gallery of Art. $2,000 Purchase Prize, American Art Association, 1886
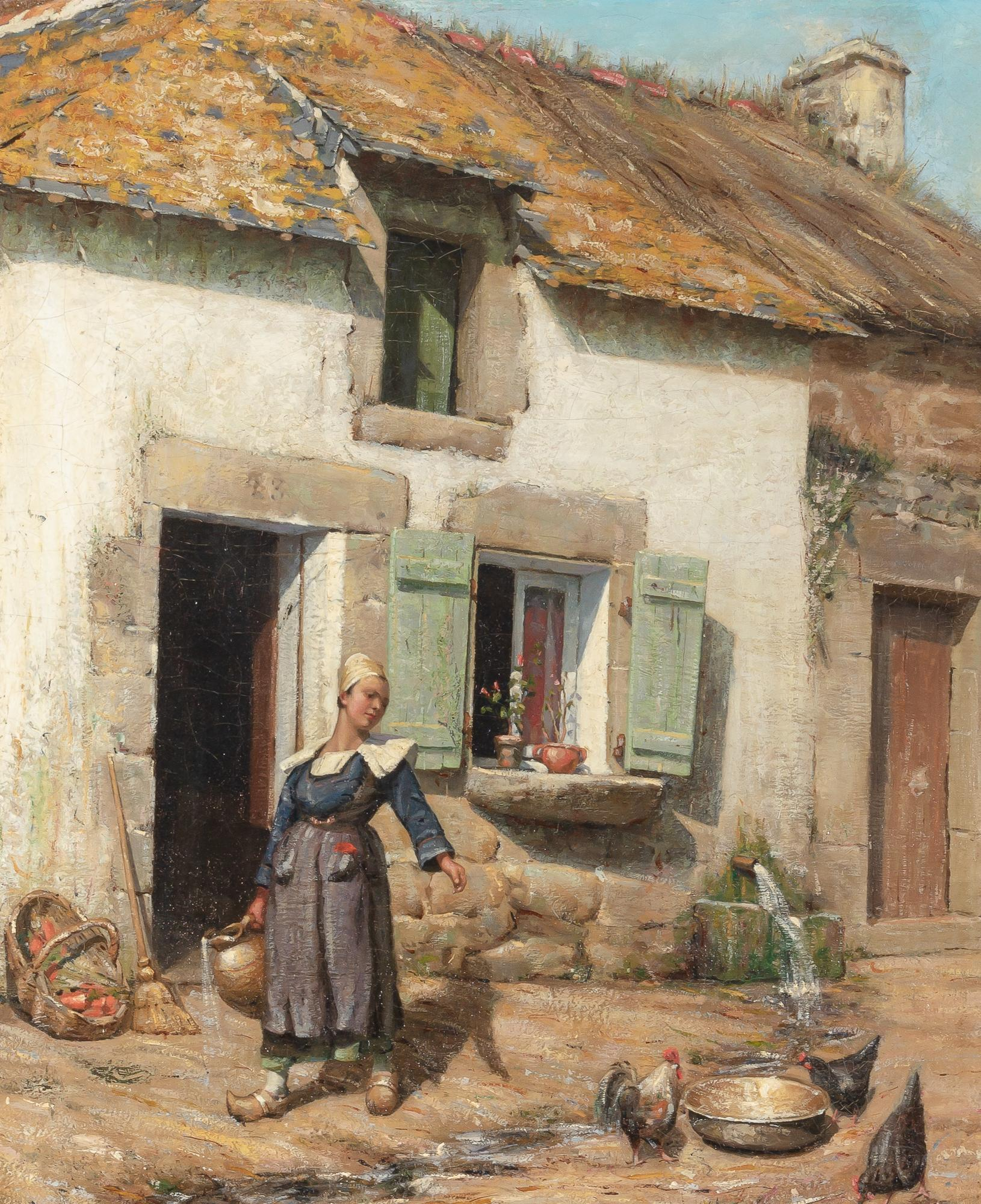
Village Spring, Pont Aven (1882), private collection

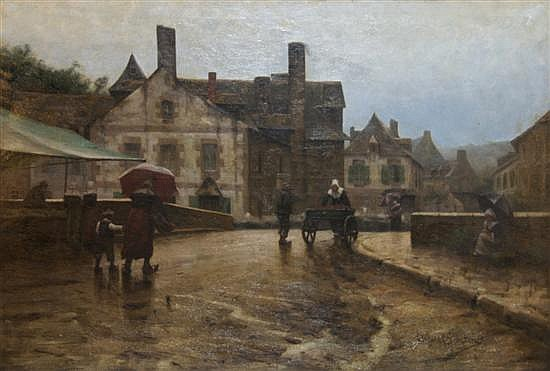
Rainy Day in Pont Aven (1882), private collection

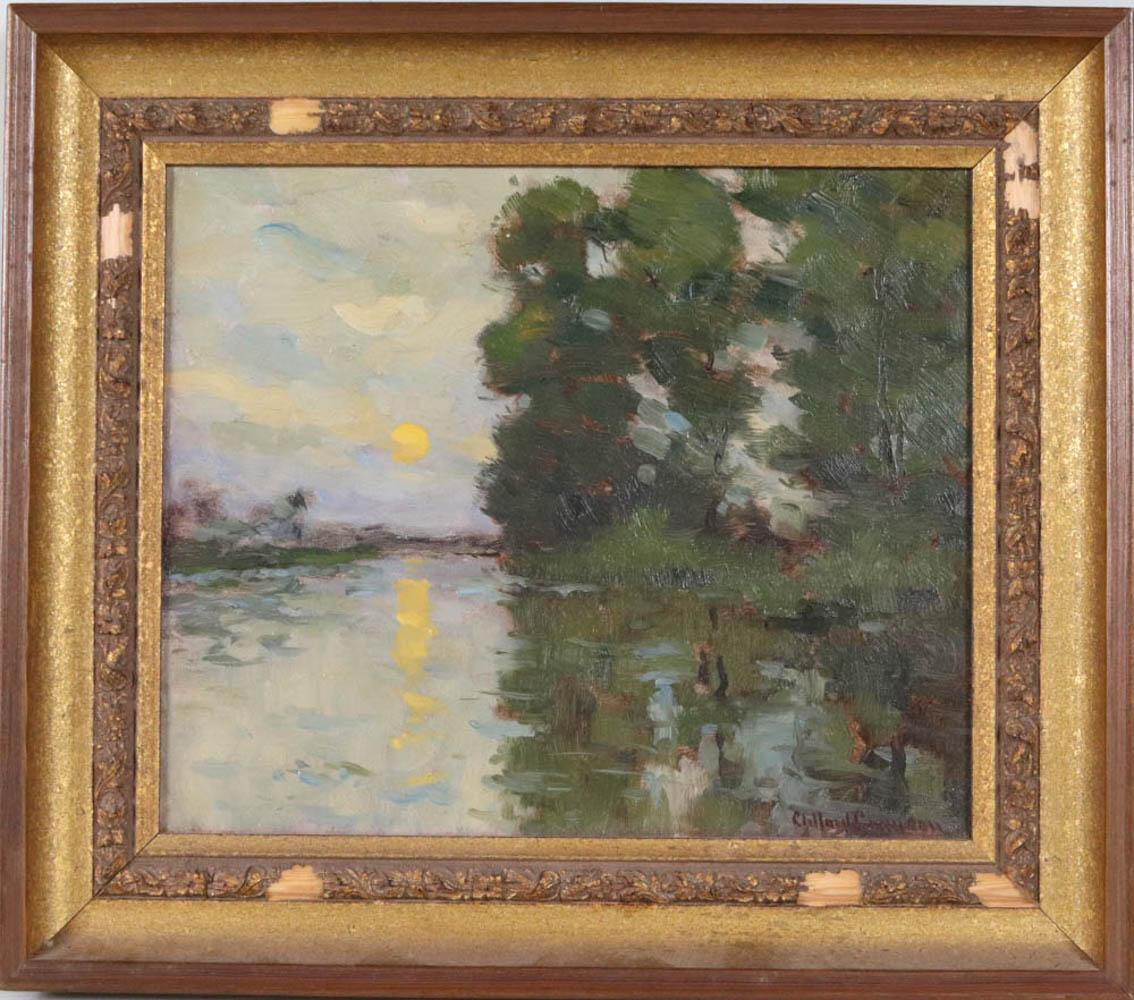
Moonlight on the Water (1909), private collection

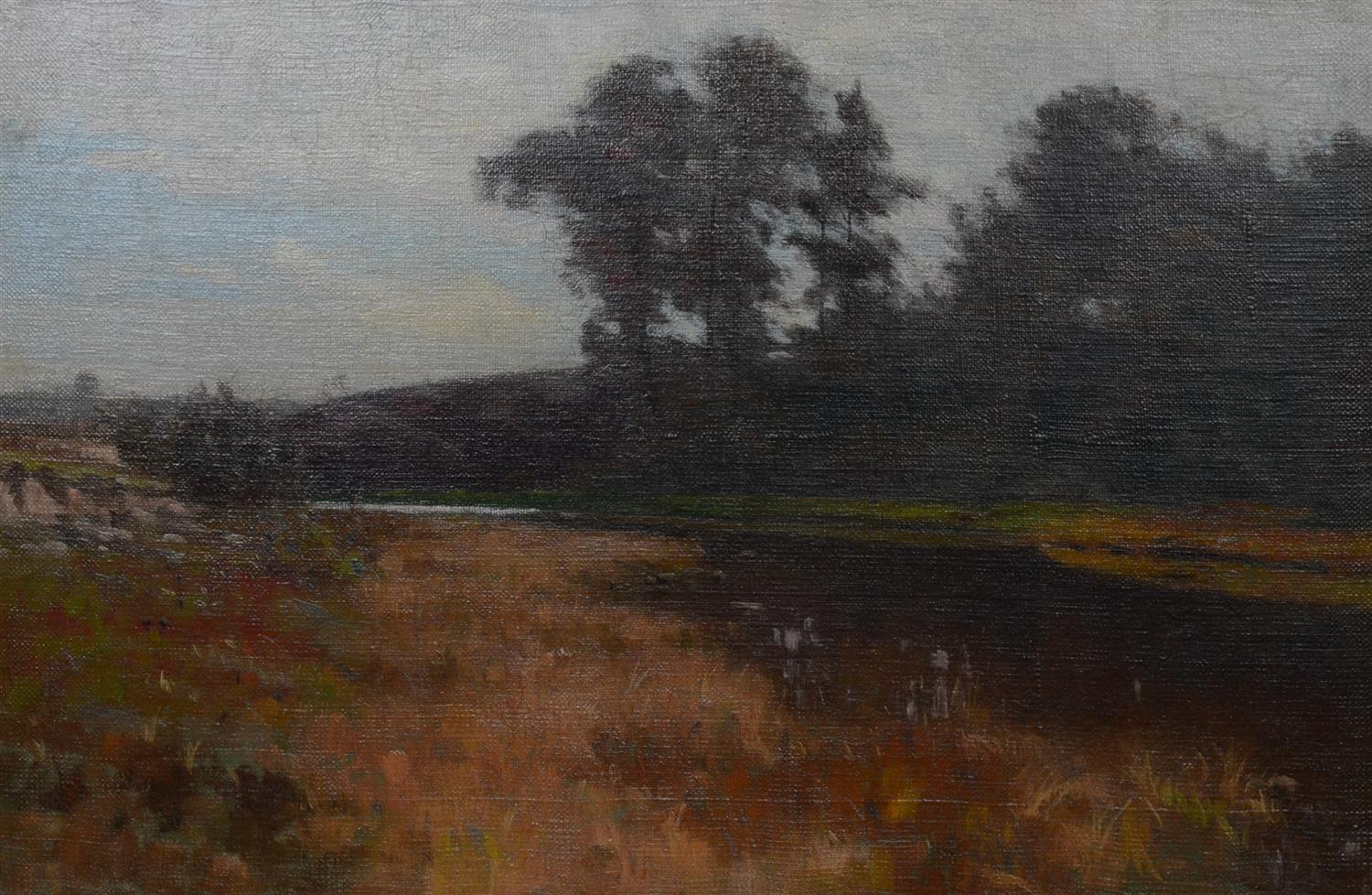
Neshaminy Creek (undated), private collection
