= John Humphreys Johnston =

American artist (1857–1941)

- Born: John Johnston; November 2, 1857; New York City, New York, US
- Died: 1941 (aged 83–84); Cannes, France
- Education: Columbia University
- Style: Aestheticism
- Awards: Temple Gold Medal; Chevalier of the Legion of Honor

John Humphreys Johnston (November 2, 1857 – 1941), born as John Johnston and also known as Humphreys Johnston, was an American artist who was active in the late 19th and early 20th centuries. Johnston began his career as a stained glass artist with John La Farge in New York City. Later, he lived in France and Italy, where he specialized in painting. He received the Temple Gold Medal and was included in exhibitions at three world's fairs. However, by the end of his life, Johnston was better known as an art collector than an artist.

== Early life ==
John Johnston was born in New York City, New York on November 2, 1857. His parents were Mary Hoppin (née Humphreys) and James Boorman Johnston, a successful merchant in New York City. His uncle was John Taylor Johnston, president of the Central Railroad of New Jersey and the founding president of the Metropolitan Museum of Art. Johnston grew up in Manhattan in his father's house at 14 West Tenth Street.

Johnston attended Columbia University. While there he was a member of the fraternity of Delta Psi (St. Anthony Hall). He studied art with James Carroll Beckwith and John La Farge in New York City. La Farge was based in a 10th Street Studio Building owned by Johnston's father and, then, his uncle. In Paris, Johnston studied under Henri Lucien Doucet and Jules Joseph Lefebvre.

Johnston legally changed his name to John Humprehys Johnston in August 1888.

== Career ==
Johnston was active as an artist in the late 19th and early 20th centuries. In the early 1880s, he starting working at the La Farge Decorative Art Co. as an assistant to John La Farge, a stained glass artist who was a rival of Louis Comfort Tiffany. In this capacity, Johnston helped La Farge create The Vision of St. John the Evangelist for Trinity Church in Boston, Massachusetts.

After La Farge's business dissolved due to financial mismanagement in 1885, the Crane family of Acorn Hall commissioned Johnston to design a triptych memorial stained glass window for the sanctuary at the Church of the Redeemer in Morristown, New Jersey. His St. Celia was unveiled and dedicated in 1886. Johnston also created two stained glass windows, The Vision of St. John and The Two Marys at the Sepulchre for the Church of the Ascension on 10th Street in Manhattan, between 1886 and 1888.

After relocating to Europe, Johnston became known for his paintings of landscapes, portraits, and allegorical and genre works. His works were in "the modern style of expression". In 1890, he began exhibiting paintings in various shows at the Champs de Mars Salon in Paris. By 1894, Johnston had worked in Paris and Spain and returned to the United States for exhibitions. Some of his paintings were included at an exhibition at the Century Club of New York City in January 1894. The New York Times noted, "He has a good feeling for color and likes a shadowy style of work, which appeals to the elect, but is a stumbling block to the uninitiated".

In February 1894, around fifty of Johnston's watercolor and oil paintings were displayed at the Klackner Galleries at 5 West 28th Street in New York City. This exhibition showcased the extent of his European travels, with scenes of Brittany, the Caucasus region of Russia, and Spain. The critic from the New York World called it "a very brilliant exposition". The New York Times review noted that some of Johnston's works were "a study of color as if for stained glass". The Times art critic continued, writing:

Having been a colorist, he has added to that natural gift a skill in drawing for which he deserves congratulation. He has almost complete control of technical methods and prefers to use them in the way of suggesting ideas rather than telling a story. He aims at the employment of color and form as a musician uses sound—not in order to make positive statements, but to start trains of thought in the minds of those who look at his pictures. The little exhibit cannot fail to be highly relished by those who enjoy the subtler side of painting.

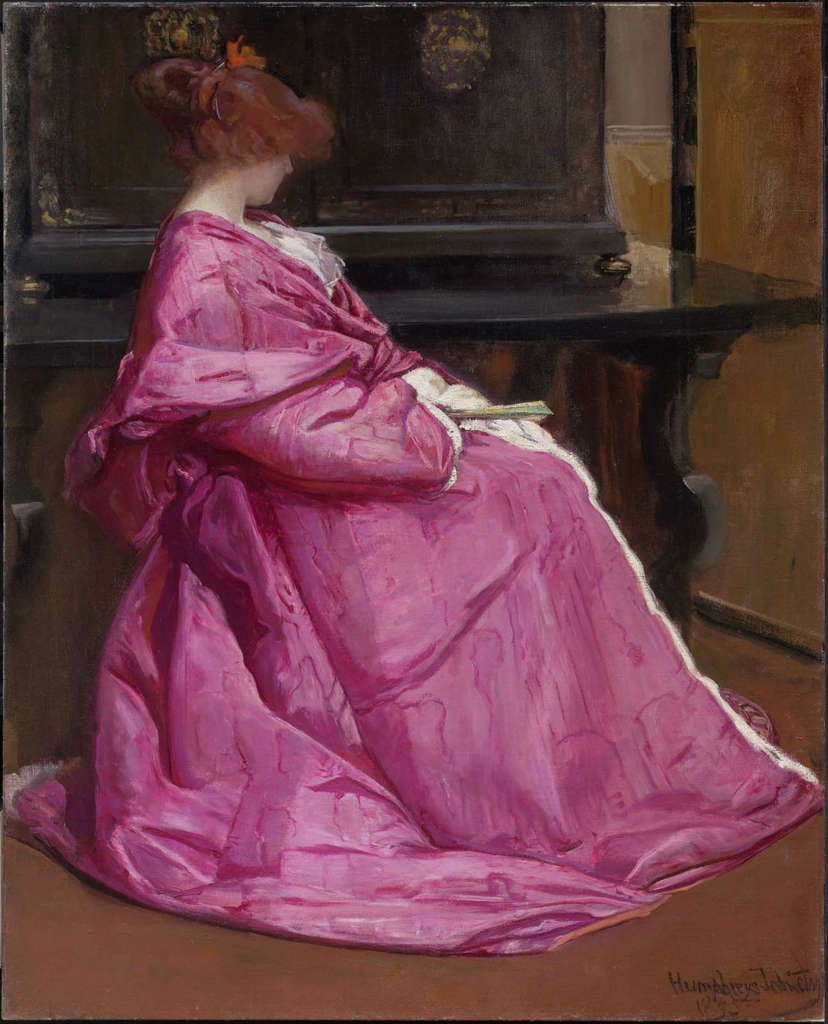
Le Domino Rose

The New York Tribune wrote, "He is throughout inclined to a quality more vigorous than artistic. But there remains in his crude color an undeniable charm. He is at least fresh and strong".

After wintering in New York City, Johnston returned to Paris in the spring of 1894. He eventually maintained studios in both Paris and Venice, Italy. He became an associate member of the Champs de Mars Salon (Société Nationale des Beaux-Arts) in the summer of 1894. In November 1895, his work was included in an exhibition in Germany that honoring the eightieth birthday of Andreas Achenbach. Four of his paintings, including Portrait of My Mother, were included in the 1896 Champs de Mars Salon annual exhibition.

He was elected to the Society of American Artists in New York City in April 1896. That year, he won the Temple Gold Medal from the Pennsylvania Academy of the Fine Arts for the painting Le Domino Rose, now in the collection of the Museum of Fine Arts, Boston.

In 1898, Johnston's painting of Sarah Bernhardt as Hamlet, Lorenzaccio, was displayed at the annual exhibition in Paris. In March 1899, Lorenzaccio was displayed in the gallery of the Society of American Artists, while his work Moonlight; Pointe de Beg-Meil, Finistere was displayed in an exhibit of the Carnegie Museum of Art's permanent collection. That year, he also won a prize at the International Society of Sculptors, Painters and Gravers exhibition in London, England.

In 1900, a large portrait by Johnston was included in the United States' exhibit at the 1900 Paris Exposition. In 1901, three of his paintings were displayed in the Fine Arts Building at the Pan-American Exposition in Buffalo, New York, including Portrait of Mrs. Grant La Farge, Moonlight, Belle-Isle-sur-Mer, Brittany, and a figural of a woman called Light Nights or Lyse Naetter. In both world's fairs, his work was displayed with his contemporary expats John Singer Sargent and James McNeill Whistler. Johnston received a silver medal his work in the 1900 Paris Exposition, and a silver medal at Buffalo. He also received a gold medal in Munich, Germany in 1901. In addition, the French government awarded him the Chevalier of the Legion of Honor in 1901.

In 1902, Johnston's painting, Portrait of Mrs. Benoi Lockwood was included in the 71st annual exhibition of the Pennsylvania Academy of the Fine Arts in Philadelphia, Pennsylvania. In 1903, Johnston was one of the few Americans included in the International Society of Sculptors, Painters and Gravers' first exhibition in America, which was shown at the Boston Art Club, the Buffalo FIne Arts Academy, the Carnegie Museum of Art, the Art Institute of Chicago, the Cinicinnati Art Museum, the Saint Louis School and Museum of Fine Arts—where the exhibition was displayed during the Louisiana Purchase Exposition world's fair. His work in that exhibit was The Vision of St. Paul at Lystra, which received the silver medal at the world's fair. In 1905 and 1906, a painting by Johnston was included in the Internazionale d'Art della Citta di Venezia, the international art exhibition in Venice.

In Paris, Johnston was a member of the Paris Society of American Painters, the Société Internationale de Peinture et Sculpture, and was an associate member of the Société Nationale des Beaux-Arts in Paris. He belonged to the London-based International Society of Sculptors, Painters and Gravers and served on its council. He was also a member of the Society of American Artists in New York City.

== Legacy ==
At the time of his death, Johnston was better known as an art collector than an artist. His works are included in the collections of the Carnegie Museum of Art; the Museum of Fine Arts, Boston; and the Wilstach Trust Collection in Philadelphia, Pennsylvania. In 1901, Portrait of My Mother was purchased for the Musée du Luxembourg in Paris and now belongs to the Musée d'Orsay in Paris, along with another work by Johnston. The central panel of St Cecilia has been restored and is in the collection of the Morris County Historical Society.

== Personal life ==
Johnston was a member of the Century Club, Riding Club, and the Metropolitan Museum of Art in New York City. Sometime between 1886 and 1890, Johnston moved to Europe, where he lived for the rest of his life.

He married Anne "Annie" Lazarus on June 22, 1899, in Venice at Ca’ Rezzonico, the palazzo of artist Robert Barrett Browning. Annie was the sister of Emma Lazarus, the poet whose poem was imortalized on the pedestal of the Statue of Liberty. The couplle lived in the Palazzo Contarini dal Zaffo on the Grand Canal in Venice. Since Lazarus was Jewish and Johnston was Episcopalian, she "recreated herself as a genteel Protestant".

In 1900, Johnston lived in Paris, France. In 1912, he had returned to Venice. Johnston died in 1941 in Cannes, France.
