= Temple Gold Medal =

Award given by the Pennsylvania Academy of the Fine Arts

Joseph E. Temple Fund Gold Medal
- Description: Award for the best oil painting by an American artist
- Country: United States
- Presented by: Pennsylvania Academy of the Fine Arts (PAFA)
- Status: Defunct

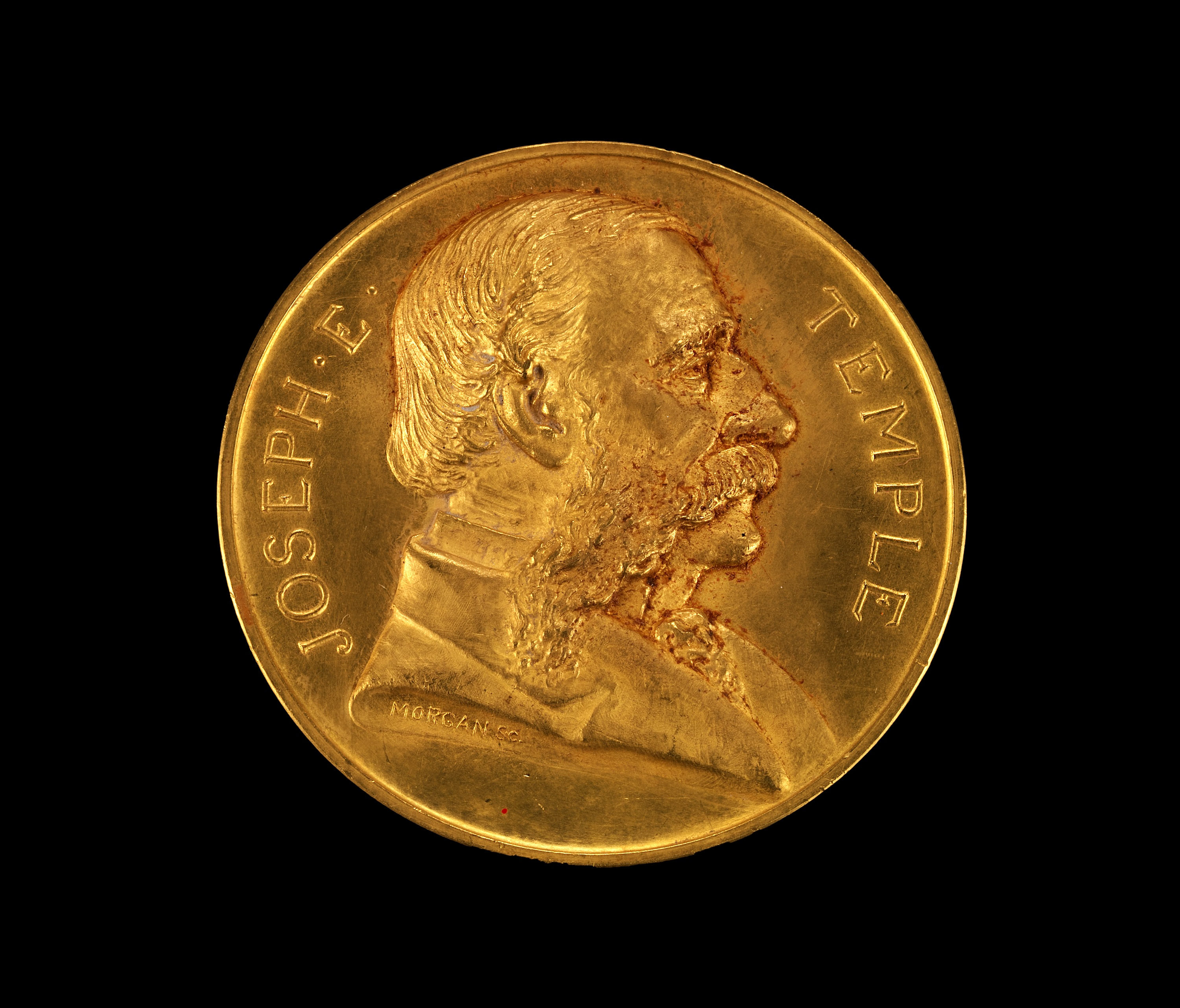
Joseph E. Temple Fund Gold Medal, designed by George Thomas Morgan

Joseph E. Temple Fund Gold Medal (defunct) was a prestigious art prize awarded by the Pennsylvania Academy of the Fine Arts most years from 1883 to 1968. A Temple Medal recognized the best oil painting by an American artist shown in PAFA's annual exhibition. Recipients included John Singer Sargent, James Whistler, Henry Koerner, Cecilia Beaux, Winslow Homer, Thomas Eakins, Robert Henri and Edward Hopper.

== History ==
The medal was named for Philadelphia merchant Joseph E. Temple (1811–1880), a patron of the arts and PAFA Board member, whose bequest of $51,000 funded the awards.

Any American artist was welcome to submit works for PAFA's annual exhibitions. Juries in painting and sculpture, composed of PAFA faculty and invited artists, evaluated hundreds (and later thousands) of submissions and chose those for exhibition. The Painters' Jury of Selection also chose the medal winners in painting. An artist could be awarded a Temple medal only once. Sometimes the medal-winning painting was purchased for PAFA's permanent collection.

The process for the first Temple Medal was a fiasco. To encourage American historical painting, PAFA added a $3,000 cash bonus to the 1883 gold medal if it went to a historical work. But the art jury could not agree on a gold medal recipient. A silver medal would have been awarded to William B. T. Trego for The March to Valley Forge, but he refused to accept it. Trego argued that if only one Temple medal was awarded it should be a gold, not a silver (which implied second place). Trego sued PAFA to be named the gold medal winner and claim the cash bonus. After losing in a Philadelphia court, he took his appeal to the Pennsylvania Supreme Court, which concurred with the lower court's ruling that PAFA's art jury had the right to issue awards as it saw fit. After 1883, no cash prizes accompanied Temple medals.

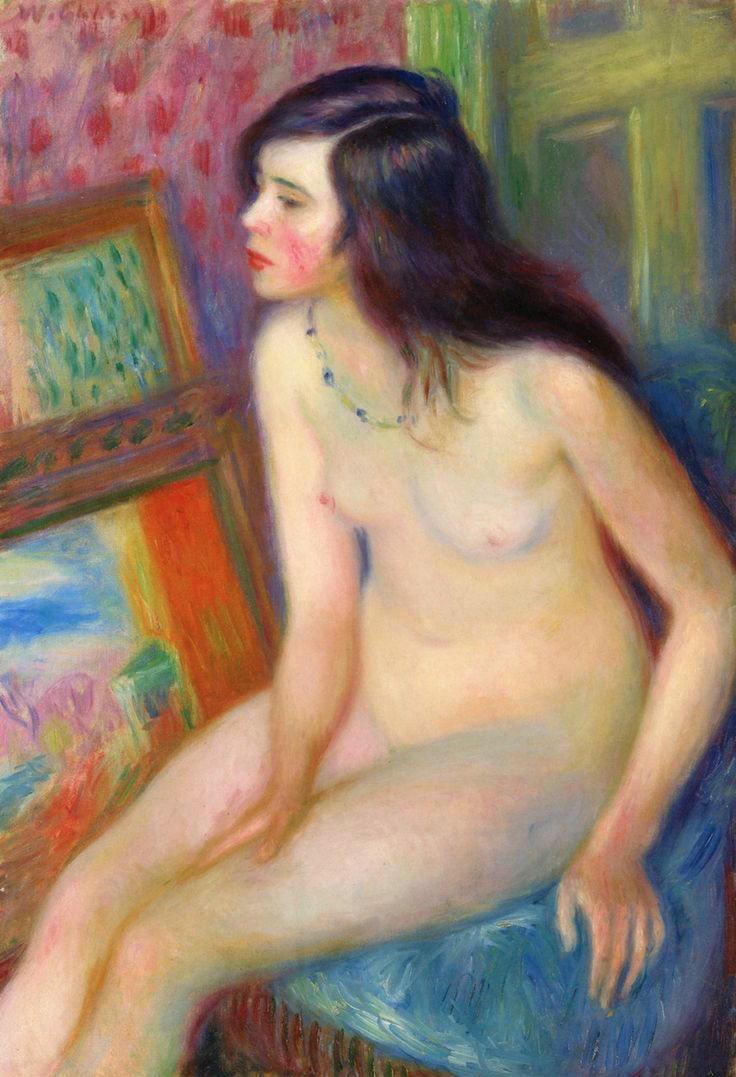
Temple Gold Medal Nude (1924) by William Glackens. Winner of the 1924 Temple Gold Medal.

From 1884 to 1889, a gold medal was awarded for the best figure painting and a silver medal for the best landscape or marine painting. But the jury ignored the rules in 1890, awarding a landscape-with-cattle painting the gold medal. (Note: "[T]hese cattle pictures of Mr. Howe are admirable, and they are certainly among the most satisfying things exhibited here, but the gold medal was offered for 'the best figure picture by an American artist,' and these are not figure pictures at all, and it is hard to avoid the conclusion that the committee has made another mistake in awarding this medal in this way." — L. W. M. [Leslie W. Miller]) In 1891 and 1892, a gold medal was awarded for the best painting regardless of subject, and a silver for the second-best. No second-place medals were awarded after 1892. From 1893 to 1899, two gold medals were awarded each year. Beginning in 1900, a single gold medal was awarded for the best painting in PAFA's annual exhibition regardless of subject.

Famously, Thomas Eakins, who had been forced to resign as director of PAFA's school in 1886, accepted his 1904 award for Archbishop William Henry Elder by declaring, ”I think you’ve got a heap of impudence to give me a medal." He then rode off on a bicycle to the Philadelphia Mint, where he sold the gold medal for its melt-down value.

William Glackens wryly changed the name of the figure painting that won him the 1924 award from Nude to Temple Gold Medal Nude.

By the 1930s, PAFA's annual exhibitions had acquired a reputation for being parochial and nepotistic. (Note: Art columnist Jane Richter complained that more than 60% of the 258 paintings in the 1937 exhibition had been by members of the selection jury or by invited artists. While acknowledging the value of having "name" artists, she argued that PAFA needed to choose: make future exhibitions truly open-to-all or make them by-invitation-only.) With the costs of transporting and insuring the works, they were also expensive. Beginning in 1954, PAFA's exhibitions became bi-annual. The last Temple Gold Medal was awarded to Helen Frankenthaler in 1968. Beginning in 1969, the annual exhibitions were dedicated exclusively to work by students in PAFA's school.

== List of recipients ==
Year	Artist	Image	Work	Collection	Notes	Ref(s)
1883 (silver)	William B. T. Trego		The March to Valley Forge	Museum of the American Revolution, Philadelphia, Pennsylvania	Trego refused the silver medal.	
1884	George W. Maynard		Portrait of Francis Davis Millet (Dressed as a War Correspondent)	National Portrait Gallery, Smithsonian		
1884 (silver)	Thomas Hill		Yosemite Valley: View from Bridal Veil Meadow		Ex collection: Pennsylvania Academy of the Fine Arts; Deaccessioned 1898; Auctioned at Bonham's San Francisco, November 20, 2011; Sold for $2,500.	
1885	Charles Sprague Pearce		Peines de Coeur (Troubles of the Heart)	Virginia Museum of Fine Arts	Exhibited: 1885 Paris Salon	
1885 (silver)	William Trost Richards		Old Ocean's Gray and Melancholy Waste	Pennsylvania Academy of the Fine Arts	PAFA board member (later president) Edward Hornor Coates bought the painting from the exhibition. His widow, poet Florence Earle Coates, donated it to PAFA in 1923. It may have been the inspiration for her 1909 poem, "Mid-Ocean."	
1886	No exhibition					
1887	Clifford Prevost Grayson		A Fisherman's Family		Exhibited: 1885 Paris Salon; Ex collection: Pennsylvania Academy of the Fine Arts; Deaccessioned 1898	
1887 (silver)	T. Alexander Harrison		The Wave	Pennsylvania Academy of the Fine Arts	Exhibited: 1885 Paris Salon	
1888	Charles Stanley Reinhart		Washed Ashore	Corcoran Gallery of Art	Honorable Mention: 1887 Paris Salon; Vincent van Gogh was an admirer of the painting. (Note: "In Harper’s Weekly I found an illustration by Reinhart, by far the best I’ve seen by him up to now, Washed Ashore. A body has been washed up, a man is kneeling beside it to see who it is, a few fishermen and women give information about the shipwreck victim to a gendarme. So it looks somewhat like Victim of a Shipwreck that you have, but the drawing by R. has something of [Félix] Régamey, for example. It’s a very fine print." — Vincent van Gogh.)	
1888 (silver)	Howard Russell Butler		Les ramasseurs de varech (The Seaweed Gatherers)	Smithsonian American Art Museum	Honorable Mention: 1886 Paris Salon	
1889	Anna Elizabeth Klumpke		In the Wash House	Pennsylvania Academy of the Fine Arts	Exhibited: 1888 Paris Salon; First woman awarded a Temple Gold Medal.	
1889 (silver)	Arthur Parton		Winter on the Hudson		Honorable Mention: 1889 Paris Exposition	
1890	William Henry Howe		Return of the Herd at Evening, Uplands of Normandy		Exhibited: 1887 Paris Salon Howe in his Paris studio with Return of the Herd at Evening:	
1890 (silver)	Edward Emerson Simmons		St. Ives's Bay, Cornwall at Sunset, Looking East		Ex collection: Mariners' Museum, Newport News, Virginia	
1891; 1st place	Abbott H. Thayer		Winged Figure	Art Institute of Chicago		
1891 (silver); 2nd place	Kenyon Cox		Portrait of a Lady (The Artist's Wife)	Smithsonian American Art Museum	One of 13 works in Cox's medal-winning group at the 1893 World's Columbian Exposition.	
1892; 1st place	Henry S. Bisbing		On the River Shore, Holland		Bronze Medal: 1889 Exposition Universelle, Paris; One of 3 works in Bisbing's medal-winning group at the 1893 World's Columbian Exposition.	
1892 (silver); 2nd place	George Inness		Autumn Oaks	Panhandle-Plains Historical Museum, Canyon, Texas		
1893	No exhibition					
1894	John Singer Sargent		Portrait of Ellen Terry as Lady MacBeth	Tate Britain		
1894	James Abbott McNeill Whistler		Arrangement in Black: Lady in the Yellow Buskin (Lady Archibald Campbell)	Philadelphia Museum of Art		
1895	Edmund C. Tarbell		Arrangement in Pink and Gray (Afternoon Tea)	Worcester Art Museum		
1895	John H. Twachtman		Sailing in the Mist	Pennsylvania Academy of the Fine Arts	Twachtman painted this following the death of his 8-year-old daughter Elsie.	
1896	Gari Melchers		The Family		A Melchers painting of this title is in the Old National Gallery in Berlin, Germany.	
1896	John Humphreys Johnston		Le Domino Rose	Museum of Fine Arts, Boston		
1897	John White Alexander		Isabella and the Pot of Basil	Museum of Fine Arts, Boston		
1897	George de Forest Brush		Mother and Child	Pennsylvania Academy of the Fine Arts		
1898	Edward Francis Rook		Pearl Clouds, Moonlight	Cincinnati Art Museum		
1898	Wilton Lockwood		The Violinist (Otto Roth)	Skibo Castle, Dornoch, Scotland	3rd Prize: 1898 Carnegie Institute; Owned by Andrew Carnegie in 1907.	
1899	Childe Hassam		Pont Royal, Paris	Cincinnati Art Museum		
1899	Joseph de Camp		Woman Drying Her Hair	Cincinnati Art Museum		
1900	Cecilia Beaux		Mother and Daughter (Mrs. Clement Griscom and Frances C. Griscom)	Pennsylvania Academy of the Fine Arts	Second woman awarded a Temple Gold Medal. 1st Prize: 1899 Carnegie Institute; Gold Medal: 1900 Paris Exposition	
1901	William Merritt Chase		Portrait of a Lady with a Rose (Miss M. S. Lukens)	Private collection		
1902	Winslow Homer		A Northeaster	Metropolitan Museum of Art		
1903	Edward Redfield	under copyright until 2035	A Winter Evening	Private collection	Appraised on Antiques Roadshow, air date: September 22, 2014.	
1904	Thomas Eakins		Archbishop William Henry Elder	Cincinnati Art Museum		
1905	J. Alden Weir		The Green Bodice	Metropolitan Museum of Art		
1906	Eugene Paul Ullman		Portrait of Madame Fisher	Indianapolis Museum of Art		
1907	Willard L. Metcalf		The Golden Screen	Private collection		
1908	Frank Weston Benson		Portrait of My Daughters	Worcester Art Museum		
1909	Frederic Porter Vinton		Portrait of Carroll D. Wright, President of Clark College	Clark University, Worcester, Massachusetts		
1910	Howard Gardiner Cushing		Portrait of the Artist's Wife (Ethel Cochrane Cushing)			
1911	Richard E. Miller		The Chinese Statuette	St. Louis Art Museum		
1912	Emil Carlsen		The Open Sea	Addison Gallery of American Art		
1913	Frederick Frieseke		Youth			
1914	W. Elmer Schofield		The Hill Country	Woodmere Art Museum, Chestnut Hill, Philadelphia		
1915	Charles Webster Hawthorne		Provincetown Fisherman	Indianapolis Museum of Art		
1916	Joseph Thurman Pearson Jr.		On the Valley		Auctioned at Sloan's, North Bethesda, Maryland, September 27, 1981; sold for $1,250.	
1917	George Bellows		A Day in June	Detroit Institute of Arts		
1918	George Luks		Houston Street	St. Louis Art Museum		
1919	Daniel Garber	under copyright until 2028	The Orchard Window	Philadelphia Museum of Art		
1920	Ernest Lawson		Ice-Bound Falls	Art Institute of Chicago		
1921	Leopold Seyffert	under copyright until 2026	Lacquer Screen (The Model)	Pennsylvania Academy of the Fine Arts		
1922	William Langson Lathrop		October Evening			
1923	Walter Ufer		Sleep	National Cowboy & Western Heritage Museum, Oklahoma City, Oklahoma		
1924	William Glackens		Temple Gold Medal Nude	Private collection	Auctioned at Sotheby's New York, May 19, 2011; sold for $254,500.	
1925	Clifford Addams		Washington Square, New York		Ex coll: Pennsylvania Academy of the Fine Arts	
1926	Hayley Lever	under copyright until 2028	The Harbor			
1927	Leon Kroll	under copyright until 2044	My Wife's Family	University of Virginia Art Museum		
1928	James Ormsbee Chapin	under copyright until 2045	George Marvin and His Daughter Edith	Dallas Museum of Art		
1929	Robert Henri		The Wee Woman			
1930	Arthur B. Carles	under copyright until 2022	Still Life			
1931	Alexander Brook	under copyright until 2050	The Intruder		The intruder in the still life is a whimsical mouse.	
1932	Paul Bartlett	under copyright until 2035	The Sand Barge			
1933	S. Walter Norris	under copyright until 2031	Pool at Ilk		"S. Walter Norris's Pool at Ilk does not rest content with simply re-exploring the Seurat mysteries."	
1934	Yasuo Kuniyoshi		Fruit on Table (1932)	Sheldon Museum of Art, University of Nebraska, Lincoln		
1935	Edward Hopper	under copyright until 2037	Mrs. Scott's House	Maier Museum of Art, Randolph College, Lynchburg, Virginia		
1936	Paul Starrett Sample	under copyright until 2044	Miners Resting	Sheldon Museum of Art, University of Nebraska, Lincoln		
1937	Henry Lee McFee		Sleeping Black Girl	Los Angeles County Museum of Art		
1938	Eugene Speicher	under copyright until 2032	Marianna	Whitney Museum of American Art	A seated woman wearing a blue headscarf and holding a flower	
1939	Henry McCarter		The Pinnacle		A hilltop shrouded in clouds	
1940	Morris Kantor	under copyright until 2044	Lighthouse (Lighthouse, Cape Cod)	Pennsylvania Academy of the Fine Arts		
1941	Max Weber	under copyright until 2031	Reading	Hirshhorn Museum and Sculpture Garden		
1942	Ivan Albright	under copyright until 2053	That Which I Should Have Done I Did Not Do (The Door)	Art Institute of Chicago		
1943	Raphael Soyer	under copyright until 2057	Waiting Room (Railroad Station Waiting Room)	Corcoran Gallery of Art		
1944	Franklin C. Watkins	under copyright until 2042	Portrait of Thomas Raeburn White	Cleveland Museum of Art		
1945	Abraham Rattner	under copyright until 2048	Kiosk	Pennsylvania Academy of the Fine Arts		
1946	Gregorio Prestopino	under copyright until 2054	Death of Snappy Collins	Walker Art Center, Minneapolis, Minnesota	8 men huddled around a dead or dying man	
1947	Arthur Osver	under copyright until 2076	The Majestic Tenement	Pennsylvania Academy of the Fine Arts		
1948	Eugene Ludins	under copyright until 2066	The Valley	Woodstock Artists Association and Museum		
1949	Henry Koerner	under copyright until 2061	Junkyard	Carnegie Museum of Art, Pittsburgh, Pennsylvania		
1950	Harvey Dinnerstein	under copyright still alive	Noah Wolf	Pennsylvania Academy of the Fine Arts		
1951	William Congdon	under copyright until 2068	Venice #2			
1952	O. Louis Guglielmi	under copyright until 2026	New York 21	Federal Reserve Art Collection, Washington, D.C.	In 2010, this hung in the office of then-Fed Chairman Ben Bernanke.	
1953	Rico Lebrun	under copyright until 2034	Figures on the Cross with Lantern			
1954	John Marin (posthumous)	under copyright until 2023	The Jersey Hills			
1955	Student exhibition					
1956	Ben Shahn	under copyright until 2039	Chicago (Allegory)	Modern Art Museum of Fort Worth	Depicts Chicago's 1947 Hickman tenement fire, with the flames forming into a mythical beast.	
1957	Student exhibition					
1958	Philip Evergood	under copyright until 2043	Threshold to Success	Pennsylvania Academy of the Fine Arts		
1959	Student exhibition					
1960	Lee Gatch	under copyright until 2038	Fish Market	Newark Museum		
1961	Student exhibition					
1962	Julian E. Levi	under copyright until 2052	Orpheus in the Studio	Pennsylvania Academy of the Fine Arts		
1963	Student exhibition					
1964	Stuart Davis	under copyright until 2034	Letter and His Ecol	Pennsylvania Academy of the Fine Arts		
1965	Student exhibition					
1966	George L.K. Morris	under copyright until 2045	Elegy on the Pennsylvania Station, No. 1	Solomon R. Guggenheim Museum		
1967	Student exhibition					
1968	Helen Frankenthaler	under copyright until 2081	Tobacco Landscape		Third woman awarded a Temple Gold Medal. Last Temple Gold Medal awarded.	

== See also ==
- Beck Gold Medal
- Mary Smith Prize
- Widener Gold Medal
