= Paul Bartlett (painter) =

American painter (1881–1965)

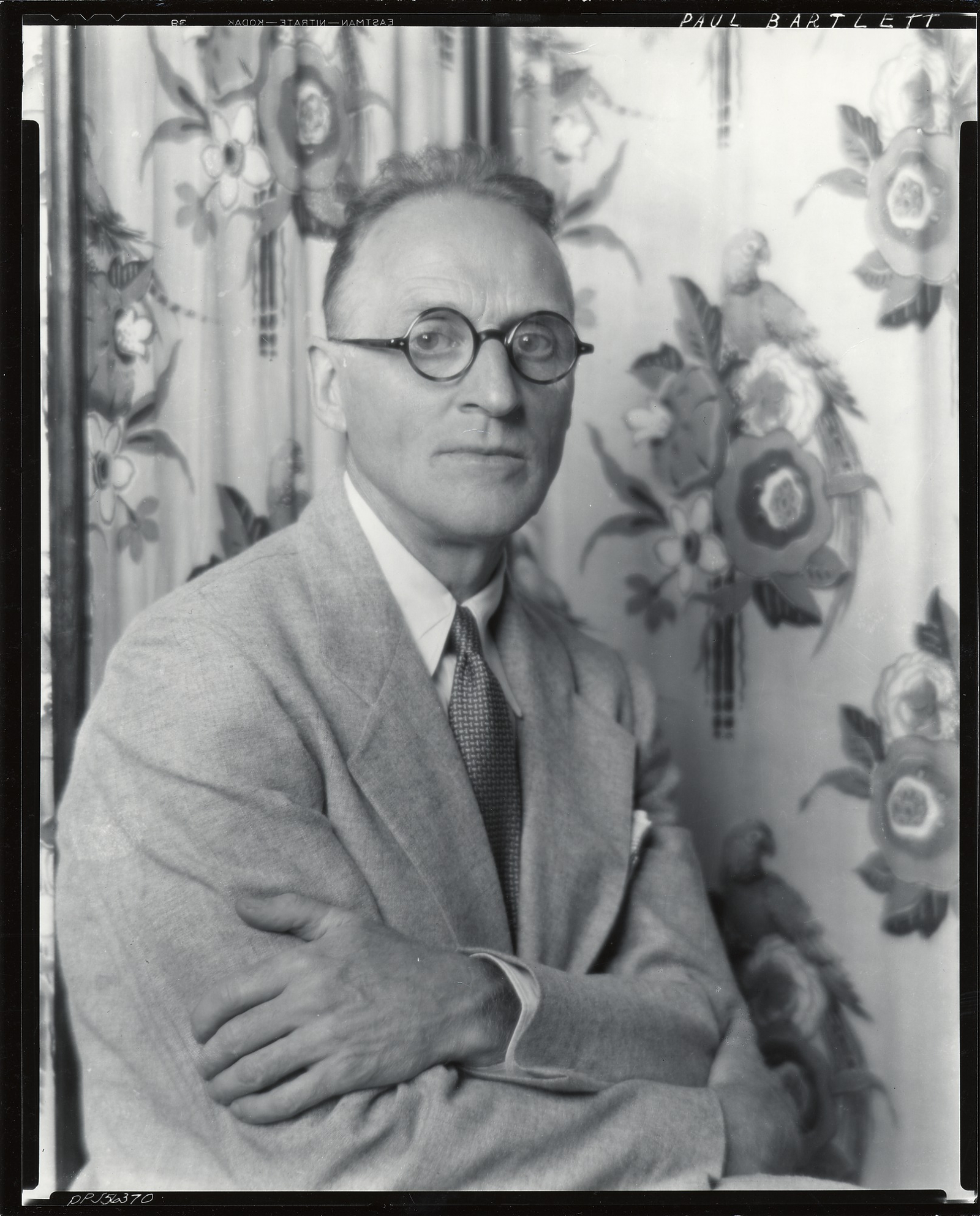
Paul Bartlett, circa 1940s

Paul Bartlett (July 8, 1881 – April 3, 1965) was an American landscape painter, art teacher, and poet.

A descendant of New Hampshire Founding Father Josiah Bartlett, he was born and grew up in Taunton, Massachusetts. He attended Phillips Exeter Academy and Harvard University, where he was a member of the Signet Society. He was a writer and cartoonist for The Harvard Lampoon, and its president, 1901–02. He studied at the School of the Art Institute of Chicago, and in France. Prior to World War I, he spent a year in St. Petersburg, Russia, as a vice-consul at the United States consulate.

Bartlett returned to Chicago, where he worked as an illustrator. He married Lina H. Owlsey, and the couple moved to New York City in 1921, and divorced about 1930. He exhibited at the Pennsylvania Academy of the Fine Arts in Philadelphia during the 1920s and 1930s. PAFA awarded him its 1932 Temple Gold Medal for The Sand Barge.

He moved to Charlotte, North Carolina in 1944, and subsequently taught at the Mint Museum of Art, the Burton Institute, Guilford College, and other schools. He married the English painter Kathleen Mary Booker Bain (1903–1993) in 1945, and they moved to Greensboro, North Carolina in 1959.

He published two books of poetry: Moods and Memories in 1957, and And What of Spring? in 1962.

The Mint Museum organized a one-man show of his paintings: Paul Bartlett Retrospective Exhibition, September 2 – October 27, 1959. After his death, the museum hosted a memorial exhibition. One of his landscapes is in the collection of the Louvre in Paris.

Bartlett died at Greensboro in 1965. His widow donated his papers to the Smithsonian Institution.
