= Conservation-restoration of The Gross Clinic =

Ongoing treatment of an 1875 painting

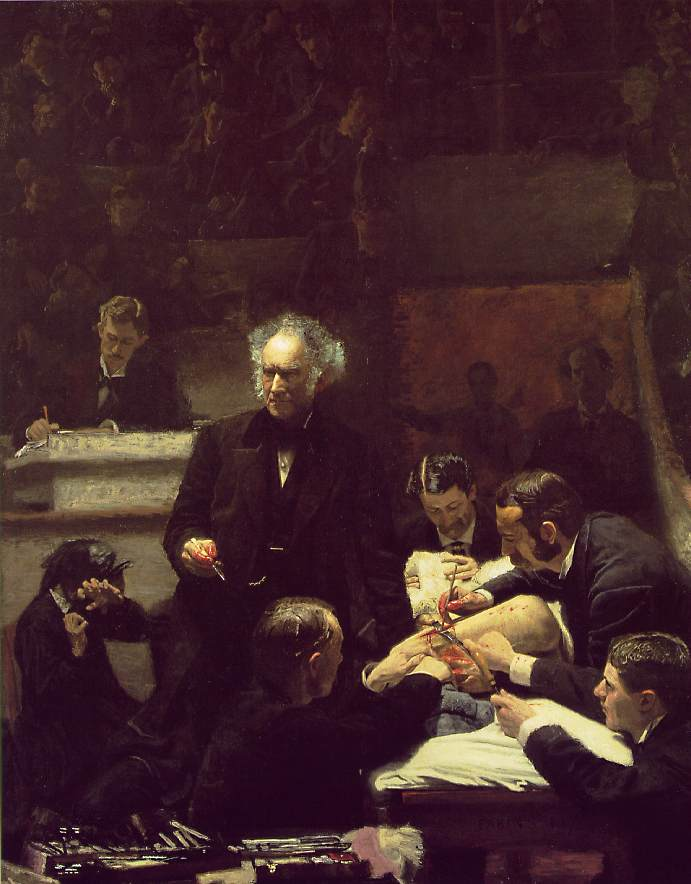
Prior to the 2010 restoration

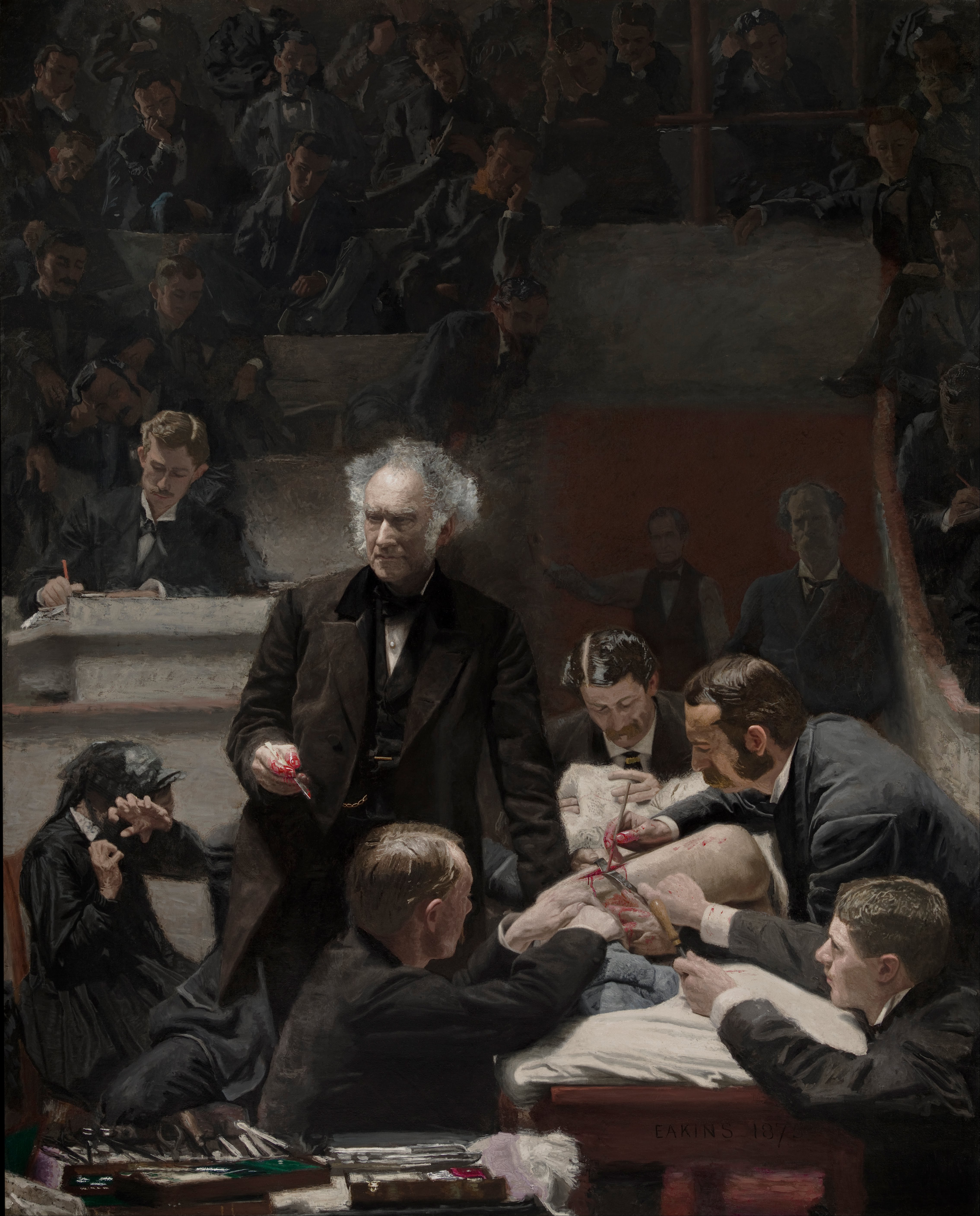
After the 2010 restoration

The Gross Clinic, an 1875 oil-on-canvas painting by the American painter Thomas Eakins, has received conservation-restoration treatments throughout the 20th and 21st centuries. These treatments are a testament to the changing methodologies undertaken in the field of paintings conservation.

The painting was subject to several conservation-restoration treatments both prior to Eakins' death and in the decades following, which altered both the structural integrity of the painting as well as its surface composition. Emergency treatment was undertaken in 1960 and 1961 by Theodor Siegel, conservator at the Philadelphia Museum of Art, to correct damage from previous restorations. The most recent treatment was performed in 2010 by conservators at the Philadelphia Museum of Art to correct problems resulting from the 1961 restoration as well as the previous restorations.

== Description ==
The Gross Clinic is painted in oil on canvas, and is 240 cm × 200 cm (8 ft × 6.5 ft). It portrays surgeon Dr. Samuel D. Gross, the first chief of surgery at Jefferson Medical College, performing surgery on a young man for osteomyelitis of the femur in the surgical amphitheater on the top floor of Jefferson's Ely Building in the company of multiple doctors and medical students. Chief of Clinic Dr. James M. Barton can be seen standing over the patient, probing the incision. Junior assistant Dr. Charles S. Briggs, seen below Gross, is holding the patient's legs while Dr. Daniel M. Appel, seen bottom right, uses a retractor to hold open the incision. The anesthetist, Dr. W. Joseph Hearn, sits at the head of the operating table, holding a chloroform soaked rag over the patient's face. The clinic's clerk, Dr. Franklin West, records the surgery at a desk behind Gross. Gross' son Dr. Samuel W. Gross and orderly Hughey O'Donnell can be seen standing in the hall leading out of the amphitheater. A woman, possibly the patient's mother, can be seen recoiling at the bottom left. A self-portrait of Eakins himself can be seen on the right side of the painting, in the front of the theater, taking notes.

== History ==
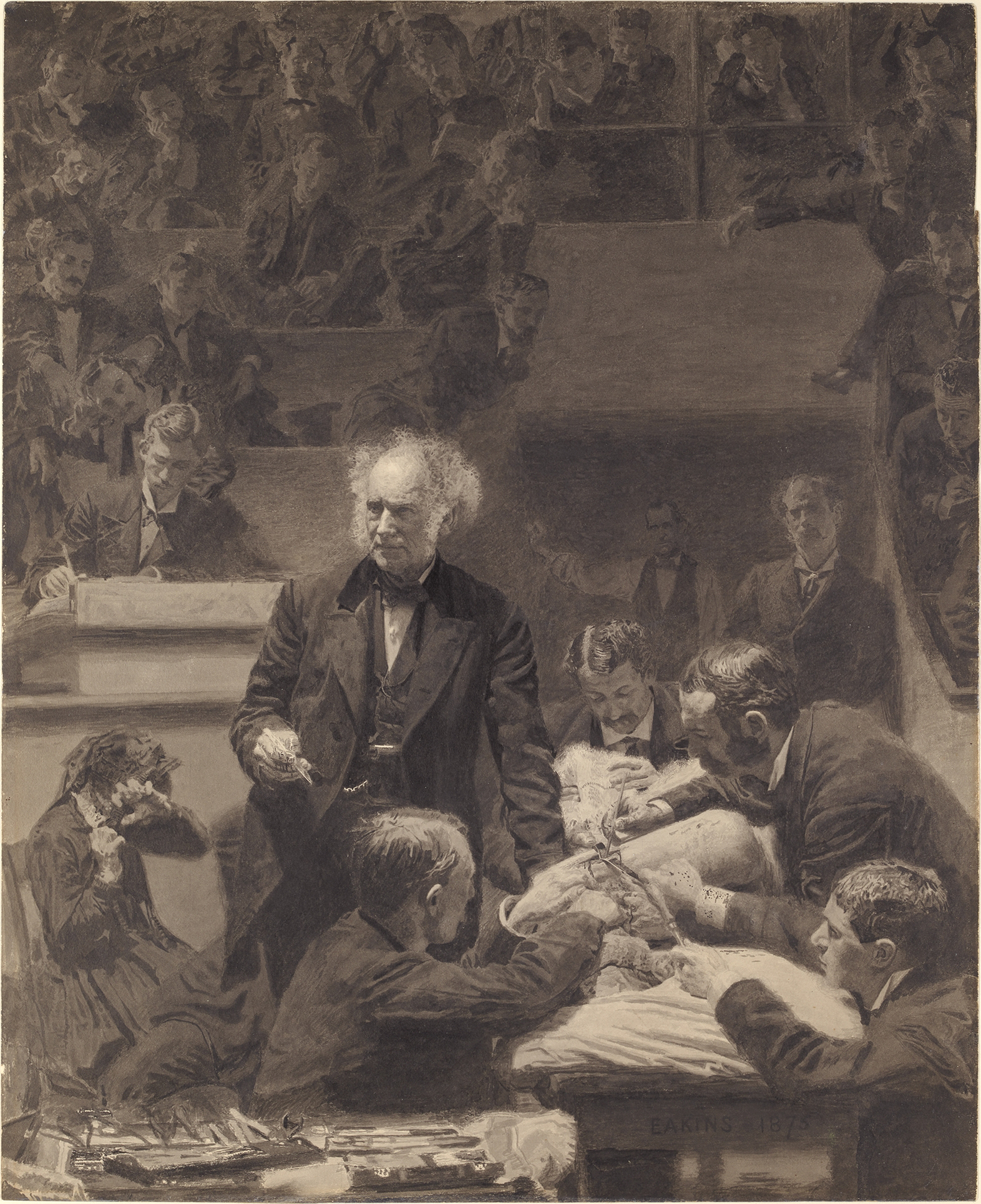
1875–1876 India ink and watercolor reproduction by Thomas Eakins, Metropolitan Museum of Art

Work on the painting likely began sometime in April 1875, as evidenced by a letter from Eakins to his friend Earl Shinn in which he declares, "What elates me more is that I have just got a new picture blocked in and it is very far better than anything I have ever done." Work on the painting continued throughout summer of 1875, with Eakins holding multiple sessions with Dr. Gross at his home at 1729 Mount Vernon St. to produce studies for the final work. The work was likely finished by Christmas of 1875, evidenced by the gift of a portrait sketch of author and friend Robert C.V. Meyers, who modeled for the painting.

Eakins submitted the painting for display at Memorial Hall during the 1876 Centennial Exhibition in Philadelphia, but was rejected by Selecting Committee, who claimed there was inadequate space to display the painting. However, it was suggested by a correspondent of New York's Medical Record and by William Clark in the Philadelphia Evening Telegraph that the painting's graphic nature caused several members of the jury to feel faint. The painting was instead displayed at the model ward of the U.S. Army Post Hospital, a replica created for the Centennial.

In February 1878 the painting was purchased by Alumni Association of Jefferson Medical College for $200.

=== Acquisition by The Philadelphia Museum of Art and Pennsylvania Academy of the Fine Arts ===
On November 11, 2006, it was announced that the board of Thomas Jefferson University (formerly Jefferson Medical College) voted to sell the painting to the National Gallery of Art in Washington, D.C., and to Wal-Mart heiress Alice Walton's planned Crystal Bridges Museum of American Art in Bentonville, Arkansas, for a record $68 million.

Due to the painting's connections to Philadelphia, portraying Philadelphians painted in a Philadelphia college by a Philadelphia painter, the announcement of the impending sale caused an uproar. Anne d’Harnoncourt, director of the Philadelphia Museum of Art, remarked that "It’s a painting that really belongs in Philadelphia – his presence still resonates here." Protests against the sale held in November and December 2006 were organized by Philadelphia artists Stanley Bielen, Charles Cushing, and Patrick Connors. Philadelphia mayor John F. Street threatened to declare the painting a historic landmark, possibly tying up the sale in court.

The university gave local museums and government agencies the chance to match the $68 million sale price and keep the painting in Philadelphia by December 26, 2006. In a joint effort by the Philadelphia Museum of Art and the Pennsylvania Academy of the Fine Arts, the funds were raised in 45 days through thousands of donations with the remaining amount loaned by Wachovia Bank. The remainder of the funding was completed in 2008 by the Philadelphia Museum of Art's sale of Cowboy Singing and two oil sketches of Cowboys in the Badlands and the Pennsylvania Academy of the Fine Arts sale of The Cello Player, all works by Eakins.

== Conservation-restoration treatments ==
=== 1915 ===
The first recorded conservation-restoration treatment to The Gross Clinic took place sometime in 1915 by restorer T. H. Stevenson at the behest of Jefferson Medical College. The canvas on which The Gross Clinic was painted had become weak and brittle and was lined with a new piece of linen. A 1916 issue of The Jeffersonian noted that Stevenson cleaned and treated the painting.

=== 1917–1925 ===
At some point between 1917 and 1925 a treatment of the painting took place that dramatically altered the composition of the painting. It is not known who worked on the painting or when. A comparison of a photograph of the painting taken in October 1917 for the Loan Exhibition of the Works of Thomas Eakins at the Metropolitan Museum of Art and a reproduction of the painting that appeared as the frontispiece of Jefferson Medical College's 1925 yearbook show major differences in the relative tones of the painting, indicating a major restoration in which paint was removed. The hall leading out of the amphitheater was considerably lighter; Dr. Samuel W. Gross and orderly Hughey O'Donnell originally appeared lighter than the background. The majority of the painting now had a considerably redder tone.

Thomas Eakins' widow, Susan Macdowell Eakins, upon seeing the 1925 reproduction and thinking the changes had been made for the reproduction rather than to the painting itself, strongly objected to its release. A letter from Eakins to Jefferson Medical College Dean Ross V. Patterson details her frustrations:

The photograph [the color reproduction] presents an operation being done by Dr. Gross under a fancy red light which fills the Clinic Room. The oil painting presents an operation being done by Dr. Gross in daylight. I have been in the Clinic Room as it was in Dr. Gross’s time, also am quite certain at this present time, when artificial lights are the fashion, fancy lights would not be permitted on the serious performances of a Clinic.

— Susan Eakins

=== 1940 ===
The next recorded treatment of the painting took place in 1940 was by Philadelphia restorer Hannah Mee Horner, at the behest of Jefferson Medical College. Hearing of the college's plans for restoring the painting, Eakins' student Charles Bregler, who frequently treated multiple Eakins paintings at Susan Eakins' request, attempted to intervene but was rebuffed. Horner removed the linen lining attached by Stevenson in 1915 and replaced it with two, 4-by-6 1/2-foot pieces of plywood which were butted in the center and nailed to a wooden framework. The painting was then attached using carpenter's glue. Records also indicate that Horner also cleaned and restored the painting.

=== 1960–1961 ===
The results of the 1940 treatment proved to be disastrous and put the painting in serious need of new treatment. In the spring of 1960 conservator Theodor Siegl of the Philadelphia Museum of Art, the first with professional training and credentials to treat the painting, cleaned and restored the painting at Jefferson's request. Varnish, applied by Horner, had become yellowed and darkened while a significant accumulations of grime also built up on the surface. Siegl used a combination of solvents to remove the grime and varnish, removed buildup of filling putty used by previous restorers, and retouched areas that had been torn or distorted. Siegl finally applied a layer of varnish and made minor retouchings.

In 1961 Jefferson again requested Siegl examine the painting prior to its inclusion in an Eakins retrospective that would travel from the National Gallery of Art to the Art Institute of Chicago and finally end in Philadelphia. Siegl realized that the structure of the painting was in extreme danger from Horner's 1940 treatment. The plywood attached to the back of the painting had begun to warp, creating a crease in the middle of the painting which could have torn it in half. The nails in the plywood also began to move forward, creating bumps in the painting.

Siegl's conservation-restoration of the painting moved forward in the summer of 1961. Due to the painting's large size, no table in the conservation department could accommodate the painting, thus a custom working platform with a built in thermostat was created. To protect the painting in the course of removing the plywood the surface of the painting was covered with tissue paper and strips of muslin. The framework was the first part of the 1940 treatment to be removed, revealing over 500 nails which had been causing a large portion of the damage to the painting's surface. A planer, attached to an electric power saw, was used to remove most of the plywood, with the remainder being removed by hand. The carpenter's glue used in the 1940 was then removed. A new linen lining was attached to the canvas, which was then attached to a new stretcher framework. A new, easily removable varnish was used on the painting's surface.

=== 2010 ===
Following the purchase of The Gross Clinic by the Philadelphia Museum of Art and the Pennsylvania Academy of the Fine Arts in 2007 and after considerable research and discussion, the decision was made to conserve and restore the painting once more. The ultimate goal of the treatment was to both correct damage done by earlier treatments and restore the tones of the paint to reflect Eakins' original intentions, which was made possible by extensive research on Eakins' technique not available to earlier conservators. This treatment was performed by conservators Mark Tucker, Allen Kosanovich, and Terry Lignelli.

The first step concerned the removal of the varnish applied by Siegl in 1961, a synthetic resin called poly(n-butyl methacrylate), which was prone to discoloration and loss of solubility, making it more difficult to remove as time went on. Taking place over the course of several weeks, the removal of this varnish allowed conservators to view what was left of Eakins' original paint and what had been retouched by earlier treatments. A new, synthetic resin varnish, MS2A, was applied to the surface which both evenly saturated the colors of the painting while isolating the original paint from the retouching, should it need to be removed in the future.

An 1875–1876 india ink and watercolor reproduction created by Eakins, the 1917 photograph, and 1925 reproduction were used as a guide for conservators to retouch the painting. The conservators used paints made of lightfast pigments ground in a colorless synthetic resin to retouch the painting. Smaller areas where paint had been flaked away were the first priority, followed by areas where large swaths of colors and tones had been altered. The area of the amphitheater's opening, in which a dark glaze had been removed, was restored to more closely resemble the small amounts of dark paint that remained as well as the 1917 photograph. Details of the many characters in the painting had been obscured due to earlier aggressive cleanings. The faces of orderly Hughey O'Donnell, Dr. Gross' son Dr. Samuel W. Gross, and Eakins were all restored to their original detail seen in the 1917 photograph.

Following the completion of the treatment an exhibition, An Eakins Masterpiece Restored: Seeing The Gross Clinic Anew, was held between July 23, 2010, and January 9, 2011, at the Philadelphia Museum of Art.

== Discoveries ==
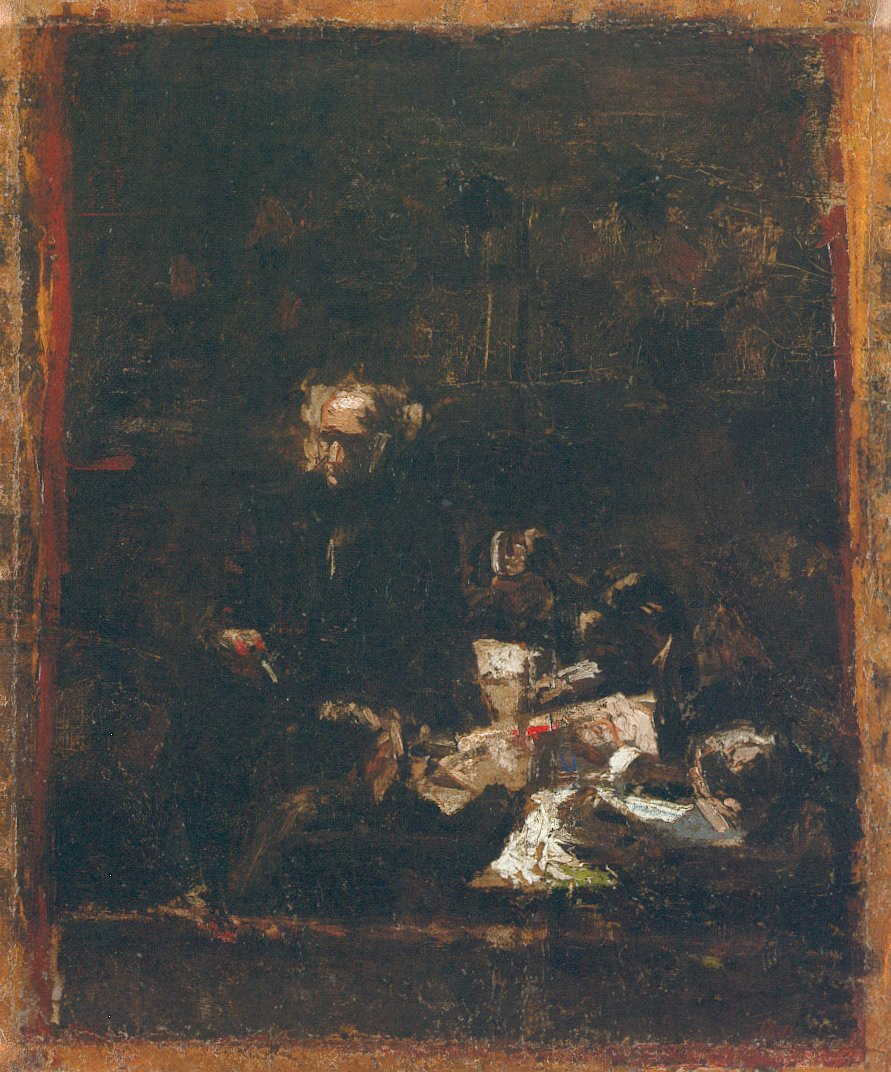
Sketch for The Gross Clinic

The use of x-radiography and infrared reflectography prior to the 2010 treatment revealed a wealth of information about Eakins' technique and the creation of The Gross Clinic.

=== Eakins' technique ===
An x-radiograph of the painting revealed a heavy build-up of paint behind the heads of the principal characters. Rather than building upon dark areas with light paint, as was the convention at the time of the paintings creation, the x-radiograph revealed that Eakins instead built on light areas with dark paint. The characters featured in the periphery of the painting were not significantly built up in this fashion and were instead painted thinly.

=== Composition of The Gross Clinic ===
Significant changes in the composition of the painting before the final image were revealed using x-radiography. The probe in the hands of Dr. James Barton was initially longer but shortened in the final composition. The clinic's clerk, Dr. Franklin West, was initially seen taking his notes at a lower position but was moved up for the final composition. Dr. Daniel M. Appel, seen bottom right, is shown in the sketch looking more to the right but in the final composition looking more to the left, showing more of his profile. In the final composition his arm was also moved slightly down, showing the patient's buttocks. X-radiography also revealed an initial stripe across the bottom of the painting, likely intended to serve as the wall circling the seats of the amphitheater, which was replaced with a view under the surgeon's table in the final composition.

== An Eakins Masterpiece Restored: Seeing The Gross Clinic Anew ==
Following the completion of the 2010 conservation treatment, the Philadelphia Museum of Art opened the exhibition "An Eakins Masterpiece Restored: Seeing The Gross Clinic Anew", which ran from July 3, 2010, to January 9, 2011. The theme of the exhibition was "Then and Now", an homage to the famed and nearly two-hour-long lecture by Dr. Samuel D. Gross, Then and Now: Advances in Medical Science in the Past Forty Years: a Discourse Introductory to the Forty-third Course of Lectures in the Jefferson Medical College of Philadelphia. The first gallery was in the style of a salon, with The Gross Clinic presented in the middle, flanked by The Agnew Clinic and Professor Benjamin Howard Rand on the left and right, respectively. The second gallery contained information regarding the conservation history of the painting, including the findings from the research undertaken prior to the conservation, the damage caused by the early restorations, and the 2010 treatment which restored the painting. The final gallery presented a documentary film which told the story of the paintings acquisition in 2007 and subsequent conservation. Visitors were then directed to revisit The Gross Clinic a second time, having contextualized its treatment.

== See also ==
- List of works by Thomas Eakins
