= Mert =

Mert or MERT may refer to:

== People ==
- Mert (given name), a Turkish masculine given name and a nickname
- Mert (surname)

== MERT ==
- Medical Emergency Response Team, British Armed Forces designation for in-theatre aeromedical evacuation units
- Multi-Environment Real-Time, Unix-based hybrid time-sharing and real-time operating system
- Penn MERT, a student-run volunteer emergency medical services organization of the University of Pennsylvania

== Other uses ==
- Mert River, Turkey
- Mert., standard botanical author abbreviation for Franz Carl Mertens

== See also ==
- Meret, Egyptian goddess
