= Penn MERT =

University of Pennsylvania student emergency medical organization

Penn Medical Emergency Response Team (Penn MERT)
- Motto: "More than EMS"
- Established: 2006
- Headquarters: Philadelphia, Pennsylvania
- Jurisdiction: The University of Pennsylvania's Public Safety Patrol Zone.
- Volunteers: 70 (as of February 2023)
- BLS or ALS: BLS Quick Response (no transport)
- Ambulances: 0
- Chief: Raymond Tabak
- Responses: approximately 500/year
- Website: www.pennmert.org

The Penn Medical Emergency Response Team (MERT) is the University of Pennsylvania's student-run volunteer emergency medical services organization, providing care to students, faculty, staff and community members. MERT's primary responsibility is to provide quick-response emergency medical care before Philadelphia Fire Department paramedic units are available to provide patient transport. The secondary purpose of MERT is to provide education to the Penn community, specifically CPR training, First Aid training, and alcohol education.

== History ==
MERT was founded in 2006 by four students at the University of Pennsylvania. After witnessing a delayed medical response to an emergency in the quad, Andrew Mener proposed the establishment of an on-campus EMS organization. MERT acquired a membership of 50 who prepared for operations by undergoing bicycle safety training through the International Police Mountain Biking Association's standards. MERT's first operational period was Penn's Spring Fling weekend in 2006, where MERT responded to 22 medical calls. This demonstration persuaded university administrators to permit a year-long pilot program. The organization was subsequently funded by the university's vice provost for university life, the university's Department of Public Safety, Fox Leadership, and the Undergraduate Assembly.

MERT's operational hours at its initiation were weekends only, from Thursday night through Sunday. Starting in the fall of 2006, MERT extended its service to 7 nights per week during each academic semester.

In 2010, MERT relocated from its headquarters in Sansom Place East, a primarily graduate residence building, to the Quad, which mainly houses freshmen. This relocation was due to unmanageable space constraints, and allowed MERT to have additional room while moving closer to the zone with highest call density (occurring at or around the Quad). Despite a failed attempt at obtaining a fly car in 2010, MERT continues to seek administrative approval for new EMS vehicles.

In 2012, MERT was officially recognized as a Quick Response agency by the Pennsylvania Department of Health, making it the first University in the Philadelphia region to be recognized as such.

== Operations ==
=== Daily operations ===
MERT operates from 5 PM to 7 AM on weekdays and continuously on weekends during the academic year. Each MERT crew consists of 2-4 members certified as Emergency Medical Technicians in the Commonwealth of Pennsylvania. These crews include a crew chief (or lead EMT), and one/two biking EMTs. MERT typically responds using specially equipped EMS bikes carrying all necessary medical equipment to handle both traumatic injuries and medical emergencies. As a BLS service in Pennsylvania, MERT is able to provide oxygen therapy, stabilize trauma patients, splint suspected fractures and joint injuries, utilize artificial airways, provide ventilatory support, administer certain medications (including Epinephrine) and defibrillate patients. The typical response time of MERT is less than 5 minutes.

=== Special events ===
MERT provides additional hours and coverage during athletic and major university events such as New Student Orientation, Spring Fling, the Penn Relays, Hey Day, and Graduation. During these events, multiple crews of 3-4 EMTs may be deployed to ensure quick and adequate emergency response. MERT members receive additional training in preparation for special events, which often includes simulated scenarios of common emergencies encountered.

=== Disaster response ===
MERT is also trained to handle mass casualty incidents that could potentially occur within the Penn Community. The organization, in conjunction with the university's Division of Public Safety, operates mass casualty incident drill each semester, where simulated patients must be triaged and treated for injuries. Prior simulations have included a bus accident and a mass shooting. In the case of an actual emergency or disaster, MERT members would be contacted by the university's Division of Public Safety and could possibly be given instructions to respond.

== Education ==
MERT offers a variety of training opportunities for both its members and members of the greater Penn community. Training includes EMT training, American Heart Association CPR training, and Continued Medical Education credits. EMT training is conducted annually through the Perelman School of Medicine and generates approximately 18 new EMTs per class. CPR training is provided by MERT members trained as CPR Instructors at the Healthcare Provider level. CPR classes are conducted for MERT members, Penn Nursing students, college house residents, and other members of the Penn community (including staff members and Penn parents). MERT frequently invites guest lecturers from the University of Pennsylvania Health System, including trauma surgeons, cardiologists, paramedics and other health professionals to speak at its weekly general body meeting. When speakers are not available, MERT members practice treating patients with simulated medical emergencies.

== MERT board ==
MERT's board is responsible for the operation and administration of the organization. As MERT is student-run, all board members are students at the university.

Executive board

Chief: Raymond Tabak

Captain: Sneha Chandrashekar

Quality Assurance Lieutenant: Vyvy Mai

Training Lieutenant: Eric Kuznetsov

Administrative Director: Angela Ge

General board

Alumni Relations Officer: Clara Shin

Bicycle Officer: Emmanuel Tawiah

Co-Community Outreach Officer: Ankita Kuttichirayil

Co-Community Outreach Officer: Samuel Dago Fernandez

Co-CPR Officer: Ananya Madhira

Co-CPR Officer: José Méndez Cruz

Disaster Response Training Officer: Kyle Rakovitsky

Co-EMT Class Membership Officer: Stella Zerbini

Co-EMT Class Membership Officer: Jonathan Kim

Reciprocity Membership Officer: Vyas Dhar

Equipment Officer: Samantha Wu

Internal Technology Officer: Sanya Kejriwal

Scheduling Officer: Emmy Harrison

Standby Officer: Kyle Taylor

Social Officer: Anvesha Guru

Board members must remain in good standing within the organization to maintain their position.

== Awards ==
Since its founding in 2006, MERT has been the recipient of numerous awards, from both the National Collegiate Emergency Medical Services Foundation and University Officials.

Year	Award	Recipient	Recognizing Organization
2024	Collegiate EMS Community Engagement Program of the Year	Penn MERT	NCEMSF
2022	EMS Ready Campus	Penn MERT	NCEMSF
2022	HeartSafe Campus	Penn MERT	NCEMSF
2021	Collegiate EMS Community Engagement Program of the Year	Penn MERT	NCEMSF
2020	Striving for Excellence Award	Penn MERT	NCEMSF
2019	Best EMS Research Award	Penn MERT	NCEMSF
2019	Best Website Award	Penn MERT	NCEMSF
2016	Advisor of the Year	Chief Eugene Janda, FES	NCEMSF
2013	Striving for Excellence Award	Penn MERT	NCEMSF
2011	Campus EMS Organization of the Year	Penn MERT	NCEMSF
2010	Striving for Excellence Award	Penn MERT	NCEMSF
2009	George J. Koenig, Jr. Service Award	Lieutenant John Washington, UPPD	NCEMSF
2009	Campus EMS Provider of the Year	Kevin Smith, MERT Operations Captain	NCEMSF
2009	Website of the Year	Penn MERT	NCEMSF
2008	Fox Scholar	Adam Novick	Fox Leadership
2007	Striving for Excellence Award	Penn MERT	NCEMSF
2007	Campus EMS Provider of the Year	Andrew Mener, MERT Founder	NCEMSF
Undated	Certificate of Appreciation	Evan Silverstein, EMT who delivered a child	The University of Pennsylvania's Department of Public Safety
Undated	Certificate of Appreciation	Evan Silverstein, Adam Novick, Jake Bevilacqua, and Andrew Mener, founding EMTs	The University of Pennsylvania's Department of Public Safety
2006	Robert A. Fox Student Leadership Award	Andrew Mener, MERT Founder	Fox Leadership
