= Therese S. Richmond =

American nurse

Academic background
- Education: Diploma, 1975, Thomas Jefferson University; BSN, 1978, University of Delaware; MSN, 1982, Catholic University of America; PhD, 1995, University of Pennsylvania
- Thesis: An explanatory model of variables influencing funcitional recovery following traumatic injury (1995)

Academic work
- Institutions: University of Pennsylvania School of Nursing

Therese S. Richmond is an American nurse researcher. She is the Andrea B. Laporte Professor of Nursing and Associate Dean for Research and Innovation at the University of Pennsylvania School of Nursing, and a member of the National Academy of Medicine

== Early life and education ==
Richmond completed her Diploma in nursing from Thomas Jefferson University in 1975 and her Bachelor of Science in Nursing from the University of Delaware in 1978. Following this, she completed her Master of Science in Nursing from the Catholic University of America in 1982 and her PhD from the University of Pennsylvania in 1995.

== Career ==
Upon completing her PhD, Richmond joined the faculty at the Hospital of the University of Pennsylvania (HUP) as an assistant professor of Trauma and Critical Care Nursing. She received funding from Penn's internally-funded Research Foundation for her project Post Injury Disability in Elderly Trauma Patients. Shortly after arriving at Penn, Richmond developed the Acute Care Nurse Practitioner Program and created a new PhD course, Health Status, Functional Status, and Quality of Life in 2001. As a result of her efforts, she was promoted to the rank of associate professor of nursing at the University of Pennsylvania School of Nursing (Penn) in 2005.

During her tenure at Penn, Richmond has focused her research on the intersection of physical and mental health after traumatic injury and its effect on recovery. She co-founded Penn's Firearm & Injury Center and directed the Hillman Scholar Program in Nursing Innovation. By 2015, she was the Associate Director of Penn Nursing’s Biobehavioral Research Center, Associate Dean for Research and Innovation at Penn Nursing, and sat on the Executive Committee of the Penn Injury Science Center.

== Honors ==
In 2015, Richmond was elected a Member of the National Academy of Medicine for her "research on the psychological effects of injuries in order to reduce disability, depression and post-traumatic stress disorder, with a goal of improving recovery and overall quality of life."

In 2013, she was inducted into the International Nurse Researcher Hall of Fame. and was named the 2015 recipient of Penn Nursing's Claire M. Fagin Award for Distinguished Research.

In 2017, Richmond was named the recipient of the Sigma Theta Tau International Episteme Award for her research. In 2021, Richmond was appointed to a three-year term on the National Academies of Sciences, Engineering, and Medicine Board on Population Health and Public Health Practice.
