= Shelly Johnson (academic administrator) =

American academic administrator

Shelley Johnson
- Education: University of Pennsylvania; Northwestern University; Pennsylvania State University; University of Phoenix
- Scientific career
- Fields: Nursing
- Workplaces: Lincoln University; Florida A&M University

Shelly Johnson is an American academic administrator specializing in nursing programs. She was dean of the Florida A&M University school of nursing from 2020 to 2023. Johnson previously served as the founding director and chair of nursing and health science at Lincoln University.

== Education ==
Johnson earned a B.S. in nursing from the University of Pennsylvania School of Nursing. She completed an executive M.B.A. from Northwestern University and a master's degree in community health nursing from Pennsylvania State University. She earned a doctorate in educational leadership from University of Phoenix.

== Career ==
Johnson worked in the administration of undergraduate and graduate nursing programs at Chamberlain University, Rutgers University, La Salle University, and the University of Medicine and Dentistry of New Jersey. At Lincoln University, she served as the founding director and chair of nursing and health science. She is the owner and senior consultant at Kairos Solutions, LLC., an educational consultancy. She is a certified nurse executive and nurse educator.

On July 1, 2020, Johnson joined the Florida A&M University as the dean of its school of nursing. She resigned on July 12, 2023, and was succeeded by interim dean Lisa Gardner.
