= Hopkins Emergency Response Organization =

Hopkins Emergency Response Organization (HERO)
- Established: 1995
- Headquarters: Baltimore, Maryland, U.S.
- Jurisdiction: The Johns Hopkins University's Homewood Campus and Surrounding Neighborhood.
- Employees: ~60
- BLS or ALS: BLS
- Website: www.heru.jhu.edu

The Hopkins Emergency Response Organization (HERO) is the Johns Hopkins University's student-run emergency medical services organization, providing care to the Homewood community in Baltimore, Maryland. HERO's operational arm, the Hopkins Emergency Response Unit, provides patient care under the supervision of the organization's Board of Directors.

== History ==
Originally, HERU operated as an Emergency First Responder organization, providing care consistent with that level of training. In early 2006, HERU's first EMT class graduated and the organization transitioned to providing care at the EMT level at all time.

== Hopkins Emergency Response Unit ==
The Hopkins Emergency Response Unit is the operational branch of HERO and provides all patient care on behalf of HERO.

=== Daily operations ===
HERU operates a three-person primary crew throughout the academic year composed of an EMT, field training officer, and duty officer. The EMT and field training officer are expected to provide the direct hands-on patient care under the supervision of the duty officer. The duty officer is expected to supervise the other crew members, ensure the scene functions smoothly and provide the final say on all medical decisions. The EMT and field training officer on duty are required to respond to every call, however, the duty officer may choose to respond to calls at their discretion or if requested by the other crew members. HERU operates five shifts per day during the week: a night shift from 0000 to 0800, a shift from 0800 to 1200, a shift from 1200 to 1600, a shift from 1600 to 2000, and a shift from 2000 to 0000. Over the weekends, HERU shifts follow an alternate schedule. The Friday evening shift, typically lasting from 2000-0000, is extended until 1000 on Saturday morning. Saturdays are divided into three shifts: 1000 to 1500, 1500 to 2000, and 2000 to 1000. Sundays follow a schedule nearly identical to Saturdays, with the change that the 2000 shift lasts until 0000, beginning the weekly cycle anew.

== Board of directors ==
The HERO Constitution provides for an eight-person board of directors, or BOD, consisting of a captain, personnel officer, equipment officer, recruitment and retention officer, training officer, secretary, treasurer, and member at large. Each member of the BOD aside from the member at large is elected at the end of the semester general Body meeting in December and serves for the following calendar year. BOD meetings are chaired by the captain and are open to the general body unless they are explicitly designated as closed. Each member of the BOD, minus the member at large, has one vote on all matters before the BOD and all matters can be voted upon by the BOD except for medical direction and policies, which are at the discretion of the captain and appropriate medical directors.

== Training ==
The HERO training officer is responsible for all training opportunities for new and current members. New members of HERO who are not already certified EMTs are required to complete a Maryland EMT course arranged by HERO. This course is held over Intersession at Johns Hopkins University, and is overseen by the Training Officer. New members of HERO who already possess an EMT license are referred to as "Priors" and do not participate in the Intersession EMT course. The EMT course is currently taught by Johns Hopkins Lifeline and LifeStar Response.

=== Continuing education ===
The training officer is also responsible for organizing internal continuing education for all members of HERO. All members of the unit are required to complete 6 "con-eds" each semester to remain active on the unit. Current categories of con-eds include trauma, medical, operational, resuscitation, and behavioral emergencies. Active members must also complete a Medications Quiz, based on the Maryland BLS medications protocols, as well as a mock call every semester.

== Awards ==
Year	Award	Recipient	Recognizing Organization
2016	Homewood Award	HERO	Johns Hopkins Student Government Association
2016	HEARTSafe Campus	HERO	NCEMSF
