= The Anatomy Lesson of Dr. Nicolaes Tulp =

1632 painting by Rembrandt

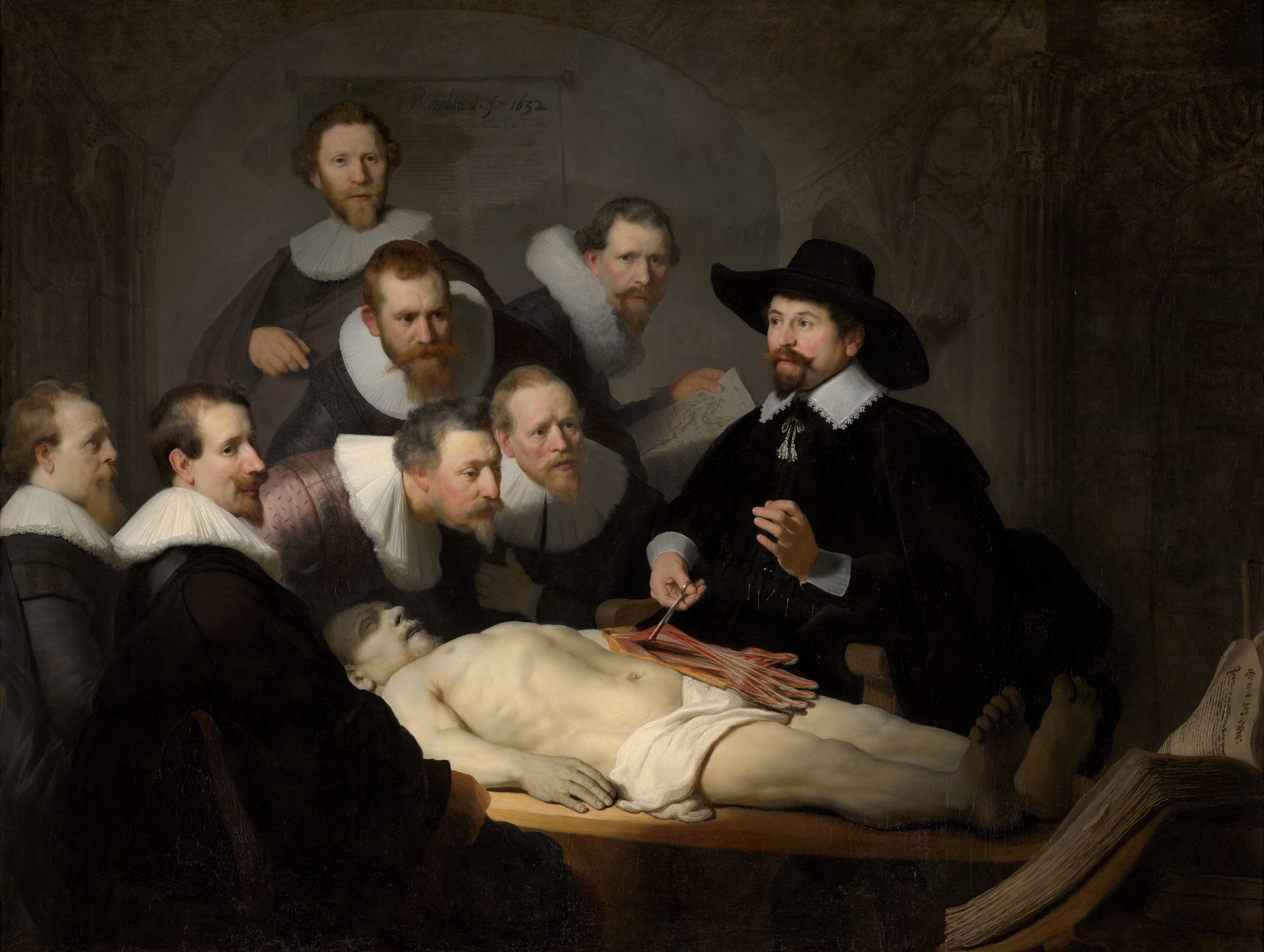
- Artist: Rembrandt
- Year: 1632
- Medium: Oil on canvas
- Movement: Baroque painting, Dutch Golden Age painting
- Dimensions: 216.5 cm × 169.5 cm (85.2 in × 66.7 in)
- Location: Mauritshuis, The Hague

The Anatomy Lesson of Dr. Nicolaes Tulp is a 1632 oil painting on canvas by Rembrandt housed in the Mauritshuis museum in The Hague, Netherlands. It was originally created to be displayed by the Surgeons Guild in their meeting room. The Surgeons' Widow Fund had planned to sell the painting in 1828, but this was blocked by royal decree of King William I. The Dutch state purchased it instead for 32,000 guilders and placed it in the Mauritshuis. The painting is regarded as one of Rembrandt's early masterpieces.

In the work, Nicolaes Tulp is pictured explaining the musculature of the arm to a group of doctors. Some of the spectators are various doctors who paid commissions to be included in the painting. The painting is signed in the top-left hand corner Rembrant. f[ecit] 1632. This may be the first instance of Rembrandt signing a painting with his forename (in its original form) as opposed to the monogram RHL (Rembrandt Harmenszoon of Leiden).

== Background ==
The event can be dated to 31 January 1632: the Amsterdam Guild of Surgeons, of which Tulp was official City Anatomist, permitted only one public dissection a year, and the body would have to be that of an executed criminal.

Anatomy lessons were a social event in the 17th century, taking place in lecture rooms that were actual theatres, with students, colleagues and the general public being permitted to attend on payment of an entrance fee. The spectators are appropriately dressed for this social occasion. It is thought that the uppermost (not holding the paper) and farthest left figures were added to the picture later.

Every five to ten years, the Surgeon's Guild would commission a portrait by a leading portraitist of the period; Rembrandt was commissioned for this task when he was 26 years old, and newly arrived in Amsterdam. It was his first major commission in Amsterdam. Each of the men included in the portrait would have paid a certain amount of money to be included in the work, and the more central figures (in this case, Tulp) probably paid more. Rembrandt's anatomical portrait radically altered the conventions of the genre, by including a full-length corpse in the center of the image (using Christ-like iconography) and creating not just a portrait but a dramatic mise-en-scène. Rembrandt's image is a fiction; in a typical anatomy lesson, the surgeon would begin by opening the chest cavity and thorax because the internal organs there decay most rapidly. This painting and other "anatomy works of art" are foremost group portraits, not documentation of dissections.

The picture shows no cutting instruments. Instead we see in the lower right corner an enormous open textbook on anatomy, possibly the 1543 De humani corporis fabrica (Fabric of the Human Body) by Andreas Vesalius.

== The corpse ==
The corpse is that of the criminal Aris Kindt, who was convicted for armed robbery and sentenced to death by hanging. He was executed earlier on the same day of the scene. The face of the corpse is partially shaded, a suggestion of umbra mortis (shadow of death), a technique that Rembrandt was to use further explore in his use of light and shadow (chiaroscuro).

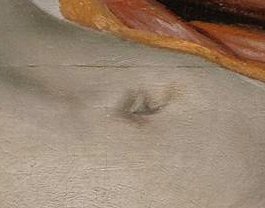
The corpse's navel is formed from the letter R.

The French art historian Jean-Marie Clarke suggests that the navel of the corpse has the shape of a capital R and connects this observation to the fact that Rembrandt worked intensively on his signatures in 1632, using three types consecutively before settling on the final, first name form in 1633.

Medical specialists have commented on the accuracy of muscles and tendons painted by the 26-year-old Rembrandt. It is not known where he obtained such knowledge; it is possible that he copied the details from an anatomical textbook. However, in 2006 Dutch researchers recreated the scene with a male cadaver, revealing several discrepancies of the exposed left forearm compared to that of a real corpse.

In a 2007 study, the American artist and anatomist David J. Jackowe and his colleagues demonstrated that the mysterious white cord that courses along the ulnar aspect of the cadaver's carpus and little finger, long thought to be either an ulnar nerve variant or artistic error, is most likely the tendon of a variant forearm muscle, the accessory abductor digiti minimi.

== The figures ==
Observing the work of Tulp are other surgeons of the guild: Jacob Janszn de Wit (center, leaning in); Adriaen Corneliszn Slabberaen (second on the left); Hartman Hartmanszn (holding paper); Matthijs Evertszn Calkoen (closest to the dissected arm); Jacob Dielofse Block (center); Jacob Janszn Colevelt (extreme left); and Frans Jacobszn Loenen (top). The paper Hartmanszn is holding shows an anatomical illustration of an arm overlapped by a list of the doctors' names.

== Related works ==
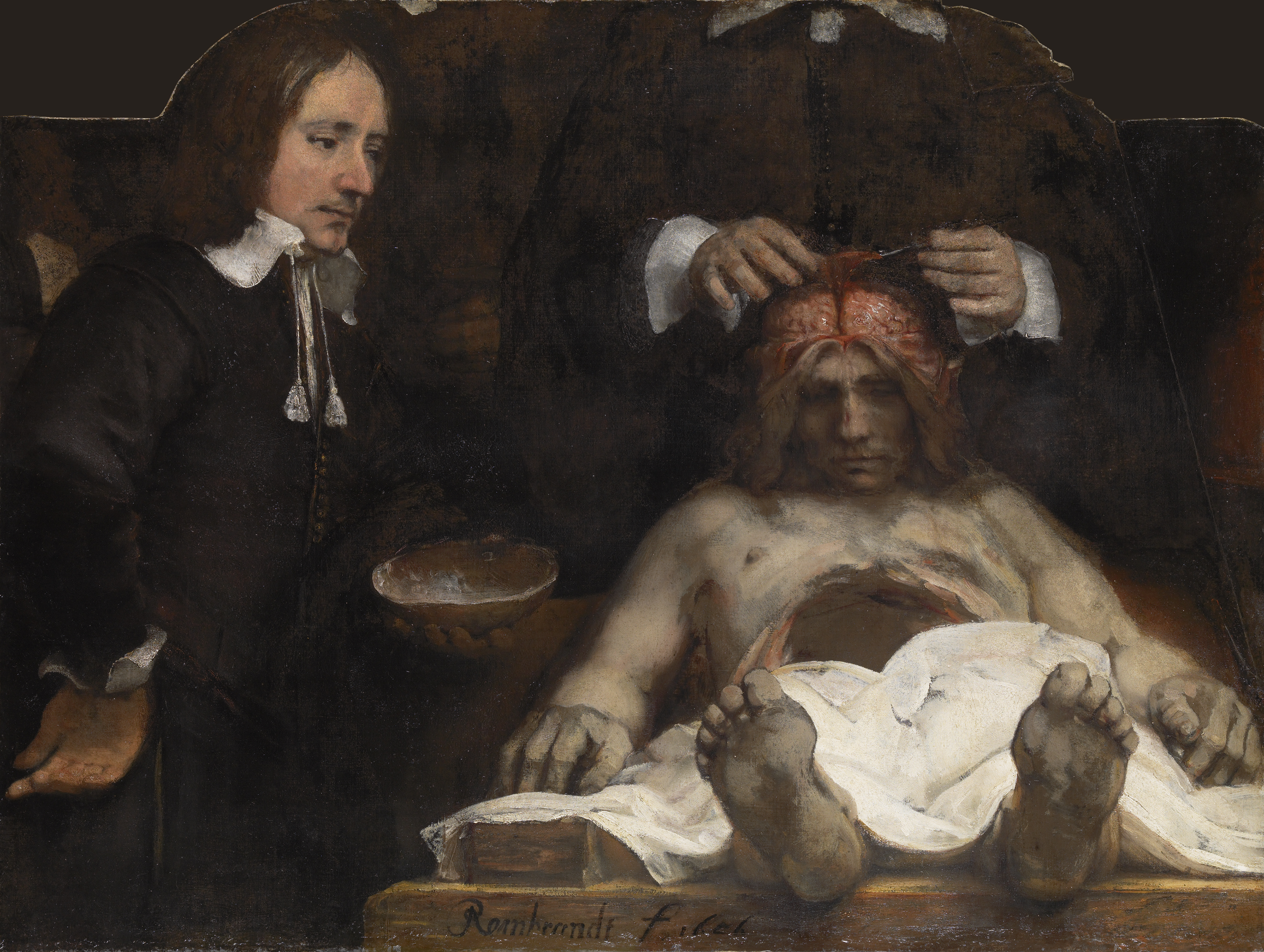
Rembrandt: The Anatomy Lesson of Dr. Deijman (1656)

The Anatomy Lesson of Dr. Deijman, painted by Rembrandt in 1656, was intended to be displayed in the Anatomical Hall in Amsterdam alongside The anatomy lesson of Tulp. Deijman was Tulp's immediate successor in the post of praelector chirugic et anatomie. The painting was damaged by fire in 1723, and only a central fragment survives.

Around 1856 Édouard Manet visited The Hague and made a small oil on panel copy of The Anatomy Lesson. Broadly painted in a limited palette, Manet gave the painting to his physician, François Siredey.

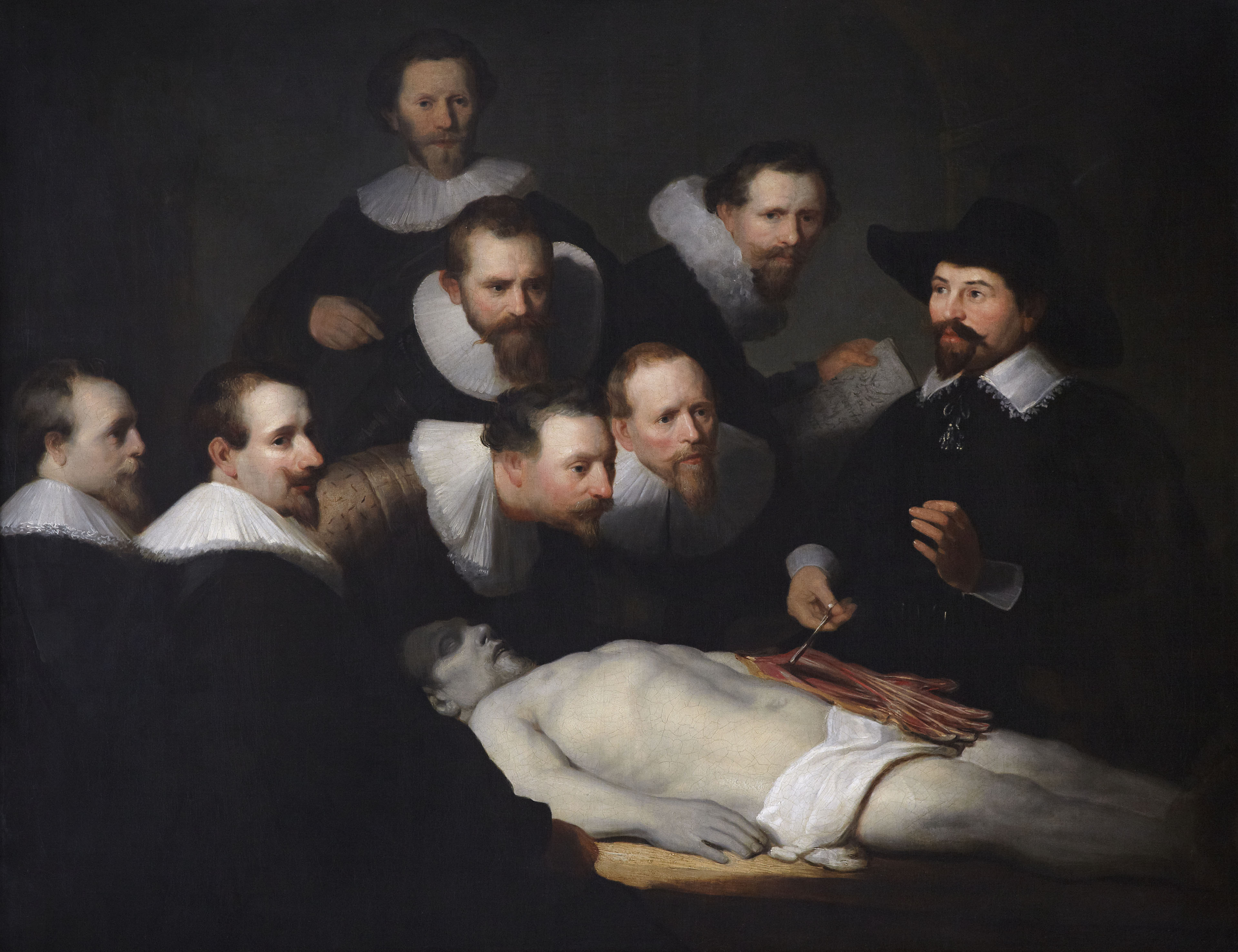
The Anatomy Lesson of Dr Nicolaes Tulp (The University of Edinburgh Fine Art)

A less detailed copy of The Anatomy Lesson of Dr Nicolaes Tulp by an unknown artist hangs in Edinburgh as part of the University of Edinburgh Art Collection.

The Gross Clinic of 1875 and The Agnew Clinic of 1889 are paintings by the American artist Thomas Eakins which treat a similar subject, operations on live patients in the presence of medical students.

In 2010, Yiull Damaso created a parody of the painting depicting prominent South Africans. Nelson Mandela was the cadaver, Nkosi Johnson was the instructor, and the students were Desmond Tutu, F. W. de Klerk, Thabo Mbeki, Jacob Zuma, Cyril Ramaphosa, Trevor Manuel, and Helen Zille. The African National Congress condemned the work as disrespectful to Mandela, racist, and culturally insensitive to African taboos on depiction of living people as dead.

The 2012 painting The Anatomy Lesson of Dr Freeman by Susan Dorothea White references the Rembrandt composition but renders each of the onlookers as an anatomical prosection and skeleton in a contemporary university laboratory; the enormous book is replaced by a computer screen and the background chart by a projection screen; the tendon orientation in the cadaver's left forearm is corrected.

== See also ==
- The Anatomy Lesson of Dr. Deijman (1656), a lesser-known painting by Rembrandt, now fragmentary, also depicting an anatomical lecture.
- List of paintings by Rembrandt
