= Mary V. Clymer =

American nurse

- Born: January 8, 1861; Yardville, New Jersey, U.S.
- Died: September 28, 1942 (aged 81); Harrisburg, Pennsylvania, U.S.
- Education: Hospital of the University of Pennsylvania Training School for Nurses
- Medical career
- Profession: Nurse
- Institutions: Hospital of the University of Pennsylvania
- Notable works: The Clymer Diaries

Mary V. Clymer (January 8, 1861 – September 28, 1942) was an American nurse. Trained at the Hospital of the University of Pennsylvania Training School for Nurses (now the University of Pennsylvania School of Nursing), she kept a detailed journal of her experiences in hospital ward settings and later established the school's alumni organization and wrote its constitution. She is remembered today for her detailed diary, maintained as The Clymer Diaries by the University of Pennsylvania, which served as an important primary source for nursing practices and daily lives of nurses in the late nineteenth century, and for her portrayal in the Thomas Eakins painting The Agnew Clinic.

== Life ==
Credited by the Hospital of the University of Pennsylvania (HUP) as the first trained operating room nurse in Philadelphia, Clymer was born in 1861 in the Yardville section of Hamilton Township, Mercer County, New Jersey, to a prominent Civil War veteran. At the age of 28, Clymer enrolled in the Hospital of the University of Pennsylvania Training School for Nurses. Graduating in 1889 at the top of her class, Clymer was among the first graduates of HUP's nurse training school, which was established in 1886. Clymer was the recipient of the Nightingale Award for her exceptional patient care and scholarship. Fittingly, Clymer missed her graduation ceremony from the Training School because she was providing emergency care to victims of the 1889 Williamsport flood.

After graduation, Clymer worked as a private nurse up until 1900, and was praised by patients and doctors. In 1893 she established the Alumnae Organization of the Hospital of the University of Pennsylvania training school. Upon her marriage in 1901 she retired from nursing, but she remained active in the affairs of the organization and the nursing school until her death. She died in Harrisburg, Pennsylvania in 1942 and was buried in Groveville, New Jersey. Her obituary in the Harrisburg Evening News lists her death date as September 28, 1942, but some sources instead cite September 9 of that year.

== The Agnew Clinic ==
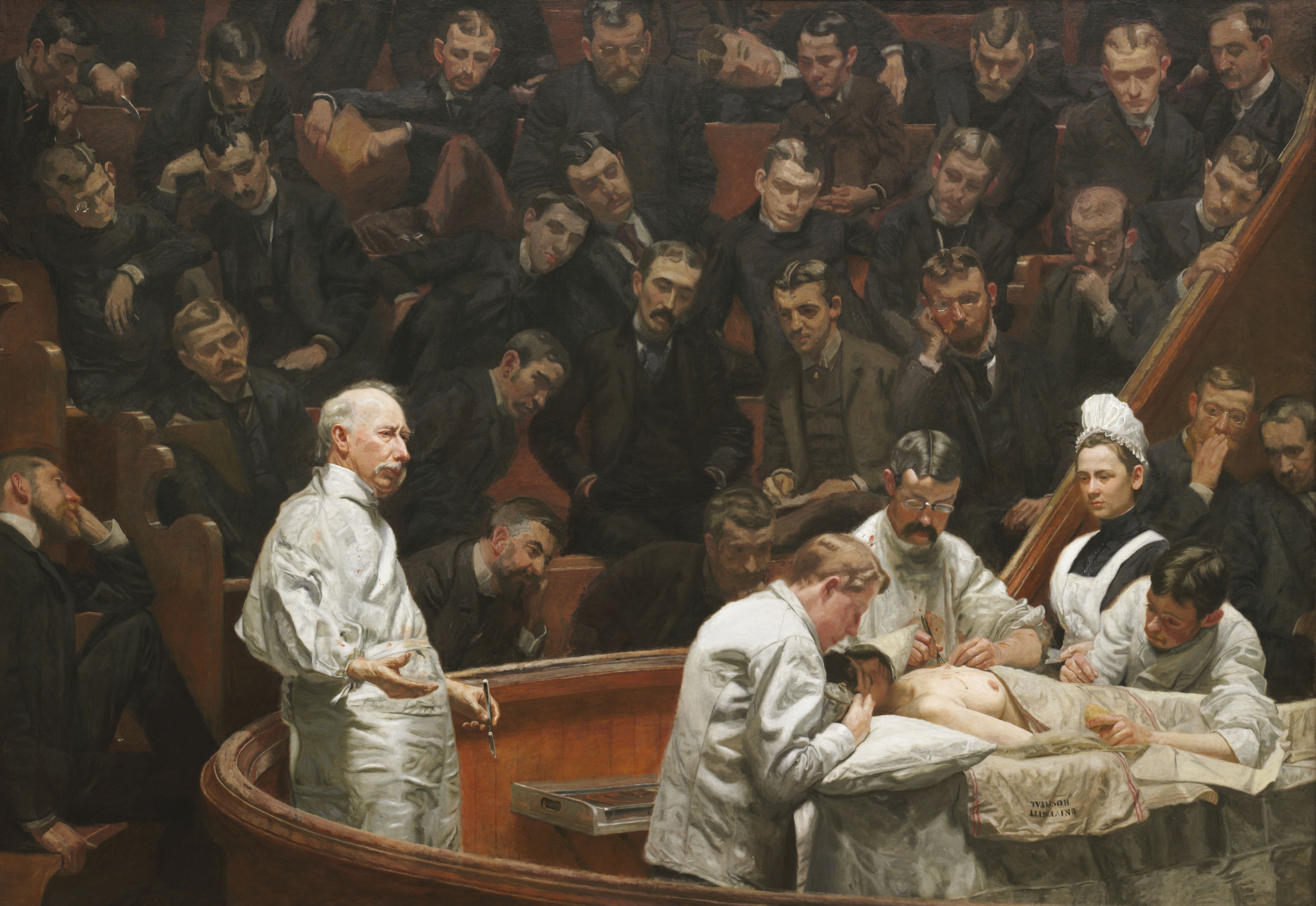
The Agnew Clinic. Clymer is at the far right.

Clymer may be best known for her appearance in the Thomas Eakins work The Agnew Clinic, depicting a surgical procedure headed by noted surgeon David Hayes Agnew. Historians note the significance of Clymer being the only female subject in the painting, apart from the patient, and the only member of the surgical staff whose attention is directed toward the patient's face, rather than the incision. Students of the medical class of 1889 who commissioned The Agnew Clinic are portrayed as the audience for the surgery—as historian Amanda Mahoney points out, all individuals depicted in the work can be identified by name, except for the patient—and this audience of male medical students creates a composition that highlights power dynamics between the masculine and the feminine in the academic medical hierarchy. Central to the medical care of the patient yet separate in her femininity stands the woman in white—the nurse, Mary Clymer, who serves as the surgeon Agnew's "structural counterpart" in the composition of the painting, the only other figure on the same level as the surgeon.

Some art historians read Clymer's presence in the painting as sympathetic to the female patient: Clymer looks down at the objectified female figure and feels connection with another body separate from the male-dominated hospital hierarchy. Others argue that Clymer's presence challenges this dynamic: Clymer's presence demonstrates the increasing technical advancements within nursing and medicine, her placement in the scene is a nod to the contributions to sanitation and organization that nurses brought to the operating room. Clymer may not look down at the female figure in sympathy but with the cool attention of a trained operating room nurse, one who closely monitors her patient's status and anticipates the needs of the surgical team. From the standpoint of medical history, the realist painting demonstrates the increasing dependence of surgery on professional nursing.

== The Clymer Diaries ==
Beginning in 1888, Mary Clymer kept diaries that included clinical and lecture notes, now preserved through the Barbara Bates Center for the Study of the History of Nursing archives. Clymer's diaries reveal daily nursing tasks, practical knowledge learned, and the occasional student's gripe—"Learned nothing new, and everything seemed to go wrong. M.V.C." These diaries have been described as a "vivid glimpse into the past" and an invaluable primary source on American nursing history.

Clymer's notes reveal Eakins' artistic license in the depiction of the mastectomy in The Agnew Clinic; Clymer wrote that, when preparing a patient for operation, one must cover the healthy breast and reveal the affected breast; this is confirmed in Agnew's own writings. Eakins' choice to leave the patient nude may have been for shock value, to clarify the nature of the depicted procedure, or to simply fulfill the artist's desire to portray a nude female figure.

Not only do the diaries of Mary V. Clymer reveal information regarding operating room etiquette that has been used to help understand The Agnew Clinic, they also detail common practices and materia medica of 19th-century medicine employed at HUP during her time there. These medicines and practices include but are not limited to:

- General medicine: Beef tea, cod liver oil, cold baths for fevers, and turpentine, laudanum, lead acetate, and Monsel's solution as hemostatics.
- Care of the skin: Bran and gelatin to protect skin, zinc oxide for burns and blisters, camphorated oil to prevent bedsores, and wound dressings with "lead water and laudanum" for amputations.
- Disinfectants: Alcohol, borax, salt, lime, mercuric chloride, carbolic acid, and prussic acid.
- Respiratory support: Steam inhalation, Turlington's Balsam and mustard plasters for cough, hot brandy or ammonia and hot water for shortness of breath.
- Obstetrics and gynecology: syrup of ipecac for hysteria, cosmoline for cleaning newborn infants, cotton "once dipped in bichlor" for cleaning skin during labor/delivery.
- "A few [tablets from druggists] we ought always have":
  - 1/4 gr. Morphia
  - 1/100 of Atropia
  - 1/8 of pilocarpine Ergotine
  - 1% nitroglycerine

== See also ==
- University of Pennsylvania School of Nursing
- List of works by Thomas Eakins
