= The Gross Clinic =

Painting by Thomas Eakins

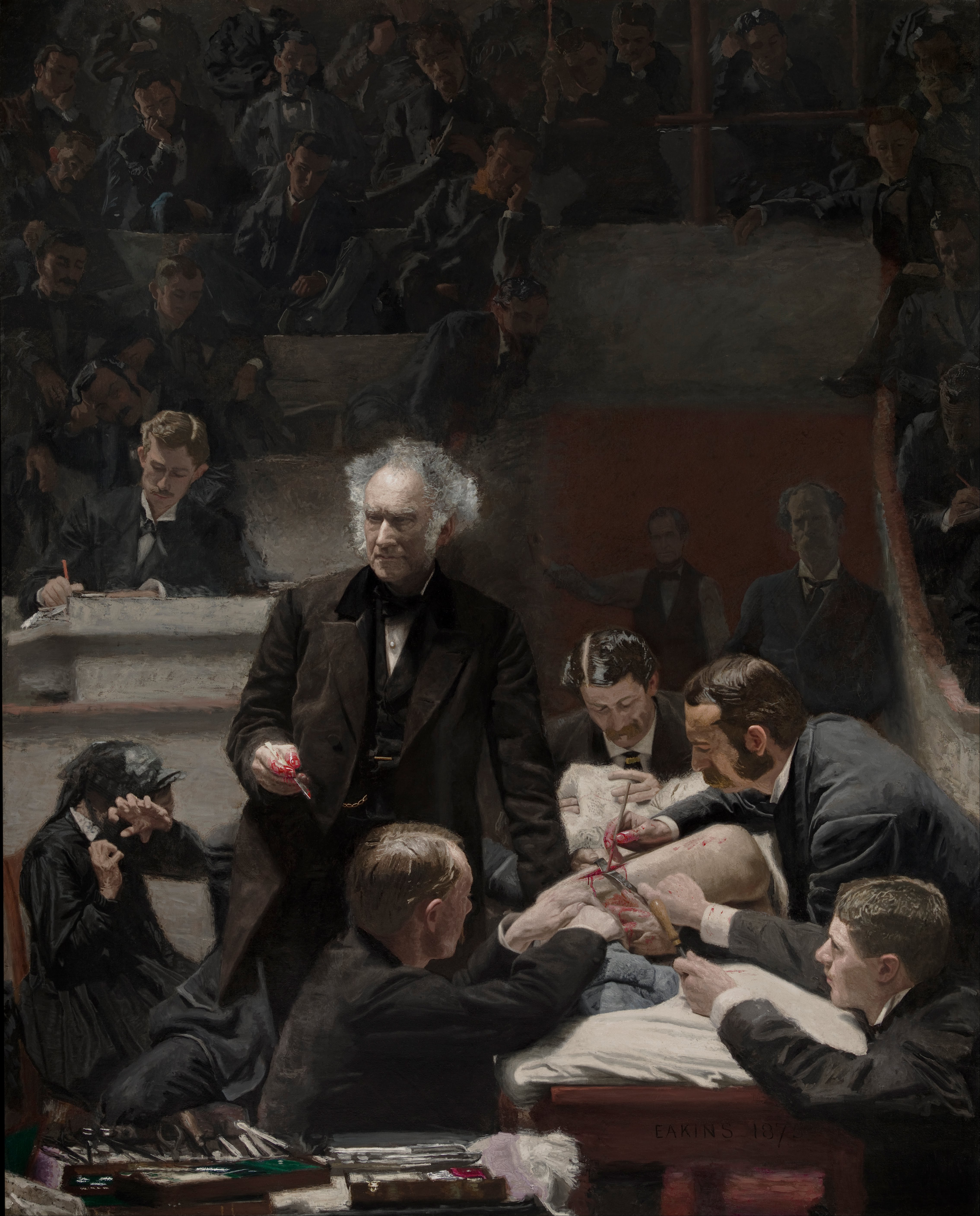
- Artist: Thomas Eakins
- Year: 1875
- Medium: oil on canvas
- Movement: Realism
- Dimensions: 240 cm × 200 cm (8 ft × 6.5 ft)
- Location: Philadelphia Museum of Art and the Pennsylvania Academy of Fine Arts

The Gross Clinic or The Clinic of Dr. Gross is an 1875 painting by the American artist Thomas Eakins. It is an oil on canvas and measures 8 feet (240 cm) by 6.5 feet (200 cm).

The painting depicts Samuel D. Gross, a seventy-year-old professor dressed in a black frock coat, lecturing a group of Jefferson Medical College students. Included among the group is a self-portrait of Eakins, who is seen at the right-hand edge of the painting, next to the tunnel railing, with a white cuffed sleeve sketching or writing. Seen over Gross's right shoulder (on the left-hand side of the painting) is the clinic clerk, Franklin West, taking notes on the operation.

Eakins's signature is painted on the front of the surgical table.

== Description ==
The Gross Clinic depicts the history of medicine, illustrating the emergence of surgery as a healing profession rather than a procedure associated primarily with amputation, and depicting a nineteenth-century surgical theater.

The painting is based on a surgery witnessed by Eakins, in which Gross treated a young man for osteomyelitis of the femur. Gross is pictured here performing a conservative operation, as opposed to the amputation normally carried out.

Here, surgeons crowd around the anesthetized patient in their frock coats—this is just prior to the adoption by American surgeons of a hygienic surgical environment (asepsis) which was becoming standard in Europe. Gross, in fact, regarded antiseptic surgery, or Listerism, as quackery until the end of his life. The Gross Clinic is thus often contrasted with Eakins's later painting The Agnew Clinic (1889), which depicts a cleaner, brighter, surgical theater, with the participants in white coats. In comparing the two, the advance in understanding of the prevention of infection is seen. Another difference in the later painting is the presence of a professional nurse, Mary Clymer, in the operating theater.

It is assumed that the patient depicted in The Gross Clinic was a teenage boy, although the exposed body is not entirely discernible as male or female; the painting is shocking for both the odd presentation of this figure and the matter-of-fact goriness of the procedure.

Adding to the drama is the lone woman in the painting seen in the lower left, possibly the patient's mother, cringing in distress. Her dramatic figure functions as a strong contrast to the calm, professional demeanor of the men who surround the patient.This bloody and very blunt depiction of surgery was shocking at the time it was first exhibited.

== Critical reception ==
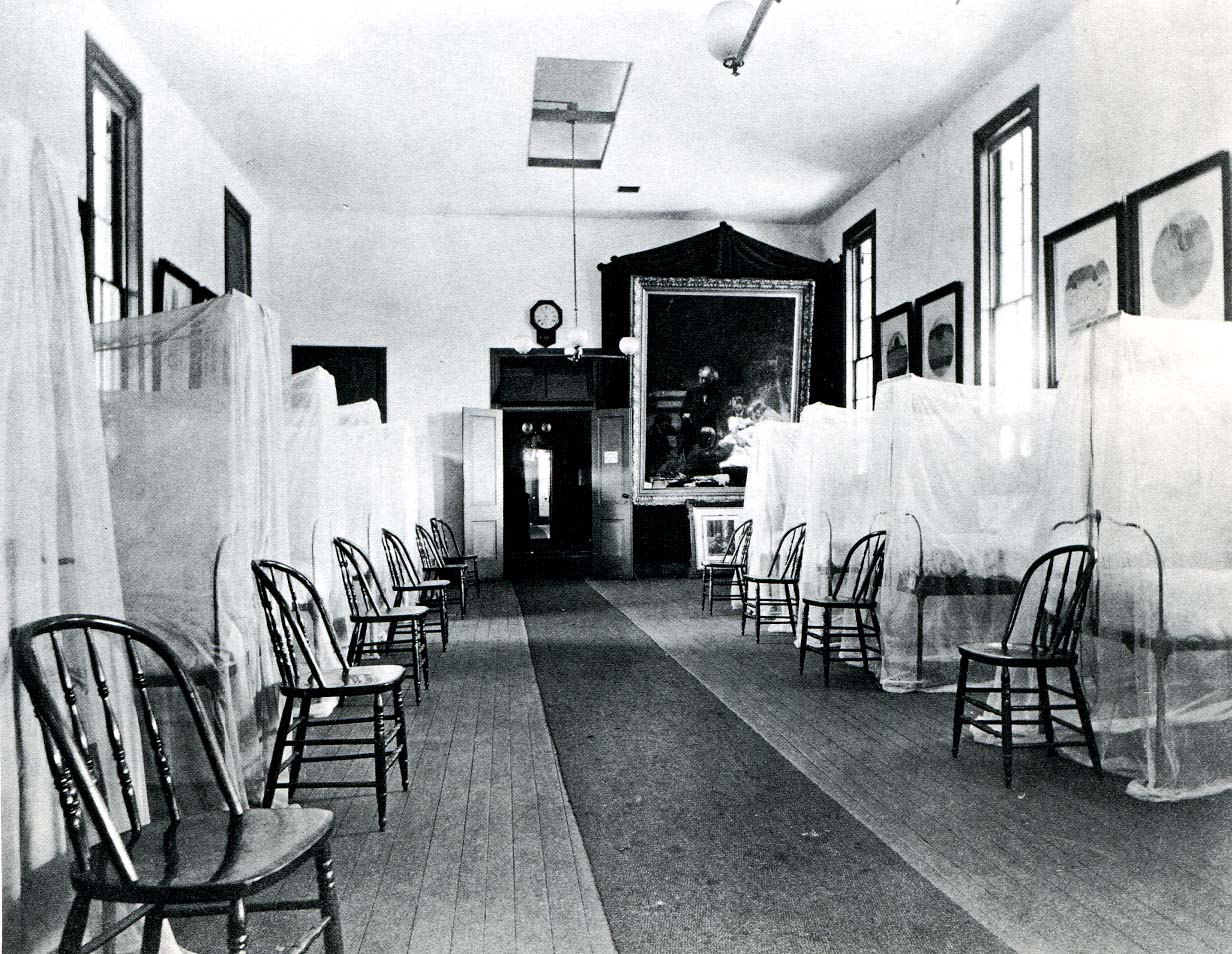
The Gross Clinic on display in the U.S. Army Post Hospital at the 1876 Centennial Exposition.

The painting was submitted for the 1876 Centennial Exhibition in Philadelphia, but was rejected by the Committee of Selection. When it was eventually displayed in Ward One of the U.S. Army Post Hospital, a critic for the New York Tribune wrote that it was:

...one of the most powerful, horrible, yet fascinating pictures that has been painted anywhere in this century...but the more one praises it, the more one must condemn its admission to a gallery where men and women of weak nerves must be compelled to look at it, for not to look at it is impossible.

Another critic, writing in 1885, said:

It is characterized by so many excellent artistic qualities, that one regrets that the work as a whole fails to satisfy. Admirable draughtsman as this painter is, one is surprised that in the arrangement of the figures the perspective should have been so ineffective that the mother is altogether too small for the rest of the group, and the figure of the patient so indistinct that it is difficult to tell exactly the part of the body upon which the surgeon is performing the operation. The monochromatic tone of the composition is, perhaps, intentional, in order to concentrate the effect on the bloody thigh and the crimson finger of the operating professor. But as it is, the attention is at once and so entirely directed on that reeking hand as to convey the impression that such concentration was the sole purpose of the painting. In similar paintings by Ribera, Regnault, and other artists of the horrible, as vivid a result is obtained without sacrificing the light and color in the other parts of the picture; and the effect, while no less intense, is, therefore, less startling and loud.

These assessments were not universal. The critic for Philadelphia's The Evening Telegraph, who may have been aware of the personal politics involved in the advisory group of artists who rejected it, wrote:

There is nothing so fine in the American section of the Art Department of the Exhibition, and it is a great pity that the squeamishness of the Selecting Committee compelled the artist to find a place for it in the United States Hospital building. It is rumored that the blood on Dr. Gross' fingers made some of the members of the committee sick, but, judging from the quality of the work exhibited by them we fear that it was not the blood alone that made them sick. Artists have before now been known to sicken at the sight of pictures by younger men which they in their souls were compelled to acknowledge were beyond their emulation.

Controversy about the painting has centered on its violence, and on the melodramatic presence of the woman. Modern scholars have suggested that the painting may be read in terms of castration anxiety and fantasies of mastery over the body (e.g. Michael Fried), and that it documents Eakins's ambivalence about representing sex difference (e.g. Jennifer Doyle). The painting has also been understood to be drawing an analogy between painting and surgery and as identifying the work of the artist with the emergence of surgery as a respected profession.

In 2002, Michael Kimmelman of The New York Times called it "hands down, the finest 19th-century American painting." In 2006, in response to the impending sale of this painting, The New York Times published a "close reading" which sketches some of the different critical perspectives on this work of art.

== Provenance ==
After its purchase for US$200 at the time of the Centennial Exhibition, the painting was housed in the College Building of Jefferson Medical College, Thomas Jefferson University in Philadelphia until it was moved in the mid-1980s to Jefferson Alumni Hall. Although undocumented, in the late-1970s there was a rumor of a substantial offer by a collector who wished to donate the painting to the National Gallery of Art. On November 11, 2006, the Thomas Jefferson University Board voted to sell the painting for US$68 million to the National Gallery of Art in Washington and the new Crystal Bridges Museum of American Art, then under construction in Bentonville, Arkansas. The sale would represent a record price for an artwork made in the United States prior to World War II.

The proposed sale was seen as a secretive act. In late November 2006, efforts began to keep the painting in Philadelphia, including a fund with a December 26 deadline to raise money to purchase it and a plan to invoke a clause regarding "historic objects" in the city's historic preservation code. In a matter of weeks the fund raised $30 million, and on December 21, 2006, Wachovia Bank agreed to lend the difference until the rest of the money had been raised, keeping the painting in town at the Philadelphia Museum of Art and the Pennsylvania Academy of Fine Arts.

Pledges alone were not enough to cover the US$68 million purchase price. The Pennsylvania Academy of the Fine Arts was forced to sell Eakins's The Cello Player to an unidentified private buyer; and the Philadelphia Museum of Art sold Eakins's Cowboy Singing, along with two oil sketches for Cowboys in the Badlands, to the Anschutz collection and the Denver Art Museum. The Denver-based Anschutz collection purchased Cowboys in the Badlands at a May 22, 2003 auction at Christie's New York for $5,383,500, which was the previous record for an Eakins painting.

A reproduction of The Gross Clinic sits in the place of the original at Thomas Jefferson University. Every year at the graduation ceremony, graduating fellows of Vascular Neurology & Neurocritical Care Departments under the Department of Neurology at Thomas Jefferson University receive a reproduction print of the painting as a parting gift.

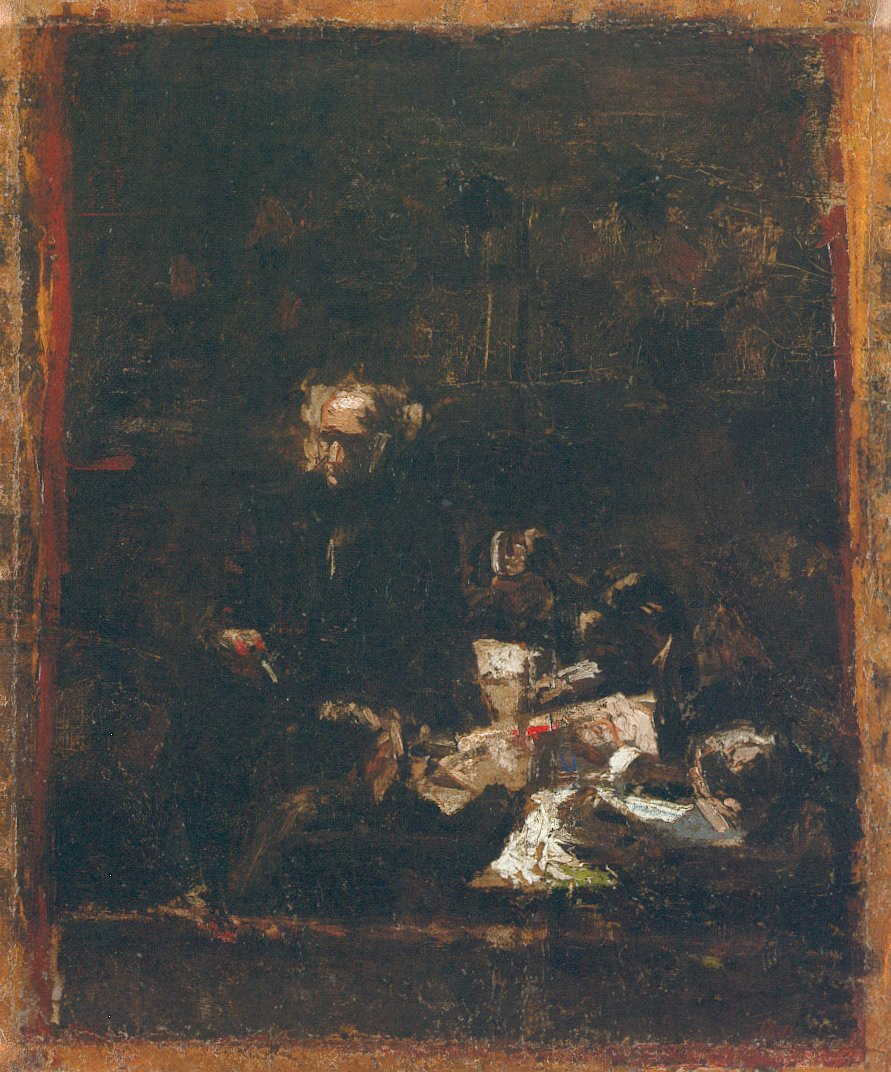
Compositional Study (1875), Philadelphia Museum of Art.

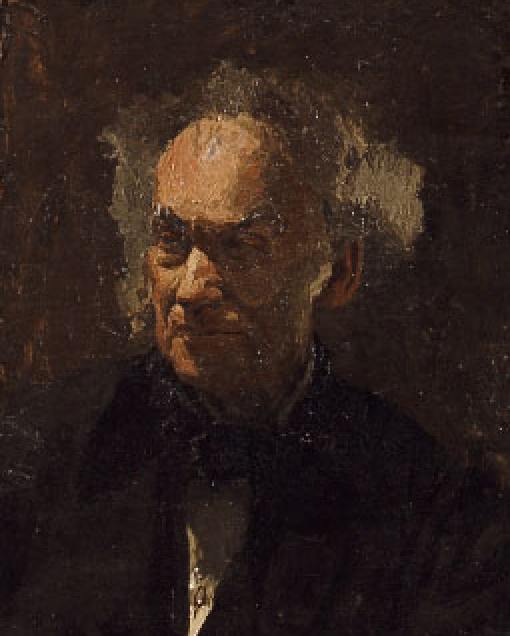
Study for Dr. Gross (1875), Worcester Art Museum, Worcester, MA.

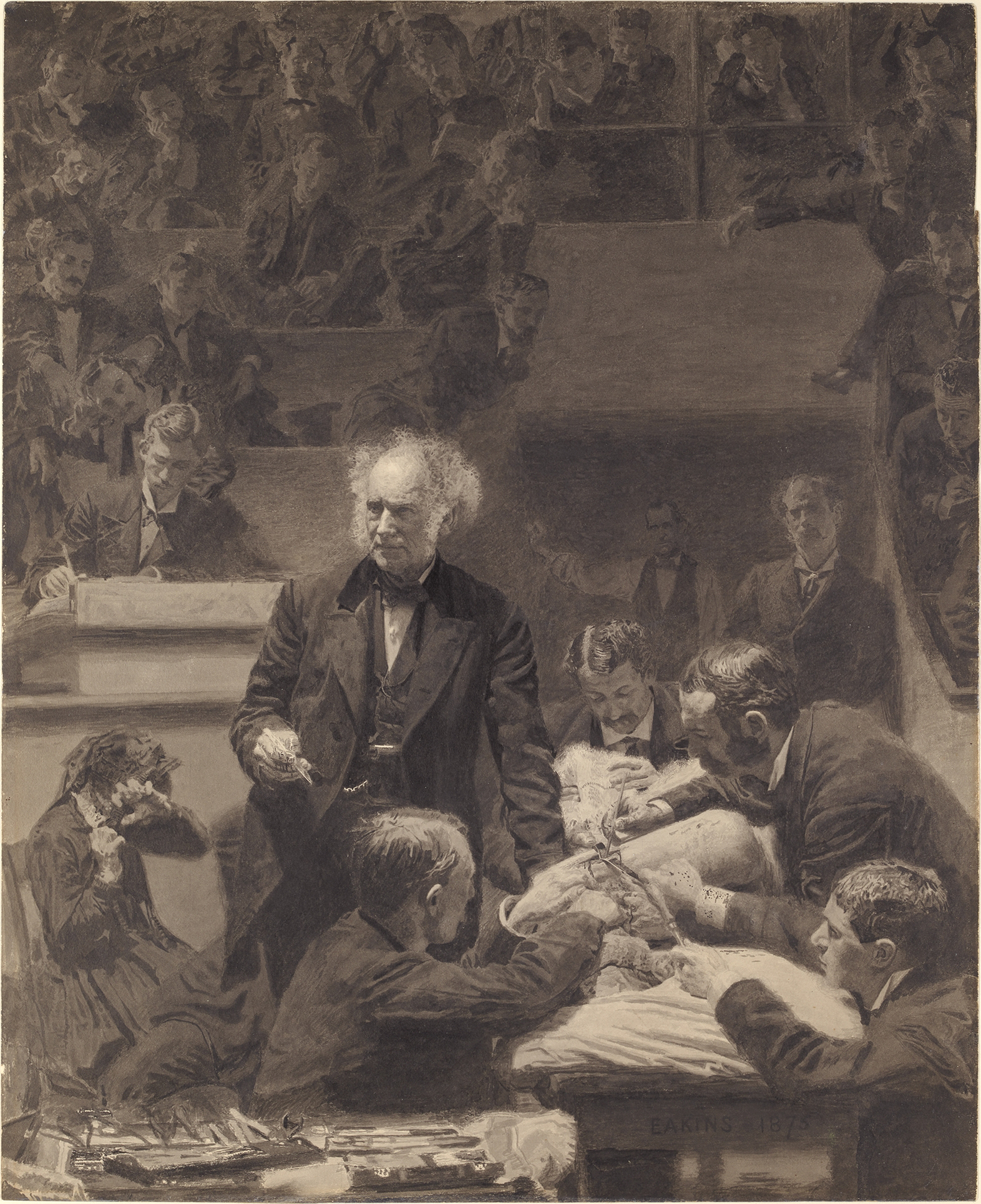
Black and white drawing of the painting (1875), Metropolitan Museum of Art, New York. This illustration was probably made to be photographed.

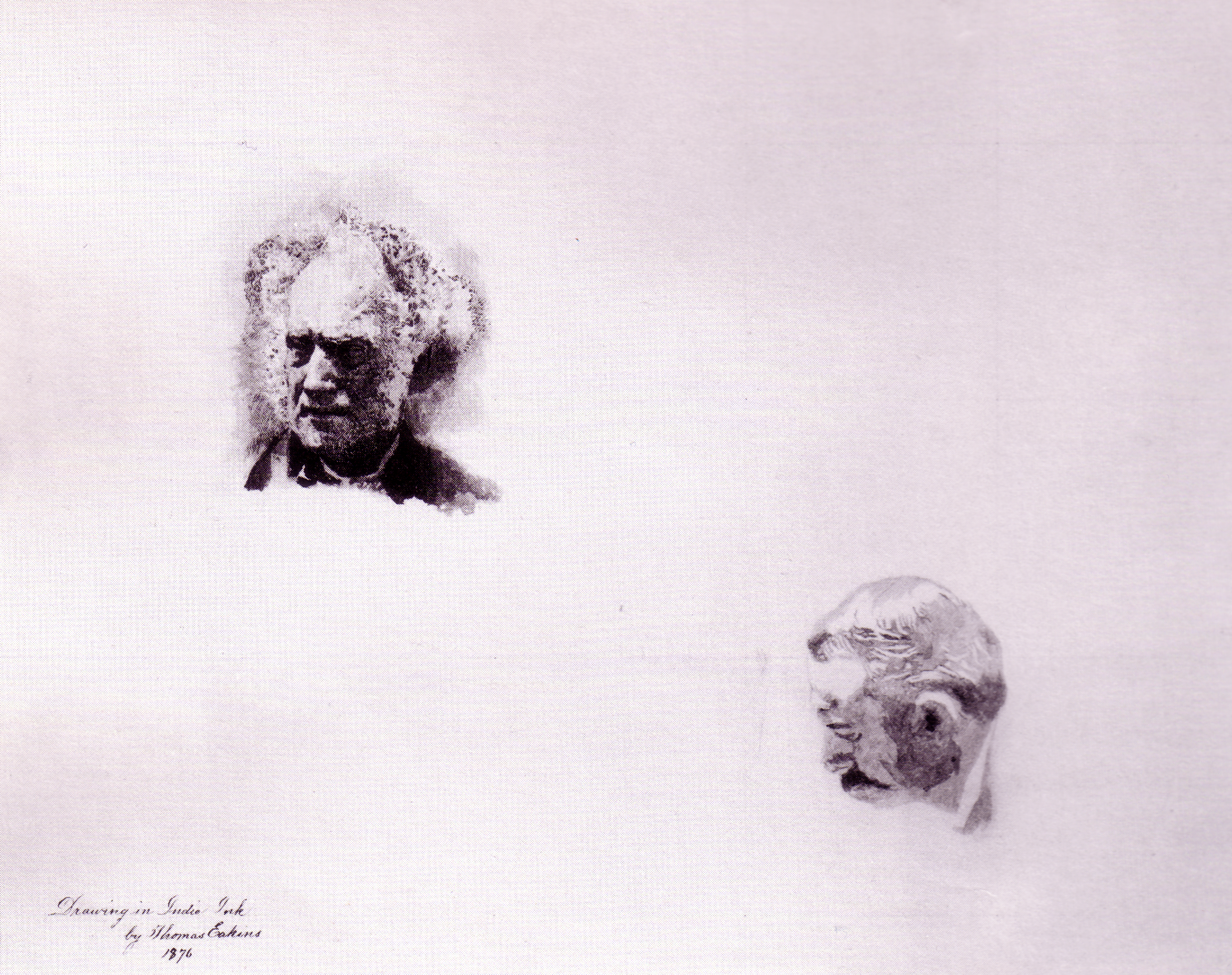
Drawing of Two Heads (1876), Philadelphia Museum of Art.

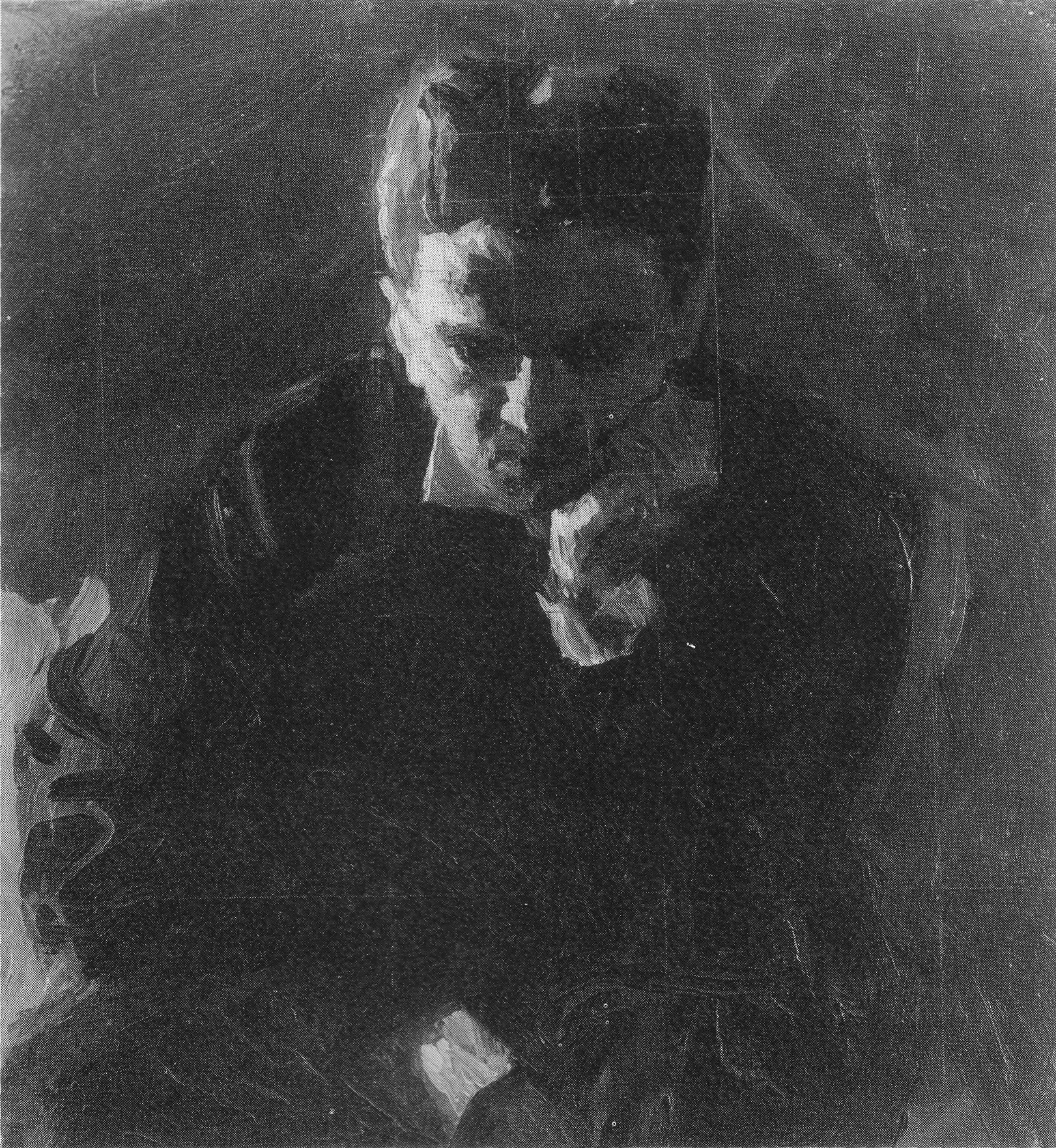
Study of Robert C. V. Meyers (1875), private collection.

== Restorations ==
The painting has been restored three times. The first restoration between 1917 and 1925 substantially damaged the painting, rendering secondary figures in the composition inconsistently bright or reddish in color. In 1929, Susan Macdowell Eakins, the artist's widow, wrote a letter of complaint regarding the "fancy red light" that had falsified the painting's intended tones.

The painting's backing was reinforced with plywood by H. Stevenson in 1915. This was replaced in 1940 by Hannah Mee Horner, who glued the painting to a plywood backing. Within two decades, this backing began to warp and threatened to tear the painting in half.

In 1961, at the request of Jefferson Medical College, the Philadelphia Museum of Art (PMA) undertook another restoration, under conservator Theodor Siegl. Mark Tucker, a later PMA conservator, described the work as "a rescue mission... They were saving the painting from tearing itself in half. These were the nail heads that were starting to work forward into the canvas and show as bumps on the front... Yeah. It was just hair-raising." Siegl used a power plane to remove the plywood down to the last, thin ply. The rest of the wood and the tenacious glue were painstakingly removed by hand. Siegl and his colleagues also restored, to some extent, the faces in the upper right of the canvas.

In 2009, in response to long term concerns regarding inconsistencies in the painting's disposition of darkness and light, conservators at the Philadelphia Museum of Art undertook restoration of The Gross Clinic from July 2009 to July 2010, during which time the painting was not publicly visible. The restoration sought to revert changes that had been made by the Jefferson Medical College during the 1917 restoration. Definition of parts, including Eakins' self-portrayal, was restored, using as reference an ink wash copy of the painting made by the artist, as well as a photograph taken by the Metropolitan Museum of Art previous to the Medical College's changes in 1917.

== See also ==
- The Anatomy Lesson of Dr. Deijman – Damaged painting by Rembrandt from1656
- Anatomy Lesson of Dr. Nicolaes Tulp – 1632 painting by Rembrandt
- A Clinical Lesson at the Salpêtrière – 1887 group tableau portrait by André Brouillet
- List of works by Thomas Eakins
- List of most expensive paintings
- Las Meninas – 1656 painting by Diego Velázquez
