= Mert (surname) =

Mert is a surname. Notable people with the surname include:

- Bahar Mert (born 1975), Turkish volleyball player
- Burak Mert (born 1990), Turkish volleyball player
- Mesut Mert (born 1978), Canadian association football player and coach
- Metehan Mert (born 1999), Turkish footballer
- Muhammed Mert (born 1995), Belgian footballer
- Nuray Mert (born 1960), Turkish journalist and political scientist
- Oksana Andrusina-Mert (born 1973), Turkish female discus thrower also known as Oksana Mert
