= The Anatomy Lesson of Dr. Deijman =

Damaged painting by Rembrandt from1656

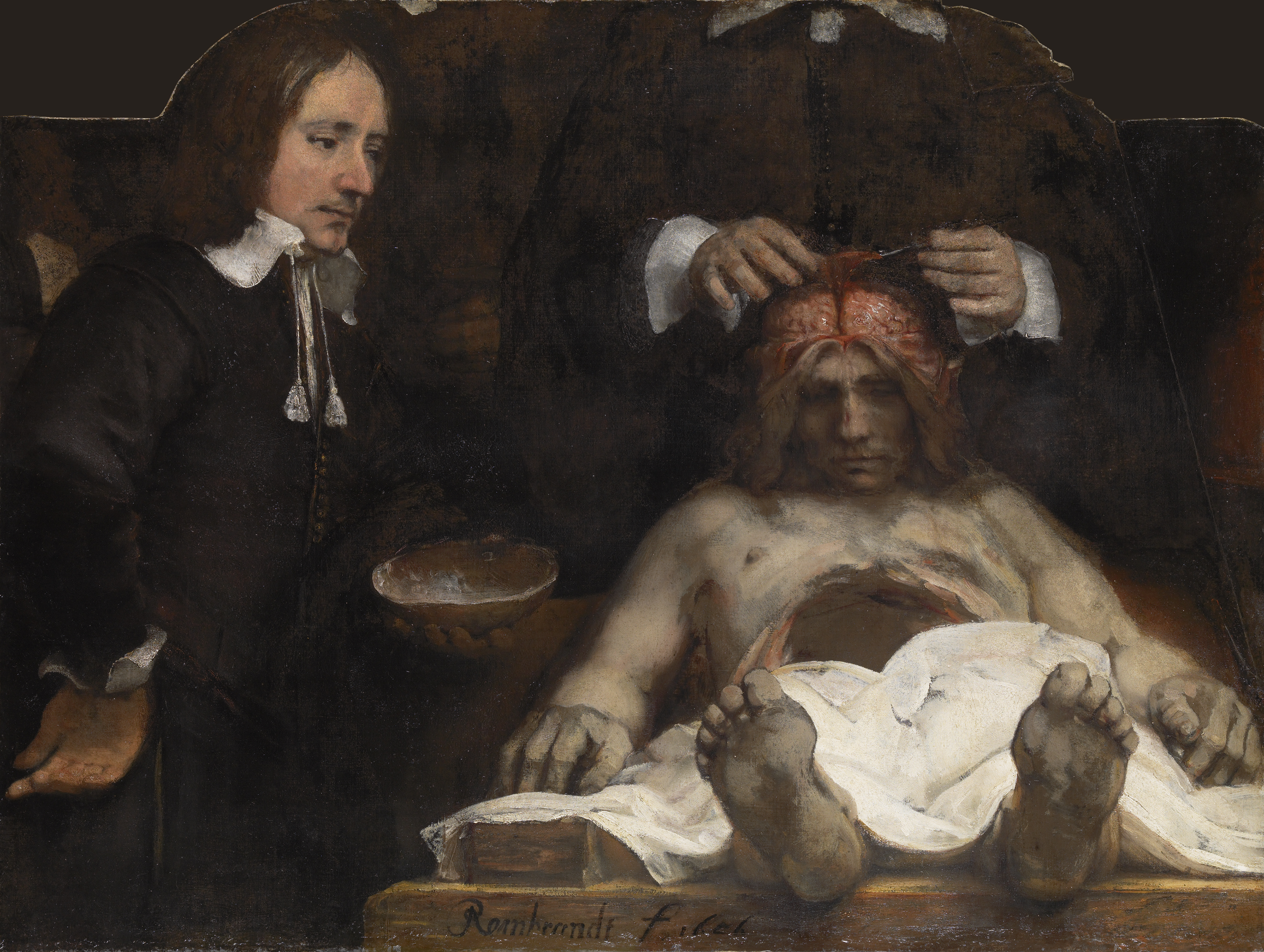
- Artist: Rembrandt van Rijn
- Year: 1656
- Medium: Oil on canvas
- Dimensions: 100 cm × 134 cm (39 in × 53 in)
- Location: Amsterdam Museum, Amsterdam

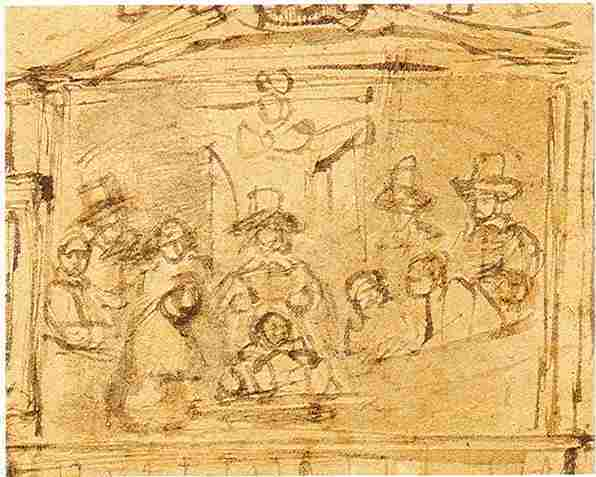
Preparatory sketch for the work

The Anatomy Lesson of Dr. Deijman (alternative spelling Deyman) is a 1656 fragmentary painting by Rembrandt, now in Amsterdam Museum. It is a group portrait showing a brain dissection by Dr. Jan Deijman (1619–1666). Much of the canvas was destroyed in a fire in 1723 and the painting was subsequently recut to its present dimensions, though a preparatory sketch shows the full group.

The painting shows Dr. Deijman performing a brain dissection on the cadaver of an executed criminal, the Flemish tailor Joris "Black Jan" Fonteijn (1633/34–1656), a habitual offender who had robbed a textile store with a knife resulting in his execution by hanging. Dr. Deijman's assistant, the surgeon Gijsbert Calkoen (1621–1664), is seen on the left, holding the top of the dead man's skull.

The perspective of the corpse is depicted with exaggerated foreshortening to give the viewer a sense of standing in front of the dissection table, similar to the foreshortening in Mantegna's Lamentation of Christ, which Rembrandt would have been familiar with through prints.

== Joris Fonteijn ==
Joris Fonteijn (1633/1634–1656), nicknamed "Black Jan" (Zwarte Jan), was originally from Diest in Flanders. Trained as a tailor, he served three and a half years with the Dutch East India Company. After his return to Diest, in October 1653, he squandered the maternal inheritance and became a delinquent. At the end of 1655, he was caught in the act of a burglary at the Nieuwendijk in Amsterdam. He was sentenced to hang on January 27, 1656, and executed two days later. The firearm he used during the burglary is displayed above his head, "for the edification of others". Subsequently, his body was made available to surgeons for three days for their training, and he was buried on February 2 at the Zuiderkerkhof.

== See also ==
- List of paintings by Rembrandt
- The Anatomy Lesson of Dr. Nicolaes Tulp
- Lamentation of Christ (Mantegna)
