= The Agnew Clinic =

Painting by Thomas Eakins

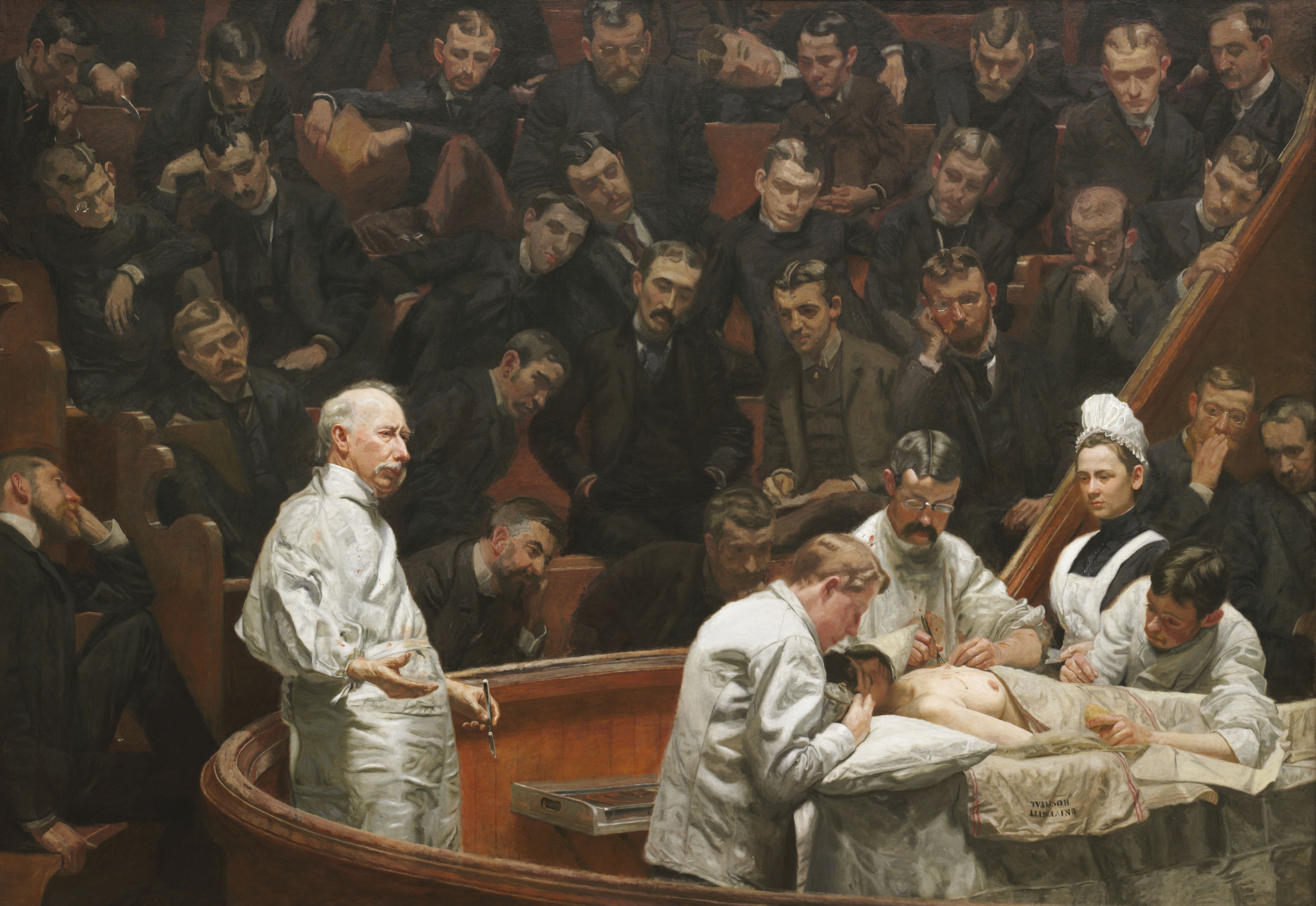
- Artist: Thomas Eakins
- Year: 1889; 137 years ago
- Catalog: Goodrich 235
- Medium: Oil on canvas
- Dimensions: 214 cm × 300 cm (84 3/8 in × 118 1/8 in)
- Location: Philadelphia Museum of Art, Philadelphia

The Agnew Clinic (or The Clinic of Dr. Agnew) is an 1889 oil painting by American artist Thomas Eakins. It was commissioned to honor anatomist and surgeon David Hayes Agnew, on his retirement from teaching at the University of Pennsylvania.

== Background ==
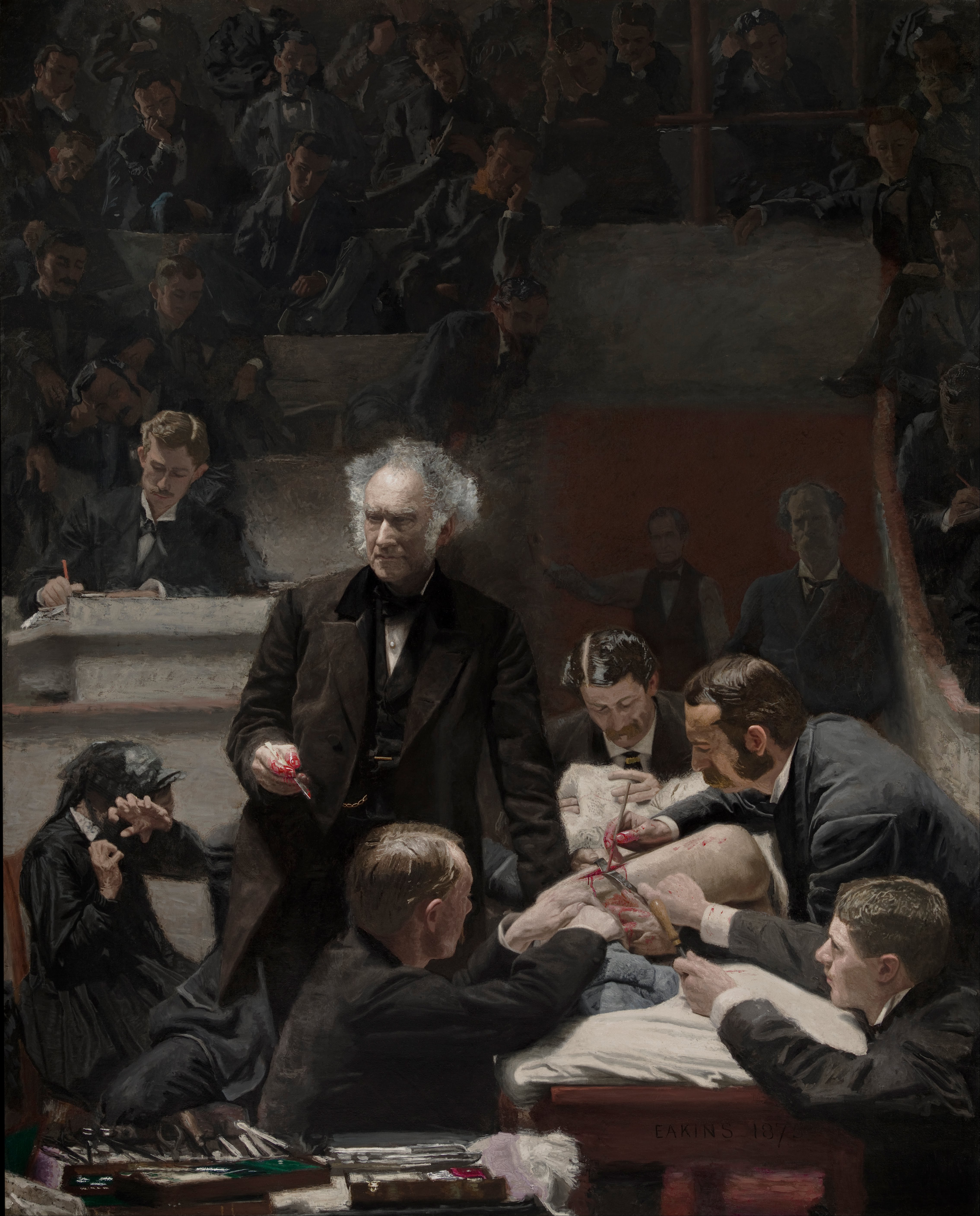
The Gross Clinic (1875). Comparing The Agnew Clinic with Eakins's earlier darker treatment of the same subject illustrates the evolving understanding of surgical hygiene during the intervening 14 years.

The Agnew Clinic depicts Dr. Agnew performing a partial mastectomy in a medical amphitheater. He stands in the left foreground, holding a scalpel. Also present are Dr. J. William White, applying a bandage to the patient; Dr. Joseph Leidy (nephew of paleontologist Joseph Leidy), taking the patient's pulse; and Dr. Ellwood R. Kirby, administering anesthetic. The operating room nurse, Mary V. Clymer, stands between White and Leidy, while, in the background, University of Pennsylvania medical school students observe. One of the students is William Henry Furness III, sitting in the back row with his head cocked 90 degrees. Eakins placed himself in the painting – he is the rightmost of the pair behind the nurse – although the actual painting of him is attributed to his wife, Susan Macdowell Eakins. The painting also records the significant transition, in just 14 years, from the earlier status quo – the participants' black frock coats represented in The Gross Clinic (1875) – to the "white coats" of 1889.

The painting is Eakins's largest work. It was commissioned for $750 (equivalent to $27,000 today) in 1889 by three undergraduate classes at the University of Pennsylvania, to honor Dr. Agnew on the occasion of his retirement. The painting was completed quickly, in three months, rather than the year that Eakins took for The Gross Clinic. Eakins carved a Latin inscription into the painting's frame. Translated, it says: "D. Hayes Agnew M.D. Most experienced surgeon, clearest writer and teacher, most venerated and beloved man."

== Style ==
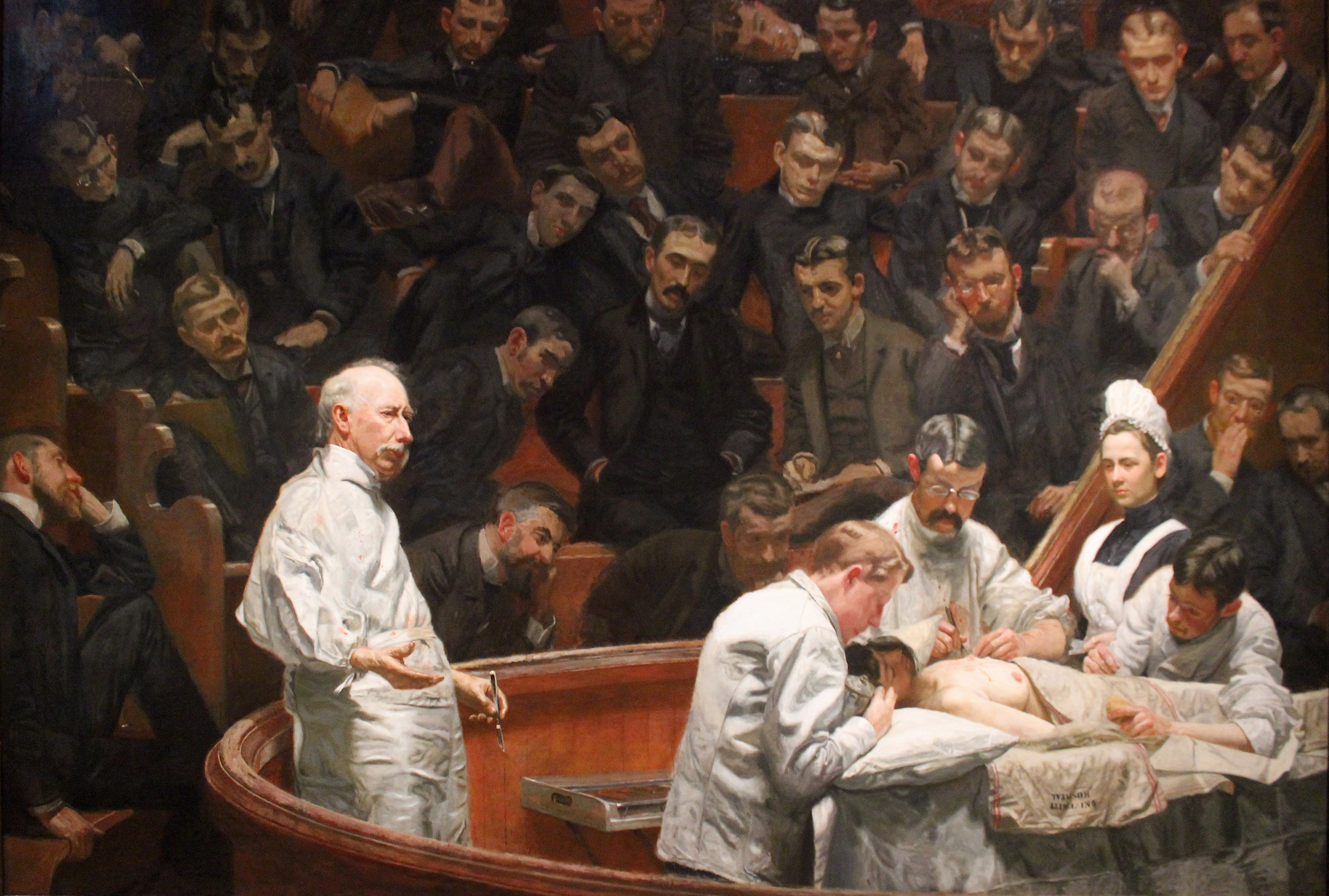
Roll cursor over figures for their names.

The work is a prime example of Eakins's scientific realism. The rendering is almost photographically precise – so much so that art historians have been able to identify everyone depicted in the painting, with the exception of the patient. It largely repeats the subject of Eakins's earlier The Gross Clinic (1875), seen at either the Philadelphia Museum of Art or the Pennsylvania Academy of the Fine Arts, as the two institutions share ownership. The painting echoes the subject and treatment of Rembrandt's famous Anatomy Lesson of Dr. Nicolaes Tulp (1632; in the Mauritshuis museum in The Hague, Netherlands), and other earlier depictions of public surgery such as the frontispiece of Andreas Vesalius's De humani corporis fabrica (1543), the Quack Physicians' Hall (c. 1730) by the Dutch artist Egbert van Heemskerck, and the fourth scene in William Hogarth's The Four Stages of Cruelty (1751).

== Controversy ==
The Agnew Clinic is one of Eakins's most hotly debated works. His decision to portray a partially nude woman observed by a roomful of men (even though they were doctors, and in an undeniably medical setting) was controversial. It was rejected for exhibition at the Pennsylvania Academy of the Fine Arts in 1891, and at New York's Society of American Artists in 1892. Its exhibition at Chicago's 1893 World's Columbian Exposition was criticized.

== Related works ==
Eakins made preparatory sketches for The Agnew Clinic – a drawing of Dr. David Hayes Agnew, an oil study of Agnew, and a compositional sketch for the entire work. Individual studies of all 33 figures were probably made, but none are known to survive.

Eakins later painted a black and white version, specifically to be photographed and reproduced as a photogravure. His friend and protégé, Samuel Murray, modeled a statuette of Eakins at work on the painting.

As of 2009, The Agnew Clinic was on loan from the University of Pennsylvania to the Philadelphia Museum of Art.

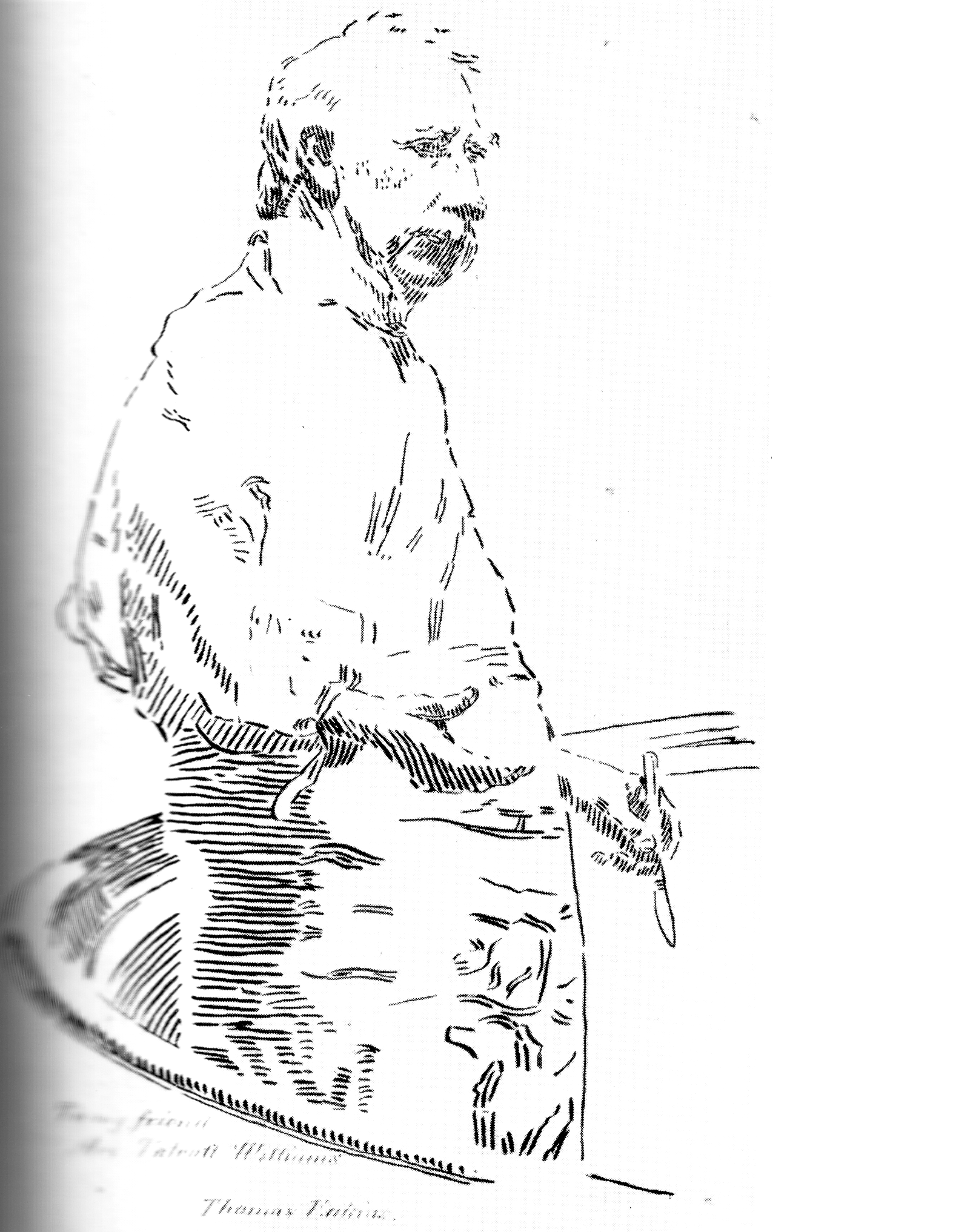
G-235A. Drawing of Dr. Agnew, Philadelphia Museum of Art

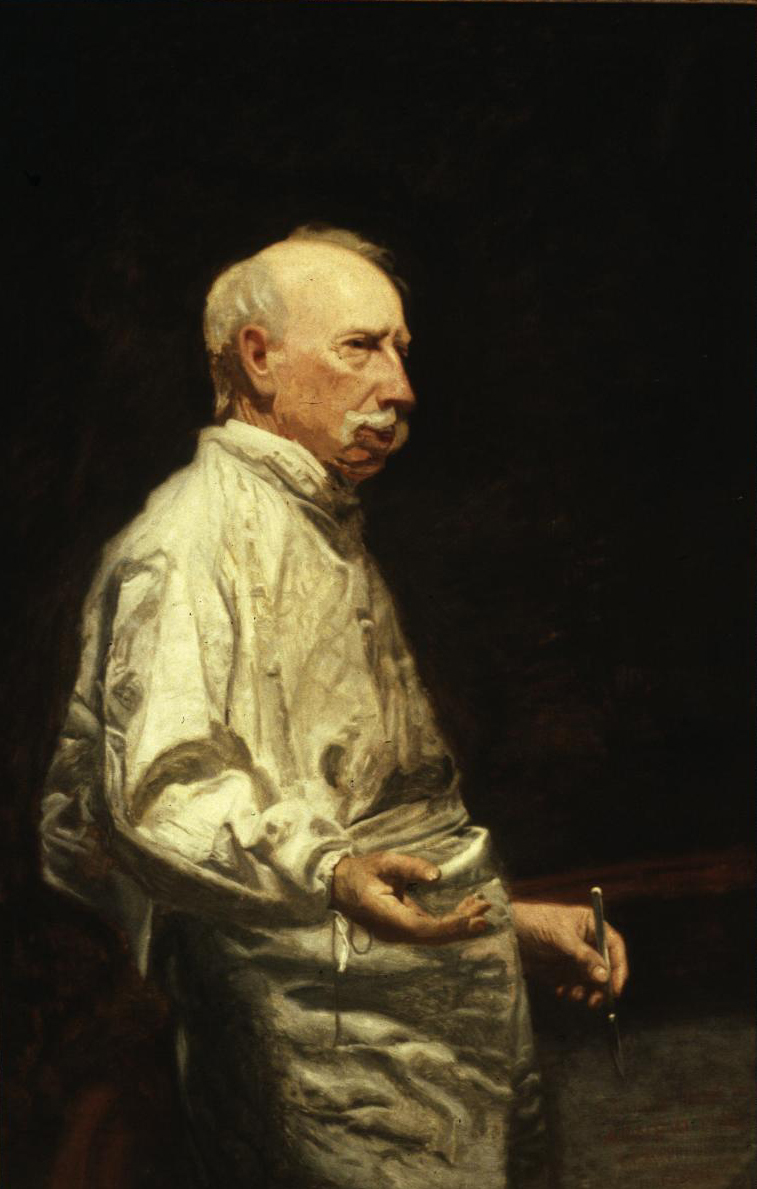
G-237. Oil study of Dr. Agnew, Yale University Art Gallery

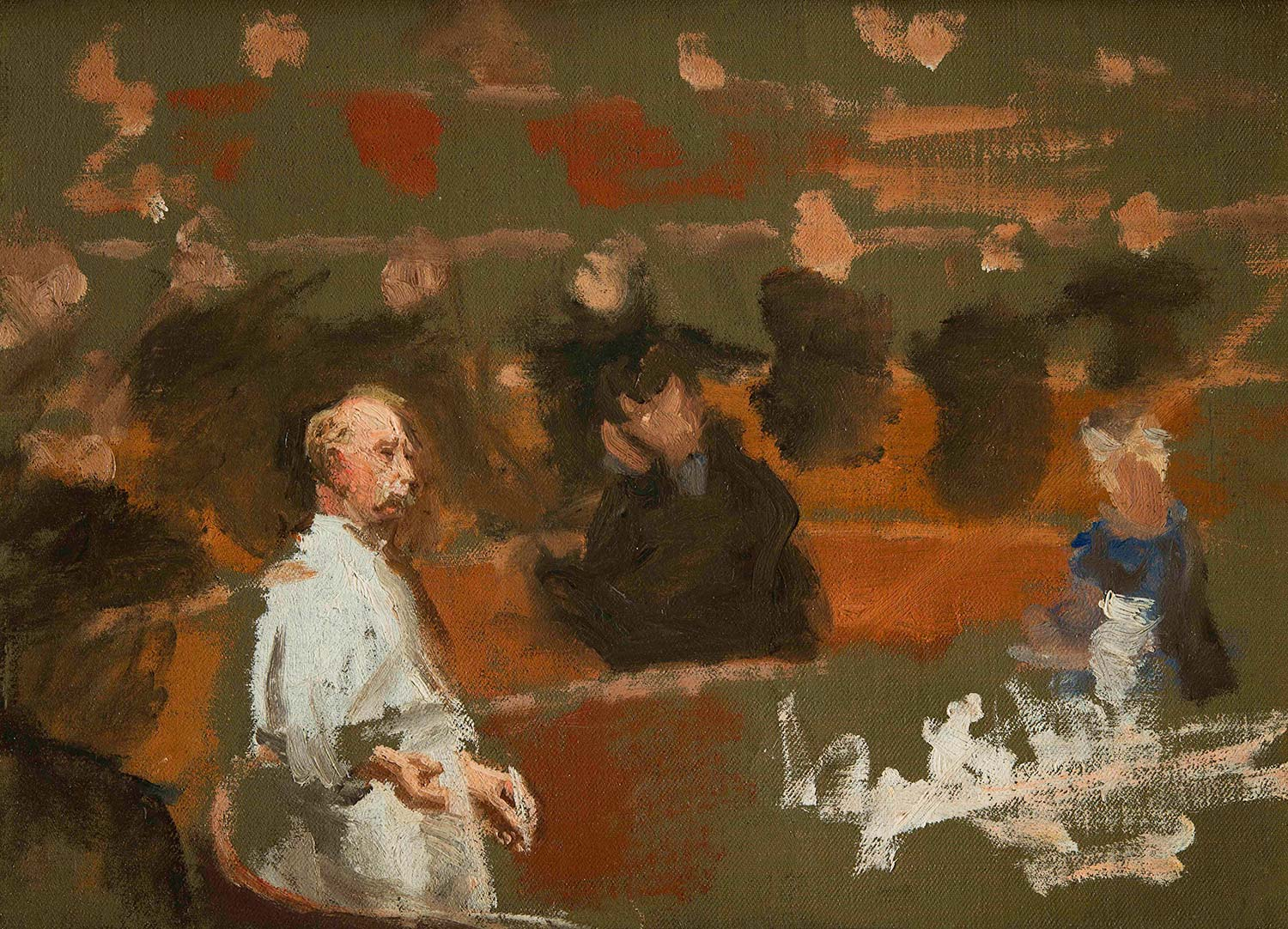
G-236. Compositional sketch, Virginia Museum of Fine Arts

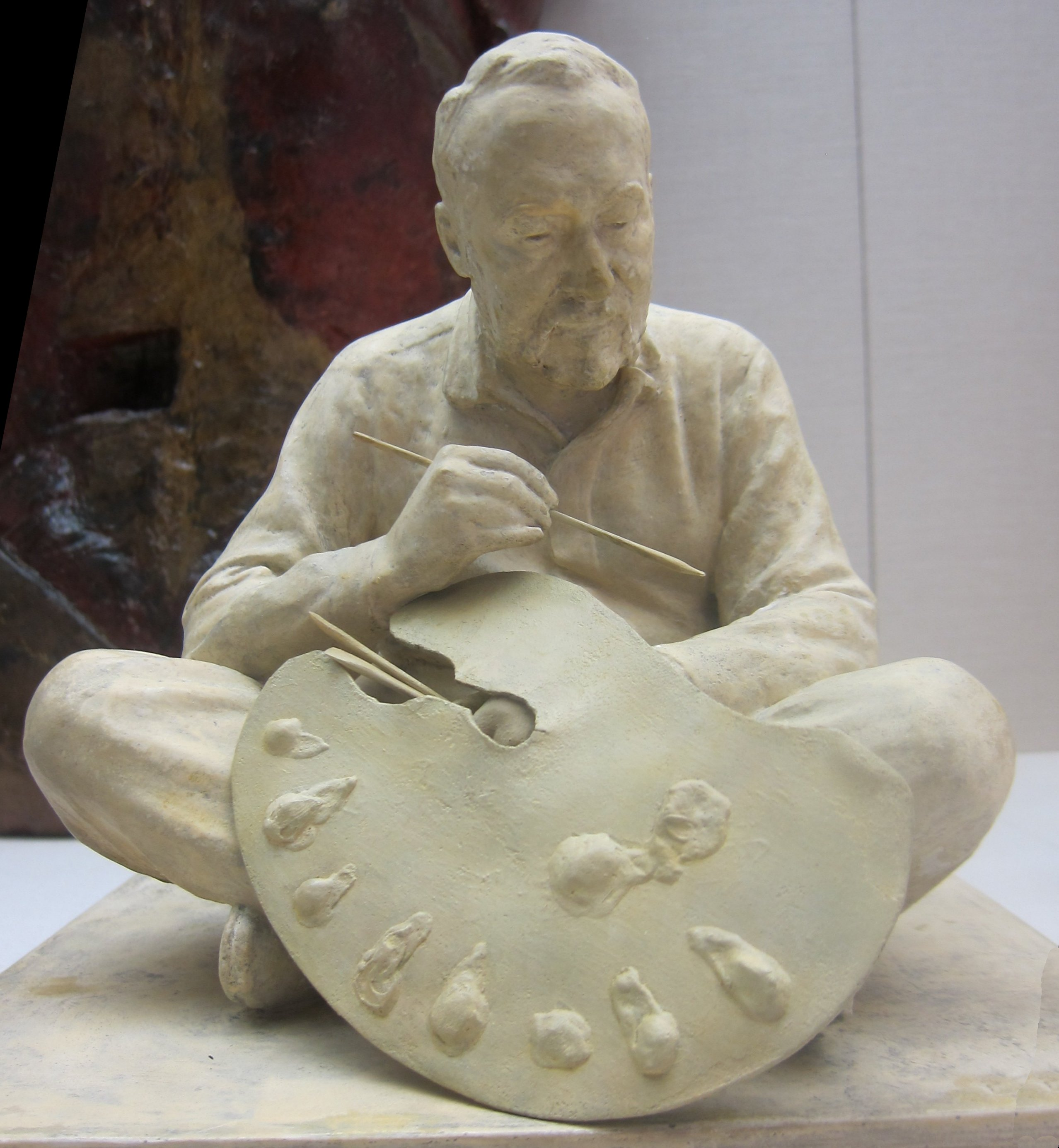
Statuette: Thomas Eakins at work on The Agnew Clinic (1889) by Samuel Murray.

== See also ==
- List of works by Thomas Eakins

== Sources ==
- Sidney Kirkpatrick. The Revenge of Thomas Eakins. Yale University Press, 2006, ISBN 978-0-300-10855-2.
