= National Collegiate Emergency Medical Services Foundation =

The National Collegiate Emergency Medical Services Foundation (NCEMSF) is a non-profit organization founded to promote and advocate for campus-based emergency medical services. The organization was founded in 1993 (32 years ago) with the goal of facilitating the exchange of information amongst collegiate EMS agencies. In 1994, NCEMSF held the first of its annual conferences, which have since become a cornerstone of the organization.

== Annual Conference ==
Since 1994, the NCEMSF has held a yearly conference hosted by a member college or university.

Year	Month/Day	Location	Host School(s)	Notes
2017		Baltimore, MD	Johns Hopkins Emergency Response Organization (HERO)	
2016	February 26–28	Philadelphia, PA		
2015	February 27-March 1	Baltimore, MD		
2014	February 28-March 2	Boston, MA		
2013	February 22–24	Washington, D.C.		20th Anniversary
2012	February 24–26	Baltimore, MD	Johns Hopkins Emergency Response Organization (HERO)	
2011	February 25–27	Philadelphia, PA		
2010	February 26–28	Baltimore, MD	Johns Hopkins Emergency Response Organization (HERO)	
2009	February 27 - March 1	Washington, D.C.	The George Washington University and Georgetown University	
2008	February 29 - March 2	Philadelphia, PA	University of Pennsylvania, Rowan University, and Villanova University	15th Anniversary
2007	February 23–25	Baltimore, MD	UMBC & Johns Hopkins Emergency Response Organization (HERO)	
2006	February 24–26	Boston, MA	Brandeis Univ., Boston Univ., Massachusetts Inst. of Tech., and Tufts Univ.	
2005	February 25–27	Philadelphia, PA	Villanova Univ. & Ursinus College	
2004	February 27–29	Baltimore, MD	Johns Hopkins Emergency Response Organization (HERO)	
2003	February 21–23	Washington, DC	George Washington University	
2002	November 8–10	Dayton, OH	University of Dayton	Regional Conference
2002	February 8–10	Long Island, NY	SUNY Stony Brook	
2001	February 9–11	Rochester, NY	Rochester Institute of Technology	
2000	February 11–13	Newark, Delaware	University of Delaware	
1999	February 12–14	Syracuse, NY	Syracuse University	
1998	April 17–19	Hartford, CT	Trinity College / University of Hartford	
1997	June 10–14	Huntington, WV	Marshall University	
1996	October 11–14	Troy, NY	Rensselaer Polytechnic Institute	
1996	March 22–24	New York, NY	Fordham University	Regional Conference
1995	November 3–5	Philadelphia, PA	Villanova University	
1994	April 8–10	Washington, DC	Georgetown University	

== Membership ==
The following agencies are active NCEMSF members:

- Alfred University: Alfred University Rescue Squad (AURS), Alfred, New York
- American University: American University First Response Team (AUFRT), Washington, D.C.
- Amherst College: Amherst College Emergency Medical Services (ACEMS), Amherst, Massachusetts
- Binghamton University: Harpur’s Ferry Student Volunteer Ambulance Service, Binghamton, New York
- Brown University: Brown University EMS (BEMS), Providence, Rhode Island
- Carnegie Mellon University: Carnegie Mellon University Emergency Medical Service (CMUEMS), Pittsburgh
- Case Western Reserve University: Case Western Reserve University Emergency Medical Services (CWRU EMS), Cleveland
- Clark University: Clark University Emergency Medical Services (CUEMS), Worcester, Massachusetts
- College of Charleston: College of Charleston EMS (COFCEMS), Charleston, South Carolina
- Fordham University: Fordham University Emergency Medical Service (FUEMS), The Bronx, New York City
- Georgetown University: Georgetown Emergency Response Medical Service (GERMS), Washington, D.C.
- Indiana University Bloomington: Intra Collegiate Emergency Medical Service at IU (IC-EMS), Bloomington, IN
- Johns Hopkins University: Hopkins Emergency Response Organization (HERO) (HERO), Baltimore
- Loyola Marymount University: Loyola Marymount University EMS (LMU EMS), Los Angeles
- Massachusetts Institute of Technology: Massachusetts Institute of Technology Emergency Medical Services (MIT EMS), Cambridge, Massachusetts
- Rensselaer Polytechnic Institute: RPI Ambulance (RPIA), Troy, New York
- Rice University: Rice University EMS (REMS), Houston
- Rochester Institute of Technology: RIT Ambulance (RITA), Rochester, New York
- Santa Clara University: Santa Clara University EMS (SCU EMS), Santa Clara, California
- Stony Brook University: Stony Brook Volunteer Ambulance Corps (SBVAC), Stony Brook, New York
- SUNY Albany: Five Quad VAS, Albany, New York
- SUNY Oswego: Student Association Volunteer Ambulance Corps of SUNY Oswego Inc. (SAVAC), Oswego, New York
- SUNY Oneonta: Oneonta State Emergency Squad (OSES), Oneonta, New York
- Syracuse University: Syracuse University ambulance, Syracuse, New York
- Temple University: Temple University EMS, Philadelphia
- The George Washington University: GW EMS / Emergency Medical Response Group (EMeRG), Washington, D.C.
- University of Colorado Boulder: Colorado University Emergency Medical Services (CUEMS), Boulder, Colorado
- University of Delaware: University of Delaware Emergency Care Unit (UDECU), Newark, Delaware
- University of Texas at Austin: Longhorn EMS (LEMS), Austin, Texas
- University of Texas at Dallas: University Emergency Medical Response (UEMR), Richardson, Texas
- University of Dayton: https://udayton.edu/publicsafety/ems/squad/index.php, Dayton, Ohio
- Ursinus College: Ursinus College Emergency Medical Services/Quick Response Service 393 (UC EMS/QRS 393), Collegeville, Pennsylvania
- Washington University in St. Louis: Emergency Support Team (EST), St. Louis
