= University of Pennsylvania School of Nursing =

Nursing school in Philadelphia, U.S.

- Former name: University Hospital Training School for Nurses
- Type: Private
- Established: 1935
- Parent institution: University of Pennsylvania
- Academic affiliations: University of Pennsylvania Health System, American Association of Colleges of Nursing
- President: J. Larry Jameson
- Dean: Antonia M. Villarruel
- Faculty: 53
- Students: 1275
- Undergraduates: 650
- Location: Claire M. Fagin Hall, 418 Curie Boulevard, Philadelphia, Pennsylvania, U.S. 39.94786°N 75.19806°W
- Campus: Urban
- Website: www.nursing.upenn.edu

The University of Pennsylvania School of Nursing (more commonly referred to as Penn Nursing) is an undergraduate and graduate institution at the University of Pennsylvania, located in Philadelphia. Penn's nursing education began with the Hospital of the University of Pennsylvania's nurse training program in 1886. The university's collegiate nursing degree program began in 1935.

According to U.S. News & World Report, the School of Nursing at Penn is among the top-ranked undergraduate and graduate nursing schools in the United States. The School of Nursing receives approximately $480 million in funding from the National Institutes of Health, and has been described as among the most highly funded nursing schools in the country.

== History ==
The University of Pennsylvania's nursing education program was initiated in 1886 with the establishment of a nurse training program at the Hospital of the University of Pennsylvania. The university's collegiate nursing degree program began in 1935 when the board of trustees authorized a department of nursing education in the school of education, following a request from the Pennsylvania State Nurses Association.

In 1944, the university established a degree-granting nursing program within the Division of Medical Affairs at the medical school. The trustees authorized a basic collegiate school of nursing with a program leading to a Bachelor of Science in Nursing (BSN) degree. In 1950, Penn's nursing programs merged to form the independent School of Nursing at the University of Pennsylvania.

In 1961, the trustees authorized the establishment of a Graduate Division, offering programs leading to a Master of Science in Nursing (MSN) degree.

After accepting responsibility for the Hospital of the University of Pennsylvania in 1973, the board of trustees voted in early 1974 to close the hospital's nurse training school, which had operated since 1886.

Claire M. Fagin served as dean of Penn Nursing from 1977 to 1992 and later served as interim President of the University of Pennsylvania from 1993 to 1994.

In February 2022, the school announced the Leonard A. Lauder Community Care Nurse Practitioner Program. The program is funded by a $125 million donation from Leonard A. Lauder of Estée Lauder. It covers tuition and fees for fellows in Penn Nursing's two-year primary care nurse practitioner program and requires participants to commit to practicing in an underserved community for two years after graduation. Contemporary reports described the donation as the largest gift made to a U.S. nursing school.

In November 2025, Penn Nursing marked the 75th anniversary of the School of Nursing as an independent institution within the University of Pennsylvania.

== Facilities ==
Penn Nursing's main building, Claire M. Fagin Hall, is located south of the center of campus. Within a block of Fagin Hall are the Hospital of the University of Pennsylvania, the Children's Hospital of Philadelphia, and buildings of the Perelman School of Medicine.

The Tri-Nursing Education Building (or Tri-NEB), originally built in 1972, was later named for Claire M. Fagin, a former dean of Penn Nursing. The building was renamed Claire M. Fagin Hall in 2006.

The building originally housed the instructional and administrative space for the Hospital of the University of Pennsylvania's hospital-based nurse training school, which operated from 1886 until the graduation of its final class in 1978, following the University's decision in 1974 to close the diploma program.

== Academics ==
=== Degree programs ===
At the undergraduate level, the School of Nursing offers traditional and accelerated Bachelor of Science in Nursing programs. From October 2014 through September 2015, the NCLEX first-time test-takers pass rate was 93.04%. While Yale University and Columbia University also have nursing programs, Penn is the only Ivy League institution to offer a baccalaureate nursing program.

Penn Nursing offers graduate programs including the Master of Professional Nursing (MPN), multiple Master of Science in Nursing (MSN) specialty programs, and the Master of Science in Nutrition Science (MSNS), as well as Doctor of Nursing Practice (DNP) and PhD programs.

Students can also earn joint degrees from the School of Nursing and other schools in the University of Pennsylvania. Options include the Nursing and Health Care Management program with the Wharton School, leading to a BSN and a Bachelor of Science in economics.

== Notable people ==
=== Faculty ===
- Linda Aiken, health services researcher
- Claire Fagin, Dean Emerita, served as dean of Penn Nursing (1977-1992) and as interim president of the University of Pennsylvania (1993-1994), and was described as the first woman to lead an Ivy League institution
- Sarah H. Kagan, gerontological nurse and MacArthur fellow

=== Alumni ===
- Mary V. Clymer, author of the nursing diary collection The Clymer Diaries
- Ruth Lubic, nurse midwife and MacArthur fellow
- Paule Valery Joseph, distinguished Venezuelan-Haitian-American nurse-scientist, and senior Investigator at the National Institutes of Health (NIH).
- Sheldon D. Fields, first black male to graduate from Penn Nursing with a doctoral degree
- Anthony Scarpone-Lambert, nurse entrepreneur, inventor of uNight Light, cofounder and CEO of ADNI, career community for nurses & allied health

== Research centers ==
- Barbara Bates Center for the Study of the History of Nursing
- Center for Global Women's Health
- Center for Health Outcomes and Policy Research
- NewCourtland Center for Transitions and Health

== See also ==
- University of Pennsylvania
- Hospital of the University of Pennsylvania
- Guatemala Health Initiative, a University of Pennsylvania-affiliated private aid organization; partners with the School of Nursing in program delivery
