= Moe Brooker =

African American artist (1940–2022)

- Born: September 24, 1940; Philadelphia, Pennsylvania, U.S.
- Died: January 9, 2022 (aged 81)
- Education: Pennsylvania Academy of the Fine Arts; Tyler School of Art, Temple University
- Known for: Painter, printmaker, teacher
- Spouse: Cheryl McClenney-Brooker
- Website: https://www.moebrooker.net/

External videos
- IN THE STUDIO – Honoring Moe Brooker, Moore College of Art on YouTube, April 10, 2012, 27:51
- A Morning With: Moe Brooker, Bruce Pinchbeck on YouTube, January 15, 2010, 2:24

Moe Albert Brooker (September 24, 1940 – January 9, 2022) was an African-American painter, educator and printmaker. An abstract artist, he used vivid colors, lines, stripes, squares and circles to infuse a feeling of improvisational jazz in his works. Brooker was an internationally known artist whose paintings are in the collections of major museums and other institutions.

== Early life and education ==
Brooker was born in Philadelphia on Sept. 24, 1940, to the Rev. Mack Henry Brooker Sr., an AME minister, and Lumisher E. Brooker, a community leader and political activist. He was named after a family friend who died in World War II. His father was from South Carolina, moved to Philadelphia and got a theology degree from Temple University. He also worked as a mechanic to support his family of seven children.

Brooker grew up in South Philadelphia and stuttered as a child (an impediment he overcame when he was a student at the Pennsylvania Academy of the Fine Arts). He graduated from South Philadelphia High School and received a scholarship to attend the academy. He enrolled in 1959 – two years after artist Louis B. Sloan graduated – and was there until 1963, earning a certificate in painting.

The Pennsylvania Academy had not been a welcoming place for Sloan and Raymond Saunders, two Black students who preceded Brooker in the 1950s, Brooker said. They advised him and the new Black students on ways to survive: work hard and don't mess around, win the school's traveling scholarships and make their place in the art world. Both of them had received traveling scholarships to Europe. Saunders also insisted that he go to graduate school so he could teach, earn a living and paint every day.

Brooker was also influenced by Morris Blackburn, who had attended the academy in the 1920s, who introduced him to the works of Dox Thrash and artist Charles Pridgen. Pridgen used Cubism in his works, which is exemplified in his 1950 painting “The Blues,” in the collection of the African American Museum in Philadelphia.

Among his classmates at the academy was Ellen Powell Tiberino, who was few years ahead of him.

While at PAFA, Brooker often visited the Philadelphia Museum of Art where he encountered Julius Bloch’s “Stevedore.” It was the first positive depiction of a Black man he had ever seen. He was influenced by it, just as he was by Rembrandt’s realistic images of Africans that Brooker later saw in his trips to the Netherlands.

Brooker was awarded the William Emlen Cresson Memorial Traveling Scholarship in 1962, just as Saunders had in 1956. After receiving a certificate from PAFA in 1963, he was drafted into the Army and spent a year in Korea, from 1964 to 1965. It was there where he saw vivid colors in a funeral procession that left a deep impression on him.

Brooker enrolled at the Tyler School of Art at Temple University, obtaining bachelor's and master's degrees in fine arts in 1970 and 1972, respectively. As a graduate student, he taught silkscreen printing at the Brandywine Workshop, a stint that improved his skills as a printmaker and teacher. He would return to Brandywine years later to produce prints.

He spent a year at Tyler's program in Rome in 1968–1969.

== Evolution of his style ==
Brooker was the youngest in a family of children who could all draw. He didn't draw lollipop trees like the other children in his elementary classes. His trees had branches, and his people had arms, fingers and faces. He always wanted to be an artist, although his father tried to dissuade him. As a child, he used chalk to draw Batman, Captain Marvel and Green Hornet figures on the pavement streets. After school, when he was about 11 or 12, he spent time at St. Martha's House, a community center, where he gravitated toward art classes.

Among his influencers were members of his family: He imitated the drawings of his older siblings, was enamored with the stylings of his jazz pianist brother Mitch Avery (who was named after his father but chose a stage name so he wouldn't embarrass him), and marveled at the patterns and colors in his grandmother's hand-sewn quilts.

Brooker's earliest works were figurative, and his subjects were taken from the church: parishioners in the pews, men nodding off to sleep, young couples and grandmothers, a woman shouting in the back, the women's hats.

He wasn't taught color in his art classes, so he decided to seek it out on his own. He found the books of Russian abstract artist Wassily Kandinsky and started experimenting. He was painting semi-abstract works while teaching at the University of North Carolina in Chapel Hill in the mid-1970s. He hit a dry spell, but was re-energized on a trip back to Philadelphia. He commuted from Chapel Hill to Philadelphia where his family lived.

Driving through the city, he saw graffiti on the buildings – abstract drawings of shapes, colors, letters that seemed to pulsate with energy. He saw pride and anger in the works, and incorporated those emotions into his own. He went one step farther and added lines to connect what looked like disparate parts into a unified statement. By the late 1970s, he had begun to find his voice.

Color was energy, he explained, as represented in the minister's preaching and the gospel choir's singing. He began to relate the graffiti to music, which had been a large part of his life. He understood the structure of music and began to use it in the narratives of his paintings.

“The point about abstraction is you develop your own language. Language becomes pretty important to me. Why? The mystery of language is that it’s 26 letters and yet from those letters because you can combine and re-combine them you can make an infinite number of words. I think the same thing about the elements you use in terms of making drawings. Line, point, shape, value, color, form. You can take and begin to use them in new ways each time and then create something new and something different.”

It would take seven years for him to complete the transformation to professionalism. He sold his first abstract painting, “A Struggle to be,” to a gallery in Shaker Heights, OH. The Black-owned Malcolm Brown Gallery in that city often exhibited and sold works by African American artists.

While teaching at the Cleveland Institute of Art, Brooker won first prize for his painting “Afternoon Delight II” in the Cleveland Museum of Art’s annual May Show in 1978. He won again in 1981 and in 1985, he was winner of the Cleveland Arts Prize.

The award was the impetus for a show at the Robert L. Kidd Associates, Inc. Galleries in Birmingham, MI, where all of his works sold out and his prices increased. “If jazz could be expressed in purely visual terms, it might look like Brooker’s works – a series of improvisations laid over a recognizable structure,” wrote one reviewer. Another noted that his titles were laced with folk wisdom: “Slow Motion Monday,” “What goes round comes round,” “There’s nothing to do but Today, “I can’t dance and it’s too wet, I can’t plow.“

Brooker created mixed-media works on canvas and paper using acrylics, base coat, oils, oil sticks and encaustic, an Egyptian medium that combined hot wax with color. As a printmaker, he participated in a yearlong project at the Maryland institute College of Art in 1987 to produce silkscreen prints. His works and those of five other artists were featured in an exhibit titled “Painters Make Prints.”

Brooker signed his works with the lettering “TTGG,” or “To the Glory of God,” much the same as Johann Sebastian Bach had done. The composer signed his compositions “S. D. G.” It is a Latin term for Soli Deo Gloria or “to the Glory of God alone.”

== Art and teaching careers ==
Brooker was a nationally and internationally recognized teacher. After graduate school in 1972, he taught at Tyler for one year. In 1974, he became an assistant professor at the University of Virginia in Charlottesville. The next year he was hired in the senior position of associate professor at the University of North Carolina. He participated in faculty shows and external exhibits during his stints at both schools.

In 1978, he began teaching at the Cleveland Institute of Art as an associate professor in painting and drawing, and remained there until 1985. He was its first Black faculty member. Again, he exhibited in faculty shows and museums, and was commissioned to create artwork for the newly built Hough Branch Library in Cleveland. He had a one-man show at the institute in 1978. It was here where he won the prizes in the Cleveland Museum of Art competitions.

In 1985, he got married and returned to Philadelphia, where he was hired for a teaching position at the Pennsylvania Academy of the Fine Arts. In 1986, he was represented in an exhibit at the Sichuan Fine Arts Institute and the Tianjin Academy of Fine Arts in China as part of an east–west exchange orchestrated by the Cheltenham (PA) Center for the Arts. A year later, he was one of three artists awarded two-month grants to teach at the Tianjin academy and travel throughout the country. The grant was sponsored by the City of Philadelphia.

After returning to the United States, the three gave a talk about their trip at the Philadelphia Art Alliance. The works they created in China and afterward were on display at the Nexus Foundation for Today's Art. Brooker also exhibited some of those works at the Malcolm Brown Gallery in Ohio.

Brooker took a position as the chair of the Foundation program at the Parson School of Design in New York in 1990, where he stayed until 1994. He became a faculty member at the Moore College of Art & Design in 1995, first as a teacher and then as chair of its Foundations program. He traveled across the country to review portfolios and recruit high school students for the school. In 2011, he received the Penny and Bob Fox Distinguished Professorship at Moore, its first endowed professorship. Brooker retired from Moore in 2012.

Brooker conducted workshops at several art colonies: the Mississippi Art Colony at Camp Henry Jacobs in Utica (MS) in 1996 and the Tougaloo Art Colony (AL) in 2004.

Brooker was also a mentor to many artists. In one instance, he showed his abstracts in a 2004 exhibit along with 13 artists with whom he had been meeting to discuss their works and offer feedback. The show was held at the Atelier Fine Art Gallery in Frenchtown, NJ.

== Service to the arts community ==
Brooker served on the Philadelphia Art Commission during two controversial periods. He was a member of the commission in 2006 when it was considering whether to return the “Rocky” statue to the steps of the Philadelphia Museum of Art. Brooker opposed the move. He labeled the statue - which was used in Sylvester Stallone's 1976 “Rocky” movie – a prop and not art. The commission voted to place it in a spot near the steps of the museum.

He was chairman of the committee in 2009 when it considered a design for a new building to house the Barnes Foundation. There had been a lengthy fight in the courts over transferring the collection from Merion, PA, in the suburbs of Philadelphia to Benjamin Franklin Parkway among other major city museums. A new building was built on the Parkway and the Barnes was re-located.

He was on a committee to determine what artwork would be placed in the new Pennsylvania Convention Center in 1992. He was commissioned in 2017 to do a painting to hang in the center, titling it “Amazing Grace.” His painting “Everything Is On Its Way To Somewhere” was chosen to be hung at the Kimmel Center for the Performing Arts in Philadelphia in 2006.

== Member of Recherche ==
Brooker was a member of a cooperative of Black artists called Recherche, which means “intensely sought-after, choice, rare.” It was founded in 1983 after an exhibit of Black artists at the Cheltenham Center for the Arts. The founders were Syd Carpenter, James Dupree, Carolyn Hayward-Jackson, Richard Jordan, Charles Searles, Hubert C. Taylor and Andrew Turner. Among the other members was Leroy Johnson, who joined in 1993.

The aim of the coalition was to show that Black artists worked in a diversity of mediums, styles and subjects; to dispel the myth of the so-called “Black artist,” and to encourage young aspiring artists of color. Recherche was also formed because Black artists were largely left out of most exhibitions at museums, galleries and alternative spaces. Collectively, the members organized exhibits and projects on their own.

Brooker traveled with Recherche to Brazil in 1989 to exhibit and celebrate the centennial of its abolition of slavery and to Denmark in 1986. The Danes returned the visit by coming to Philadelphia for an exhibit at the Port of History Museum two months later. Recherche members held exhibits in Dallas in 1991, and at the African American Museum in Philadelphia, the Moore College of Art & Design and Hampton University Museum.

== Commissions and exhibitions ==
Brooker received a major commission in 2014 to create windows for an elevator tower at the Long Island Railroad building in Wyandanch, NY. He produced 12 stained-glass windows 10 feet tall by 7 feet wide in an abstract pattern. The Pennsylvania Convention Center commissioned him to create a huge canvas that was unveiled in April 2021.

Brooker also made a commemorative and fundraising poster for the Odunde Festival in 1995. He participated in a project to bring art to the people by producing posters that were erected at city bus-stop shelters. His was titled “Open Secret.” He was also commissioned to do an ad in 1992 for Absolut Vodka.

In the mid-1980s, he completed a residency at the Fabric Workshop and Museum in Philadelphia. In 2011, he presented a fabric scarf for its “Close at Hand: Philadelphia Artists from the Permanent Collection” exhibit.

In 1971, he was in an exhibit at the Philadelphia Recreation Department's Lee Cultural Center titled “Young, Gifted and Black.” One of his abstracts won first prize. The show was produced with the Urban Outreach Department at the Philadelphia Museum of Art with an aim of highlighting the talents of young Black artists in the Philadelphia metropolitan area who faced difficulty getting their works before the public.

== Death ==
Brooker died on January 9, 2022.

== Selected awards ==
- James Van Der Zee Lifetime Achievement Award, Brandywine Workshop, 2003
- Conrad Nelson Fellowship, Millersville University, 2004
- Artists of the City Award, Painted Bride Art Center, 2008
- Medal of Achievement, Philadelphia Art Alliance, 2009
- Artist of the Year Award (Hazlett Memorial Award), from Pennsylvania Gov. Ed Rendell, 2010
- Artists Equity Award, 2010
- Honoree, African American Museum in Philadelphia, 35th anniversary celebration, 2011

== Selected collections ==
- Philadelphia Museum of Art
- Cleveland Museum of Art
- Ford Motor Co.
- Pennsylvania Academy of the Fine Arts
- African American Museum in Philadelphia
- Brandywine Workshop
- Fabric Workshop and Museum
- Studio Museum in Harlem
- Montgomery Museum of Fine Arts
- Musée des Beaux-arts de l’Ontario
- Xerox Corporation
- General Motors
- La Salle University Art Museum
- Lauren Rogers Museum of Art
- Woodmere Art Museum
- Hampton University Museum
- Museum of the Château de Monbéliard, France
- Spritmuseum, Stockholm, Sweden
- Kimmel Center for the Performing Arts, Philadelphia
- Philadelphia Convention Center

== Selected exhibitions ==
- William Penn Memorial Museum, 1966
- Lincoln University, 1969
- Lee Cultural Center, Philadelphia Department of Recreation, 1971
- Philadelphia Civic Center, 1973
- Rosemont College, 1974, 2018
- University of North Carolina, Ackland Art Center, 1974
- University of Virginia Art Museum, 1974
- Cleveland Institute of Art, 1978
- Woodmere Art Museum, 1979
- Scottsdale Center for the Arts, 1980
- Robert L. Kidd Associates Inc. Galleries, 1980, 1984, 1986, 1989
- Ohio University-Lancaster, 1984
- Akron Art Museum, 1984
- Fleischer Art Memorial, 1986
- Malcolm Brown Gallery, 1984
- Pennsylvania Academy of the Fine Arts, 1986, 2003
- Brandywine Workshop, 1987
- Port of History Museum, 1987
- June Kelly Gallery, 1990, 1997, 2001, 2006, 2013, 2016, 2021
- Moore School of Art and Design, 1990, 2008, 2011
- Sande Webster Gallery, 1990, 1993, 1996, 2004, 2008, 2010, 2011
- Hampton University Museum, 1992
- 33rd Street Armory, Philadelphia, 1997
- African American Museum in Philadelphia, 2000
- Spelman College Museum of Fine Art, 2000
- Philadelphia Museum of Art, 2000, 2015
- Charles H. Wright Museum of African American History, 2000
- Millersville University 2004
- Lauren Rogers Museum of Art, 2009
- La Salle University Art Museum, 2011
- Delaware Art Museum, 2018
- Spanek Gallery, 2018
- The Phillips Collection, 2020
