= James Sheehan =

James Sheehan may refer to:

- Jim Sheehan (1885–1967), Australian politician
- James Sheehan (Rhode Island politician) (born 1966), American state legislator in Rhode Island
- James J. Sheehan (born 1937), historian of Germany
- James Sheehan (artist) (born 1964), contemporary American artist
- Jim Sheehan (baseball) (1913–2003), Major League Baseball catcher
- James P. Sheehan, Wisconsin politician
