= Chief Charles A. Joshua Plaza =

Plaza in Brooklyn, New York

Coordinates: 40.679052°N 73.921651°W

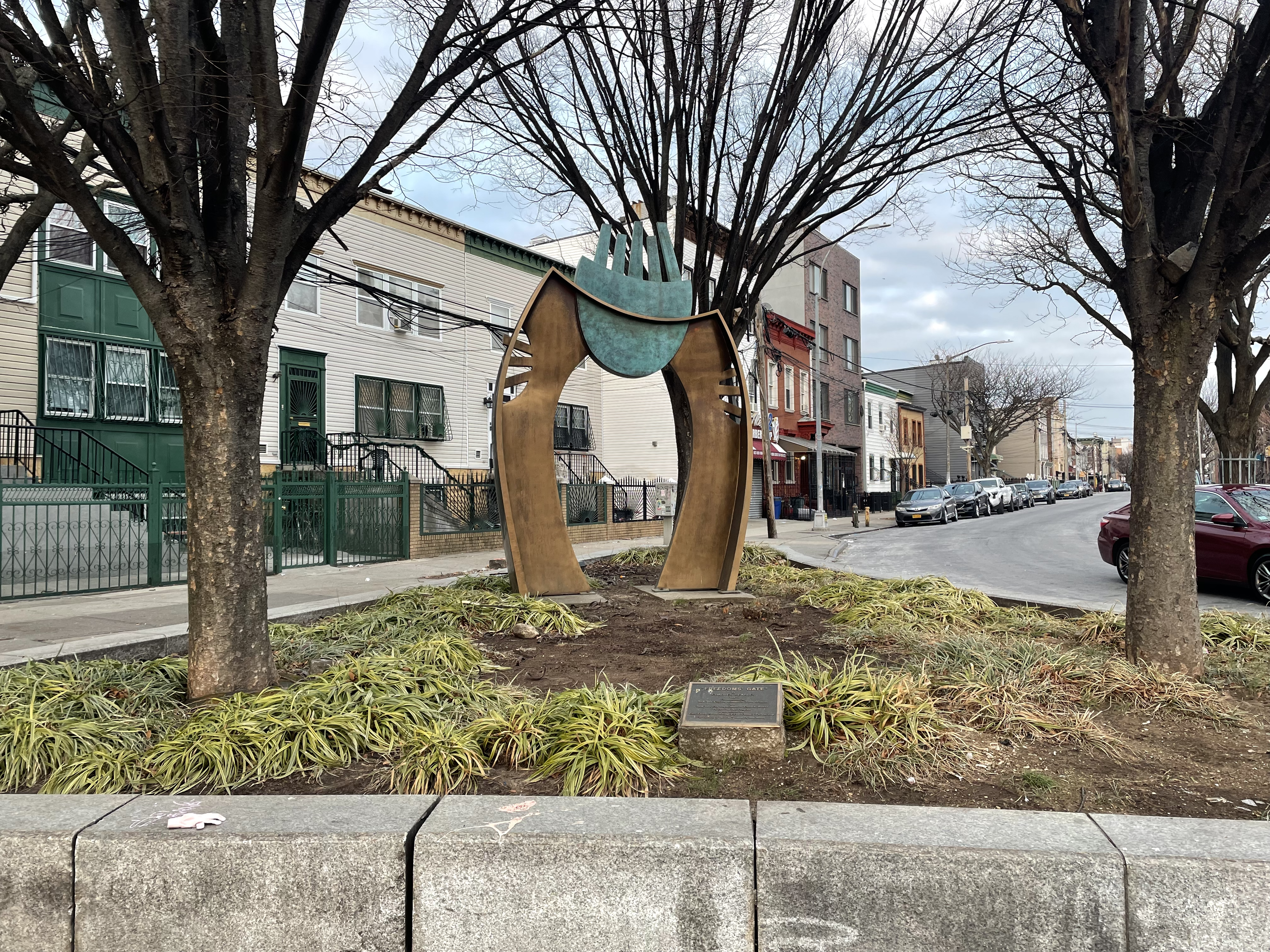

Chief Charles A. Joshua Plaza is a .22-acre public space located at the crossroads of Ralph Avenue, Fulton Street and Macdougal Street in the Bedford-Stuyvesant neighborhood of Brooklyn. The plaza's namesake, Chief Charles Adebowale Joshua (1924-1999) was a community activist who led efforts to stimulate cooperation among the neighborhood's numerous nonprofit organizations, including programs serving foster children, people with mental disabilities and people living with HIV and AIDS. Beginning in 1973, as Executive Director of the Central Brooklyn Coordinating Council, he worked to stimulate cooperation among more than 135 community agencies in implementing social programs benefiting local residents. Joshua was also a founder of the Caribbean-American Chamber of Commerce and Industry, an organization founded in 1985 to provide assistance to small businesses within the city's Caribbean immigrant community.

In 1989, Joshua's tireless activism earned him praise from Nigeria, where a Yoruba prince bestowed the title Chief on Joshua in a formal ceremony. In conjunction with that title, he adopted the middle name Adebowale, which in Yoruba translates to “the crown has come home.” Following his death in 1999, community leaders and local elected officials selected this plaza as a fitting location to honor Joshua. In 2001, the City Council passed legislation designating Chief Charles A. Joshua Plaza.

This plaza was reconstructed in 1997, providing a concrete border, four trees and the Freedom’s Gate sculpture by Charles Searles (1934-2004). Born in Philadelphia, his art captures the history and feelings of the African-American experience.
