= Kara Springer =

- Born: Barbados
- Education: Hon.B.Sc. in Life Sciences from the University of Toronto, B.Des. in Industrial Design from the Ontario College of Art & Design, and a MEDes in New Media and Contemporary Technology from ENSCI Les Ateliers in Paris.
- Website: www.karaspringer.ca

Kara Springer is a Canadian industrial designer and visual artist of Jamaican and Bajan heritage, who was born in Bridgetown, Barbados and raised in Southern Ontario, Canada.

== Career ==
Springer's name was featured on "Artists on Politics", a print art magazine, in the section titled, "Simone Leigh the group BLACK WOMEN ARTISTS for BLACK WOMEN ARTISTS MATTER in response to the continued inhumane institutionalized violence against Black lives". Springer's work has been exhibited in Germany at the Museum Angewandte Kunst, in Italy the Politecnico di Torino, the Cultural Centre of Belém in Portugal, and in the 2014 Jamaica Biennial.

== Works ==
=== Kaya Birth Stool, 2008 ===
Springer founded the Kaya Birth Stool 2008, which functions as a tool intended to provide comfort and assistance during birthing.

=== Translations, 2015 ===
Translations, created in collaboration with Christian Campbell, poet and cultural critic, was a multimedia installation that addressed concepts pertaining to memory, interdisciplinary practices, the archive, and aesthetics, it took place on April 8, 2015 at The Power Plant. Translations integrates image, text and sound, and operates as a tribute to Terry Adkins (1953–2014), a deceased American artist, in addition, to being a response to the parallel exhibit at The Power Plant, The Unfinished Conversation: Encoding/Decoding.

=== A Small Matter of Engineering (Part 2), 2016 ===
Springer created a sculpture titled, A Small Matter of Engineering (Part 2), which reads "White people. Do something," was installed in front of the Tyler School of Art in September 2016.
