= Steven Montgomery =

American artist (born 1954)

Steven Montgomery (born 1954 in Detroit) is an American artist most often associated with large scale ceramic sculpture suggesting industrial objects or mechanical detritus. He received a Bachelor of Philosophy degree from Grand Valley State University in Allendale, Michigan, and a Master of Fine Arts from the Tyler School of Art of Temple University in Philadelphia, Pennsylvania.

Montgomery's work includes ceramic pieces in the trompe-l'œil style, creating "an optical deceit that induces a false perceptual belief."

He has been awarded fellowships from the New York Foundation for the Arts (1990, 2006, 2009), the Pollock-Krasner Foundation (2004), and awards for ceramic sculpture at international exhibitions in Korea and Taiwan (2003, 2004). He is the first ceramic sculptor to receive a Smithsonian Artist Research Fellowship (2012) and is currently working as an artist in residence at the National Air and Space Museum in Washington, D.C.

His work is included in the collections of the Metropolitan Museum of Art and the Museum of Arts and Design in New York, the Smithsonian American Art Museum and the Corcoran Gallery of Art in Washington, D.C., and numerous other public and private collections throughout the United States and abroad. He has had major solo exhibitions at both the Everson Museum of Art in Syracuse, New York (1998) and at the Daum Museum of Contemporary Art in Sedalia, Missouri (2006).

He has lived and worked in New York City since 1980.
