= Amber Cowan =

American artist and educator

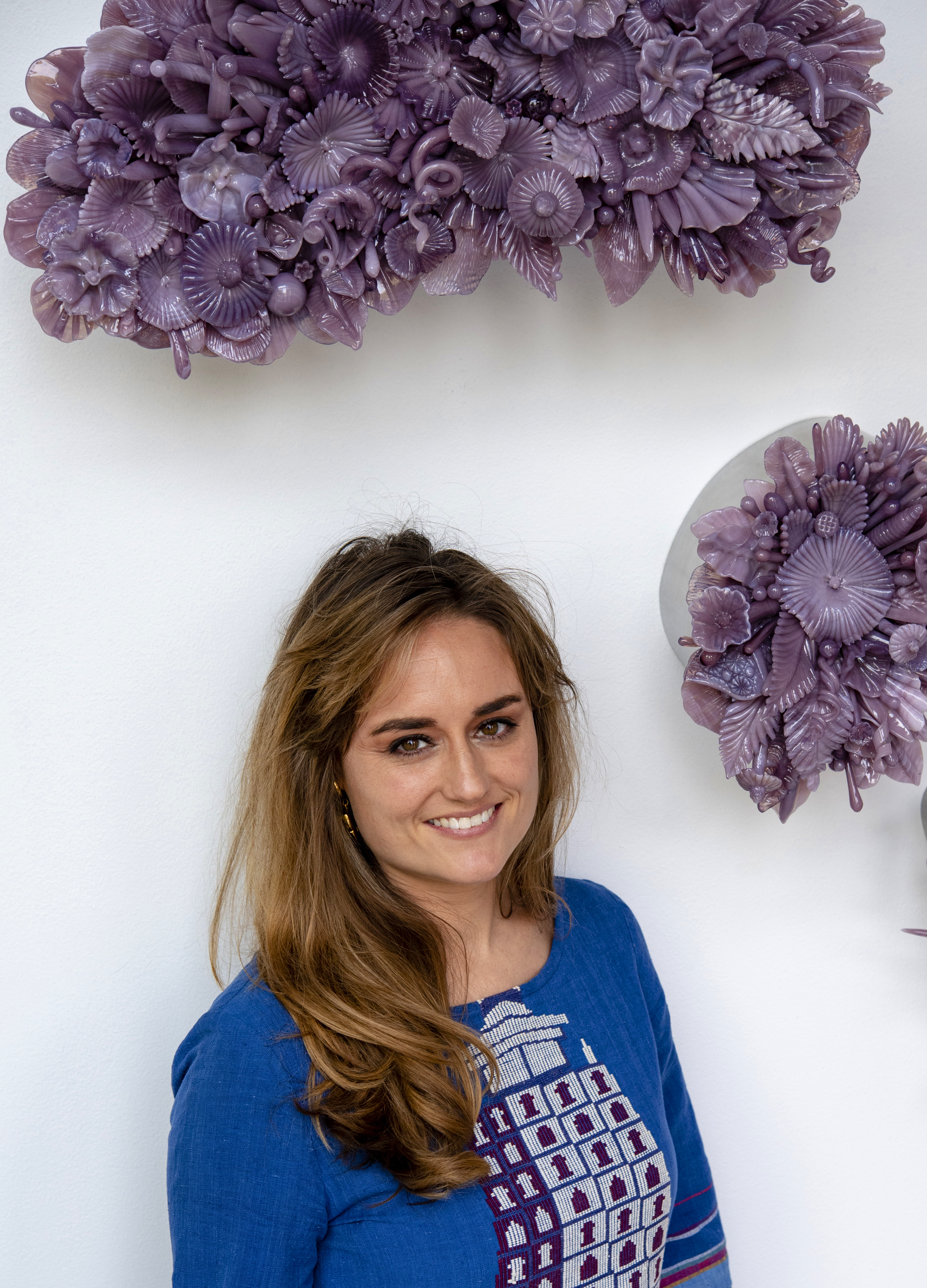
- Amber Cowan
- Born: 1981 (age 44–45)
- Education: Salisbury University, Tyler School of Art
- Known for: Glass
- Awards: International Procter Fellowship; 2012 The Toledo Workshop Revisited – Australian National University; Rakow Commission; 2014 Garden of the Forgotten and Extinct – Corning Museum of Glass
- Website: ambercowan.com

Amber Cowan (born 1981) is an American artist and educator living and working in Philadelphia. Cowan creates fused and flameworked glass sculptures from cullet and recycled industrial glass.

== Career ==
Cowan received her BFA in 3-Dimensional Design with an emphasis in Hot Glass from Salisbury University in 2004. She was the first woman to graduate from Salisbury University with this specific degree. She received her MFA in Glass/Ceramics from Tyler School of Art at Temple University in 2011.

She is currently a faculty member of the glass department at the Tyler School of Art, where she graduated with her MFA in Glass/Ceramics in 2011.

Cowan's work is included in the collections of the Corning Museum of Glass, the Rhode Island School of Design Museum, the Museum of Arts and Design, and the Shanghai Museum of Glass. She has been featured many times at the Heller Gallery in New York City, and the Museum of Craft and Design in San Francisco.

== Awards ==
In 2012, Cowan was the recipient of The Stephen Procter Fellowship from the Australian National University. This fellowship was created to help Australian and international artists broaden the scope of their education in working with glass by presenting opportunities to these recipients to study abroad. Because of this fellowship, Cowan was able to undertake a two-month residency in an esteemed glass workshop at the Australian National University in Canberra. Also in 2012 Cowan received The Tyler Alumni Award of Excellence during The Philadelphia Fibers Biennial.

In 2014, Cowan was awarded the 29th Rakow Commission for her work, Garden of the Forgotten and Extinct. The Commission is traditionally awarded to professional artists, from the United States and abroad, whose work is not currently represented in The Corning Museum of Glass' permanent collection.

== Selected works ==
- Basket (2012), New Glass Review 33
- Whole Milk Wash Basin in Colony Harvest (2013), Rhode Island School of Design Museum 3
- Rosaline (2) (2013), Shanghai Museum of Glass
- Garden of the Forgotten and Extinct (2014), Corning Museum of Glass
- Wedding Compote in Colony Harvest and Rosette in Milk and Ivory (2014), New Glass Review 35
- Garden of the Forgotten and Extinct (2015), New Glass Review 36
- The Fine Tint (2017), O: The Oprah Magazine
- Grotto of the Chocolate Nymph (2018), Toledo Museum of Art

== Selected exhibitions ==
- 2019 – Burke Prize Exhibition, Museum of Arts and Design, New York City.
- 2019 – Salacia – a solo exhibition, Heller Gallery, New York City.
- 2018 – A New State of Matter: Contemporary Glass, Boise Art Museum.
- 2018 – The Bleak and The Burgeoning, Walton Arts Center.
- 2017 – Re|Collection, Fuller Craft Museum.
- 2016 – Hush, Philadelphia Art Alliance.
- 2015 – COLOURS, Group ExhibitionThe Hempel Glass Museum in Denmark.
- 2015 – Chroma Revival, Heller Gallery. This was a solo exhibition.
- 2015 – Steuben and Glass Candlestick Exhibition at the Wichita Art Museum in Kansas.
- 2014 – Second Life Glass solo exhibition at The Museum of Craft and Design in San Francisco, CA.
- 2014 – Art Miami exhibition which was represented by Heller Gallery.
- 2014 – SOFA Chicago exhibition which was represented by Heller Gallery.
- 2014 – Contemporary Glass 21st Century Innovation exhibition at The New Britain Museum of American Art in New Britain, Connecticut.
- 2014 – Flora: A Celebration of Flowers in Contemporary Art, at The Brattleboro Museum & Art Center in Brattleboro, Vermont.
- 2014 – International Glass Exhibition: Breathing Through Transparency, at The China Academy of Art in Hangzhou, China.
- 2014 – Art Southampton exhibition which was represented by Heller Gallery in Hamptons, NY.
- 2014 – A Group Exhibition at The Shelburne Museum in Shelburne, Vermont.
- 2013 – SOFA Chicago exhibition which was represented by Heller Gallery.
- 2013 – Solo exhibition: Reconstructions, represented by Heller Gallery.
- 2013 – New Visions exhibition at the Wexler Gallery in Philadelphia, PA.
- 2013 – GlassWeekend exhibition in Millville, NJ represented by Heller Gallery.
- 2012 – SOFA Chicago exhibition which was represented by Heller Gallery.
- 2012 – Inside/Out exhibition hosted at The Philadelphia Fibers Biennial.
- 2012 – The Secret Life of Sand: An Artist Invitational at The Hatchory located in Philadelphia, PA.
- 2011 – Solo Exhibition: Peak and Valley, in the Temple Gallery at the Tyler School of Art for the MFA Thesis Exhibition.
- 2011 – Exhibition at Rosemont College: Philadelphia Women Working in Glass.
- 2011 – Exhibition at Hunter College in the Times Square Gallery, titled Vagabondage.
- 2010 – Exhibition Zodiak Down at the Little Berlin Gallery in Philadelphia, PA.
- 2009 – Exhibition Glas Under Glass at The Long Beach Island Foundation of the Arts in Loveladies, NJ.
- 2008 – The Artists of Urban Glass exhibition at The Robert Lehman Gallery in Brooklyn, NY.
- 2008 – The Instructors of Urban Glass exhibition at Long Island University in Brooklyn, NY.

== Installations ==
Along with the growing number of exhibitions Amber Cowan has been a part of, she has also been given opportunities to install some of her sculpture pieces in public spaces.

In 2014, Cowan was invited on two separate occasions to install her sculpture work in The Philadelphia International Airport.

== Technique ==
Cowan mainly works with discarded glass pieces, repurposing the vintage glass left behind from multiple 19th and 20th century American Glass Factories who shut their doors and left many remnants of production behind. A technique that is essential to her is flame-working, which is the manipulation of various rods and tubes of glass that will become malleable when heated to high temperatures. Cowan also participates in glass blowing and hot-sculpting.

Cowan states, "The material that I use is more 'found' then necessarily recycled. Most of the glass I use is 'cullet' that comes from an old factory that has now closed. Cullet is the factory scraps that get tossed into a pile after a production run of a particular colored piece they are creating. I take the scraps, re-melt them (usually) one at a time and create my own shape from them. So, in general I am not re-melting pieces that are already in a salable form. I do however incorporate pieces into my work that I have collected to tell a story, add volume, depth or pattern into the sculptures. I collect pieces that are the same color as the cullet that I am using. I get very excited if I find an unusual character piece in a particular color that I am working with at the time. People also send me boxes of old glass on a regular basis that I incorporate into my work." She often explores woman's experience as a central theme through fantastical landscape and other allegorical collage installations.
