= Leah Modigliani =

American artist

Leah Modigliani is an American and Canadian artist and art historian living in Philadelphia. Modigliani received an BFA in Studio Art from Concordia University in 1993, an MFA in Sculpture from the San Francisco Art Institute in 1993 and a PhD in Art History and Criticism from Stony Brook University in 2010. Modigliani is currently Associate Professor and Program Director of Visual Studies at Tyler School of Art and Architecture at Temple University in Philadelphia.

Modigliani's work draws from multiple disciplines such as Visual Arts, Art History, Cultural Studies, and Critical Geography. Her cultural productions refuse specialization, and she is equally noted for her accomplishments in the Visual Arts (sculpture, installation, and photography), academic scholarship and critical writing.

Modigliani's artwork has been exhibited at many galleries and museums including Pennsylvania Academy of the Fine Arts Museum (Philadelphia), Vox Populi (Philadelphia), Yerba Buena Center for the Arts (San Francisco), Colby College Museum of Art (Waterville, ME), the Art Gallery of Nova Scotia (Halifax), and the Museum of Contemporary Canadian Art (Toronto). Her work is in the collections of Pennsylvania Academy of the Fine Arts and the Whitney Museum of American Art.

Her critical writing can be found in academic journals and contemporary art magazines such as Mapping Meaning, the Journal, Prefix Photo, Artnet, and C Magazine. Her book, Engendering an avant-garde; the unsettled landscapes of Vancouver photo-conceptualism, was published by Manchester University Press's Rethinking Art's Histories series in 2018.

Modigliani's most recent book, "Counter-Revanchist Art in the Global City," published in 2023, explores the intersection of art, urban spaces, and social justice. This work examines how artists respond to and challenge urban revanchism through various forms of creative action, including building walls, blockades, and barricades. The book analyzes case studies from multiple countries, offering a global perspective on the role of art in addressing spatial conflicts in the 21st century.
