= Jim Morphesis =

American artist (born 1948)

James "Jim" Morphesis
- Born: 1948 (age 77–78); Philadelphia, Pennsylvania
- Education: Tyler School of Art at Temple University, California Institute of the Arts
- Known for: Painting
- Movement: Contemporary art, Minimalism

James “Jim” Morphesis (born 1948) is an American painter born to Greek American, parents in Philadelphia, Pennsylvania. He won the Young Talent Award from the Los Angeles County Museum of Art in Los Angeles, California, in 1983.

== Biography ==
Jim Morphesis, received a Bachelor of Fine Arts degree (BFA) from the Tyler School of Art of Temple University in 1970 and earned his Master of Fine Arts (MFA) from the California Institute of the Arts in 1972. “In art school and immediately after, he made Minimalist work occasionally employing a crucifix form.” Art critic, Peter Clothier described the nature of Jim Morphesis's early paintings: ”His early work was characterized by its brooding, dramatic strength, its juxtaposition of structural formality with expressive intensity, its crusty, abstract surfaces which always seemed to reveal less than they concealed."

In 2012, Michael Duncan, independent art curator and critic wrote,“Morphesis’s breakthrough actually came at the end of the 1970s with his use of more overt religious and figurative imagery.” “Later, bodies of the 1980s work became more sculptural, with crucifix forms used as central structures of layered reliefs.”

Art historian and curator, Peter Selz, PhD stated: “Since the 1980s, Jim Morphesis has been one of the most influential members of the expressionist art movement in Los Angeles” “As strong examples of Los Angeles Neo-Expressionism, Morphesis’s works of the 1980s rank alongside those of Carlos Almaraz, David Amico, Gronk, Roger Herman, Margaret Nielson, and Joyce Trieman. Like those artists, Morphesis has used painting as a vehicle for dramatic personal statements.

== Collections (selection) ==
Morphesis has had over 42 solo exhibitions and is in numerous museum collections including:

- Los Angeles County Museum of Art, California
- San Francisco Museum of Modern Art, California
- Oakland Museum of California, California
- Metropolitan Museum of Art, New York
- Orange County Museum of Art, Newport Beach, CA
- Pérez Art Museum Miami, Florida
- Phoenix Art Museum, Colorado
- Portland Art Museum, Portland, Oregon
- Museum of Contemporary Religious Art, St. Louis, Missouri
- Museum of Contemporary Art San Diego, California
- San Antonio Museum of Art, California

== Awards ==
- City of Pasadena Arts and Culture III Grant, with Pasadena Museum of California Art
- Louis Comfort Tiffany Foundation Biennial Award for Painting and Sculpture, New York, NY, 1985
- Young Talent Award, Los Angeles County Museum of Art, (LACMA), Los Angeles, California, 1983
- California Small Images Exhibition Purchase Award, California State University, Los Angeles, California, 1971
- Nathan Margolis Memorial Award for Painting, Tyler School of Art of Temple University, Philadelphia, PA, 1970

== Personal life ==
Jim Morphesis currently resides and works in Los Angeles, California.
