= Timothy App =

American painter and educator (1947–2025)

- Born: 1947; Akron, Ohio, U.S.
- Died: November 19, 2025 (aged 78)
- Occupations: Artist, educator, curator
- Known for: Abstract painting
- Notable work: Avatar (1998), Leviathan (2001), Crucifer (2007)
- Movement: Abstract art, minimalist art

Timothy App (1947 – November 19, 2025) was an American contemporary painter, curator and educator. He taught at the Maryland Institute College of Art (MICA) from 1990 to 2019.

== Early life and education ==
Timothy App was born in Akron, Ohio, in 1947.

He attended Kent State University in Ohio, where he received a BFA degree in painting in 1970. He continued his study of painting at Tyler School of Art of Temple University and in 1974 received an MFA.

== Career ==
With many one-person and group exhibitions, he showed his abstract paintings regionally, nationally, and abroad. In 1988, his work was the focus of a 20-year survey exhibition at Linda Durham Gallery in Santa Fe. His work from the previous forty-five years was the subject of a retrospective exhibition in 2013 at American University's Katzen Arts Center in Washington, D.C., and Goya Contemporary in Baltimore.

App was a recipient of a NEA fellowship in painting, as well as an individual artist's grant from the Maryland State Arts Council.

He taught at Pomona College in California, the University of New Mexico in Albuquerque, and after 1990 at Maryland Institute College of Art (MICA). He received the Trustee's Award for Excellence in Teaching at MICA twice, and was nominated for the Richard C. Diebenkorn Teaching Fellowship. In addition to teaching and painting, he wrote on the work of other artists, lectured on his own work, and curated exhibitions of abstract painting.

His artwork is in museum collections, including the Albuquerque Museum, Buffalo AKG Art Museum, and the Baltimore Museum of Art.

== Death ==
App died on November 19, 2025, at the age of 78.

== Exhibitions ==
=== Solo exhibitions ===
- 1988, Timothy App: A Survey of Paintings, 1968–1988, Linda Durham Gallery, Santa Fe, New Mexico, U.S.
- 2013, The Aesthetics of Precision, American University Museum, Katzen Arts Center, Washington, D.C., U.S.
- 2013, The Aesthetics of Precision, Goya Contemporary, Baltimore, Maryland, U.S.
- 2021, States of Mind, Goya Contemporary, Baltimore, Maryland, U.S.
- 2024, Timothy App: Equipoise, Goya Contemporary, Baltimore, Maryland, U.S.

=== Group exhibitions ===
- 2009, The Grey Zone: Abstraction and/or Representation Paintings and Drawings by Timothy App and Howie Lee Weiss, Howard Community College, Columbia, Maryland, U.S.

== See also ==
- Abstract painting
