= Marlo Pascual =

American artist

- Born: June 1, 1972; Nashville, Tennessee, U.S.
- Died: April 3, 2020 (aged 47); Philadelphia, Pennsylvania, U.S.

Marlo Pascual (June 1, 1972 – April 3, 2020) was an American artist.

Pascual was born in 1972 in Nashville, Tennessee. She studied at the University of Tennessee and later received a Master of Fine Arts from the Tyler School of Art. Her first solo show was at the Swiss Institute Contemporary Art New York in 2009, with her first solo museum exhibition occurring the following year at Aspen Art Museum, where she was an artist-in-residence.

Pascual died of cancer on April 3, 2020 at the age of 47. Her work is in the Aspen Art Museum, the Museum of Contemporary Art Chicago, the Walker Art Center, the Pérez Art Museum Miami, and the Whitney Museum of American Art.

In 2026 the National Museum of Women in the Arts held a solo exhibition of her work entitled Marlo Pascual: Making Something Out of Something.
