= Adela Akers =

American textile artist (1933–2023)

- Born: February 7, 1933; Santiago de Compostela, Spain
- Died: August 9, 2023 (aged 90); Guerneville, California, U.S.
- Known for: Textile art
- Spouse: Cary Krueger

Adela Akers (February 7, 1933 – August 9, 2023) was a Spanish-born textile and fiber artist residing in the United States. She was Professor Emeritus (1972 to 1995) at the Tyler School of Art. Her career as an artist spans the "whole history of modern fiber art." Her work is in the Renwick Gallery, the Metropolitan Museum of Art and the Museum of Art and Design. Her papers (dating from 1960 to 2009) are at the Archives of American Art.

== Early life and education ==
Akers was born on February 7, 1933, in Santiago de Compostela, Spain. She was raised in Cuba, her mother was a trained seamstress, and later she and her husband had a small import business in Havana, Cuba. Akers' exposure to business practices through her family helped her later in life to run her own small art business. She has one brother who later became an accountant in Chicago.

Akers graduated from the University of Havana with a degree in Pharmacy. She had wanted to have a practical job, especially because her parents had helped her get through school. However, later, Akers found she was bored with pharmacy work. In Havana, she met a group of artists who called themselves Los Once (The Eleven) who encouraged her to make art. Akers started taking art classes because of the suggestion of Los Once and she went to study in Chicago in 1957.

She studied at the Art Institute of Chicago, even though at first her English wasn't as strong as she wished. At the Institute she was introduced to weaving. Later she studied at Cranbrook Academy of Art where she finished in 1963. She was a weaver-in-residence at Penland School of Crafts.

== Traditional weavers ==
In 1965, she was asked by the Alliance for Progress to perform a survey of weaving in rural Peru to ascertain the market potential of weavers there. She lived in a small town, Chota, in northern Peru for four months, studying the traditional weavers and .

In 1967 she was asked by a photographic firm to find weavers in Yucatan, Mexico, who could produce a large number of place mats. Akers worked with the weavers to produce a product that was uniform in shape, size, and color.

== Artwork and career ==
Her weavings consist of zigzags, checkerboard patterns, and simple geometric shapes. Akers’s work has been influenced and informed by pre-Columbian textiles and paintings by women of the Mbuti (Ituri Forest in the Democratic Republic of the Congo). Pre-Columbian work appealed to Akers because she saw math and geometry in it. Akers was also very attached to using a loom for the same reasons, because the loom is very mathematical.

Journeying from one point to another has been a physical and transformative reality in her life, increasing her self-confidence and expanding her vision of the world. These geographical voyages have enabled her to experience the broad horizons and quiet strength of country living, the power of nature, and the palpitating rhythm of cities. While travel has enlarged her perspective, her work expresses the sense of journey itself, rather than alluding to a specific site or sense of place.

Akers worked in series, with each piece informing the next.

Akers taught weaving and fiber arts at Penland School of Crafts in the summers of 1968-70. At Temple University she was head of the fiber department at the Tyler School of Art beginning in 1972. She also taught at San Francisco State University in 1981.

Her art is in the permanent collection of the De Young Museum of San Francisco.

== Awards and honors ==
She received National Endowment for the Arts crafsman's fellowships in 1974 and 1980, a New Jersey Council on the Arts grant in 1971, and a Pennsylvania Council on the Arts grant in 1983.

== Personal life ==
Akers met her husband, Frank R. Akers, while the two were studying at the Chicago Art Institute.

Akers died on August 9, 2023.

== Exhibitions ==
- 2014 "August Artist-in-Residence: Adela Akers: Traced Memories" Fine Art Museum of San Francisco
- 2004, 2006, 2008, 2010, 2012, 2014 Fiber Biennials at Snyderman-Works Galleries, Philadelphia PA
- 2010 Sonoma County Museum
- 2010 "The 49th Anniversary Show" Triangle Gallery
- 2008 "Ashes to Art", The Gallery at FUNERIA
- 1991 Philadelphia Museum of Art
- 1986 Pennsylvania Academy of the Fine Arts
- 1982 Rhode Island School of Design
- 1982 Cooper–Hewitt, National Design Museum
