= Manon Cleary =

American painter

Manon Catherine Cleary
- Manon Cleary, 1982 by Paul Feinberg
- Born: November 14, 1942; St. Louis, Missouri
- Died: November 26, 2011 (aged 69); Washington, D.C.
- Education: Washington University in St. Louis, Temple University
- Known for: Figurative painting, Photorealism
- Spouse: F. Steven Kijek

Manon Cleary (November 14, 1942 – November 26, 2011) was an American artist based in Washington, D.C. Cleary specialized in photo-realistic paintings and drawings. Many of her works were inspired by events in her life and focused on the human form and lights.

Cleary received her bachelor's degree from Washington University in her hometown of St. Louis, Missouri. She later received her master's degree from the Tyler School of Art at Temple University in Philadelphia. In 1970, shortly after graduation, Cleary moved to Washington, D.C. where she worked at the University of the District of Columbia as a professor for thirty years.

Cleary's style of art is realistic; it is said that she would often win awards for her work in the photography category by mistake. She often worked in a reductive fashion by using graphite powder, tissues, and erasers. This style allowed her to create works that were softer and more personal, but still realistic.

Cleary died in 2011 at the age of 69. She suffered for many years from chronic obstructive pulmonary disease. Her work is held by many museums throughout the United States, including the Art Institute of Chicago, the National Museum of Women in the Arts, the Brooklyn Museum, the Smithsonian American Art Museum and the National Gallery of Art. She held numerous solo exhibitions and was a part of many exhibitions worldwide.

== Early life and education ==
Cleary was born on November 14, 1942, in St. Louis, Missouri with her identical twin sister, Shirley Cleary-Cooper. Cleary and her twin were very similar growing up, and Cleary stated in an interview that they were dressed alike by their mother until adulthood. Her father was a general practitioner in St. Louis and brought home almost every disease and epidemic that hit the city. Cleary and her sister were at home, sick for much of their childhood. It was during this time at home that they both turned to art. They continued their artistic careers by associating with the art museum and majoring in art in high school.

Cleary went to Washington University in St. Louis and received her degree in 1964. After graduating, Cleary applied to spend her first year of graduate school in Rome, for the Tyler School of Art. While in Rome, Cleary studied the work of Caravaggio and remained inspired by his work for much of her career. After a year in Rome, Cleary finished her graduate studies and received her MFA in 1968, at Temple University in Philadelphia, Pennsylvania. Cleary moved to upstate New York, where she briefly taught at a state university in Oswego. Shortly thereafter, she moved to Washington, D.C. in 1970, where she would remain for the rest of her life.

== Work ==
Cleary used many different mediums throughout her career but is most well known for her erotic figures in paintings and her drawings.

=== Style ===
Cleary is known for her photo-realism; The Washington Post called her the best figure painter of her generation. Cleary's style developed during her undergraduate days. Her watercolour professor taught her how to mix graphite powder and alcohol to create a more painterly style of drawing, but she didn't like it, claiming the graphite tended to "chalk up." When she went back to drawing a few years later, it was leftover graphite from that period she turned to, not charcoal. Cleary was drawn to the glow that only graphite can provide. This time though, Cleary developed her own style. She worked in a reductive, layered fashion, covering the whole paper in graphite and then using erasers to flesh out the image. This allowed the subject to come into focus slowly, as the graphite was layered with the aid of tissues and blending stumps. Cleary created her images from multiple photos, taken from different angles, a habit she developed during college when models weren't readily available. This is partly why she is identified as a photorealist.

This process was challenging for Cleary, as there was no precedent or guide to help her with her style. There was much trial and error to figure out not only what erasers worked best, but also how much stress the paper could take. Cleary developed this style out of fear of white paper; she also found it easier to cover a mistake by working this way, as it was easier to add more graphite instead of erasing a line. By working in this reductive fashion, Cleary created an image that was original and unique. Her drawings had a soft and ethereal quality without the harsh pencil lines. While her work is considered photorealism, it stands out from other artists of the time. Cleary's mastery of drawing flowed over into other mediums, such as pastels.

Cleary was also known as a painter, being drawn to the wide range of colors that were available in painting compared to the rather limited number of colors available in pastels. Her painting style has been described as "not painterly", as tries to hide her brush strokes and remove any evidence of her technique.

=== Themes and subjects ===
Cleary was best known for her nude figure drawings, her most common subject being herself. She was considered by many to be perhaps the best figure painter not only in Washington D.C. but in the country, painting idealized images of her subjects and herself. In her mid-thirties she acknowledged she had not accepted her aging and was removing blemishes from her paintings, claiming she doesn't "paint the grotesque", but the ideal.

If nudes were Cleary's most common subject, her most beloved subject would be rats. Cleary was given a rat as a gift in the 1970s, and from that point on, they became a recurring subject for her (she would also keep rats as pets for the rest of her life). The rats were often drawn in pastels, and Cleary had truly mastered their likeness. In one memorable piece Untitled, Cleary painted two life-size rats (green and soft pink) serving her as she reclined nude on a divan while smoking.

Another theme that is very apparent in Cleary's work is sexuality. Some of her art is frank and bold, like her series of large oil paintings from the early 1990s that studied male genitalia. (In 1997, one of her paintings at an erotic art auction was featured on an episode of HBO's Real Sex.) Other studies of sexuality are more subtle and abstract. Cleary painted many flowers that were said to be in the vein of Georgia O'Keeffe. Her open exploration of sexuality creates a distraction for the viewer. The more flagrant the sexuality, the more Cleary conceals herself in her work.

== Teaching career and life in Washington D.C. ==
Cleary taught at the University of the District of Columbia for 30 years, beloved by her students and by many of the local artists in Washington, D.C. She was a collector of local art, a supporter of local artists and a longtime member of the Arts Club of Washington. After a couple of years in Washington, D.C., she moved into Beverly Court Apartments—now Beverly Court Cooperative. It was the epicenter of art in the 1970s for Washington, D.C. and Cleary was the star. Beverly Court housed artists such as Allan Bridge, Yuri Schwebler, Jonathan Meader, and Angelo Hodick. Cleary would host dinner parties for the building, and a communal living arrangement of sorts took place. The doors to apartments were often open, and artists collaborated on art together. Beverly Court was bought by its residents in 1979 after most of the artists had left, and it became the first cooperative in Washington, D.C.

== Personal life ==
In 1981, Cleary was briefly married to a man named Tommy Iven Hansen, who was a young art student from Denmark. They were divorced about a year later.

In 1996, Cleary experienced a traumatic event while visiting Kazakhstan that year to lecture about art. She was sexually assaulted by a Kazakh artist and she left the country quickly in a state of denial. It took Cleary several months to start to examine her feelings and ended up creating an evocative series titled, "The Rape Series" after the event. The series features paintings of Cleary's face, shaped in horror and pain, with red paint splattered over the canvas. The paintings are the most nonconventional of Cleary's portfolio, with some of the canvases burned or slashed. Cleary's attacker was invited to Washington, D.C. for a show on Kazakhstan art in 1998, but was luckily denied entry into the United States. The news was hard to take for Cleary, but she believes because of an affidavit she signed with the State Department upon returning from Kazakhstan, he was turned away.

Cleary met her second husband, F. Steven Kijek, a dancer, in Baltimore at a party after a gallery opening. When they met, he supposedly stripped naked in the middle of a crowd and asked if she would like to paint him. They were married in 2001. Cleary was diagnosed with chronic obstructive pulmonary disease in 1999 and was experiencing pulmonary failure. This was brought on by a smoking habit and inhaling toxic fumes from her paint. Her doctor gave her just two years to live in 2001. The disease forced Cleary to retire, and her weight dropped to just 80 pounds. She would need to use an oxygen tank and breathing tube for the remainder of her life. Even with all of these challenges, Cleary still found a way to create new art; she created a series titled "Breathless" that featured her face, with breathing tubes, pressed up against the glass of a copy machine. Cleary died in 2011 in her apartment at Beverly Court, where she had lived for 40 years.

== Solo exhibitions ==
- 2014-Arts Club of Washington - Manon Cleary, Obsessive Observer: A New Perspective Through Her Photographic Studies
- 2009-Addison/Ripley Gallery, DC
- 2007-DC Arts Center
- 2006-Emerson Gallery, DC
- 2006-Washington Art Museum
- 2005-Waddle Gallery, Louden Campus, Sterling, Virginia
- 2002-Pass Gallery, DC
- 1997-"Manon Cleary, Body in the Question," Maryland Art Place
- 1985-"Pintura e Desenho De Manon Cleary," Centro de Arte de Arte Moderna, Gulbekian Found, Lisbon, Portugal
- 1974-Pyramid Galleries, Ltd., DC
- 1972-Franz Bader Gallery, DC
- 1968-Tyler Gallery, Philadelphia
