= Marsha Cottrell =

American artist

- Born: 19 February 1964; Philadelphia, PA
- Education: Tyler School of Art–BFA;The University of North Carolina at Chapel Hill–MFA
- Known for: Works on paper, drawing, drawing, prints
- Website: http://www.marshacottrell.com/

Marsha Cottrell (born 1964) is an American artist.

== Biography ==
Cottrell was born in Philadelphia, Pennsylvania, in 1964. She now lives and works in Brooklyn, NY. Cottrell was educated at Tyler School of Art, Temple University where she received a Bachelor of Fine Arts, and The University of North Carolina at Chapel Hill where she received a Masters of Fine Arts.

Cottrell was trained as a painter, but while working in the production department of a magazine in the late 1990s she began to utilize a prosaic office printer and began layering periods, commas, brackets, and other forms to create compositions. Through a process of running paper through printer again and again, these cropped, resized and distorted shapes developed into unique works on paper. Cottrell described the change from painting to her new art-making method in the following terms: "Since I couldn't be in my studio, it was natural for me to consider how I might use the tools in my immediate environment." When a work on paper is completed Cottrell deletes the corresponding digital file, emphasizing the physicality of the object and placing her practice in opposition to cyberart and similar movements.

Cottrell often uses high quality mulberry paper in her works – allowing the iron oxide toner to build up on the surface over the course of multiple runs through a printer. The artist, who typically works in grayscale, debuted her first works in color at a 2021 exhibition with her New York gallery, Van Doren Waxter.

== Awards ==
In 2019, Cottrell received an Anonymous Was A Woman award, and is also a recipient of the 2013 Louis Comfort Tiffany Foundation, Biennial Award; the 2007 Pollock-Krasner Foundation, Fellowship Grant in Drawing; the 2004 Harvestworks Digital Media Arts Center, Educational Grant; the 2003 New York Foundation for the Arts, Fellowship Grant in Drawing; the 2001 John Simon Guggenheim Memorial Foundation, Fellowship; the 1999 New York Foundation for the Arts, Fellowship Grant in Digital Arts; and the 1999 Marie Walsh Sharpe Art Foundation, Space Program.

== Selected solo exhibitions ==
Year	Exhibitions
1998	Derek Eller Gallery, New York, NY
2000	Punctuation Drawings, Revolution Gallery, Detroit, MI
2003	g-module, Paris, France
2012	Petra Rinck Galerie, Düsseldorf, Germany
2015	Eleven Rivington, New York, NY
2016	Anthony Meier Fine Arts, San Francisco, CA
2017	Petra Rinck Galerie, Düsseldorf, Germany
2018	Screen Life, Van Doren Waxter, New York, NY
2019	Marsha Cottrell: Black and Light, Contemporary Art Museum of Raleigh, Raleigh, NC
2021	Van Doren Waxter, New York, NY

== Selected public collections ==
Marsha Cottrell's work is featured in the collections of the Art Institute of Chicago, Chicago, IL; the Blanton Museum of Art, The University of Texas at Austin, Austin, TX; Morgan Library and Museum, New York, NY; Museum Kunstpalast, Düsseldorf, Germany; Museum of Modern Art, New York, NY; National Gallery of Art, Washington, DC; North Carolina Museum of Art, NC; Philadelphia Museum of Art, Philadelphia, Pennsylvania; San Francisco Museum of Modern Art, San Francisco, CA
