= Sondra Sherman =

American painter and jewelry maker (born 1958)

- Born: 1958 (age 67–68); Philadelphia, Pennsylvania, U.S.
- Education: Temple University (BFA); Academy of Fine Arts, Munich (Diplom)
- Known for: Jewelry designer

Sondra Sherman (born 1958) is an American painter and jewelry maker. Sherman's work has been praised for its "deeply personal" expression of human emotion and of the subjects inspired by them. Sherman's skills and reputation as a jeweler have earned her many awards, including a Tiffany Foundation Emerging Artists Award, various fellowships, and a Fulbright Scholarship.

== Early life and education ==
Sherman was born in 1958 in Philadelphia, Pennsylvania. She majored in painting and jewelry at the Tyler School of Art in Philadelphia before moving to Germany in 1984.

In 1980, Sherman received a Bachelor of Fine Arts from the Tyler School of Art and Architecture at Temple University, where she concentrated in jewelry and painting. In 1990, she received her Diplom (a Master of Fine Arts equivalent) from the Academy of Fine Arts, Munich in Germany.

== Career ==
Since 2006, Sherman has worked at San Diego State University as the jewelry and metalwork program head and a professor of art. She has also taught at Rhode Island School of Design, Savannah College of Art and Design, State University of New York at New Paltz, and Rhode Island College.

== Selected Series and Artwork ==
=== The Box Pieces ===
Sherman's series The Box Pieces reflects on archetypes and the dynamic which exist within relationships. This series primarily consists of jewelry objects which often reference archetypal literary and mythical characters including Miss Havisham, Venus, and Cupid. Sherman complicates these figures by incorporating themes such as sensuality, sexuality, and decay into their representations.

Each piece in this series is contained by a box made to serve as its complement, the feature for which the series is named. of these boxes, American Author Ralph Turner writes, "a narrative documenting the finding of the components of her jewelry is hinted at, or reproduced, on its container. This narrative permeates her graceful, 'classical' interpretations, which transform fragments from old chandeliers, photographs and crushed glass, reinventing them into votive and ambiguous ornament."

=== Anthophobia: Fear Of Flowers ===
This series, first exhibited at Gallery Sienna Patti in 2007, reflects on the increasing medicalization of American society by presenting plants typically used in pharmaceuticals in steel brooches that make visual reference to corsages. Describing her own work, Sherman writes, "I hate pharmaceutical commercials. They make me nervous and then sell me something to ease my nerves. I like the idea of a medicinal corsage, and, jewelry that soothes."

=== Upside Down in Paradise ===
Upside Down in Paradise explores the cultural and geographic landscape of Southern California. Within this series, Sherman photographs the landscape as seen from inside of trains and cars, largely focusing on ordinary or mundane buildings, and then presents the images captured in jewelry objects. of this series, Sherman writes, "While ‘Upside Down in Paradise’ has a particular geographical reference, its subject is inherently universal- in the diversity of ethnicities and social histories which make up the culture of California, but also in the common experiences of (re)locating oneself in an unfamiliar place, or the perceptions developed while traveling through... The vestigial glamour of the California idyll of the 1950’s and 60’s, palpable in the faded commercial signs, and architectural facades which punctuate the roadside with their gemstone-like shapes, and generous proportions, against the expansive blue sky inspire oversize jewelry with sun weathered surfaces."

=== The Gemstone Apothecary ===
Hybrids of science, superstition, and jewelry signifiers, The Gemstone Apothecary explores the complex intersections of rationality, belief, and emotional resonance. Sherman writes, "[The Gemstone Apothecary} reinterprets healing stones as symbols for the psychosocial contexts of jewelry—concepts that have consistently driven my practice. The Gemstone Apothecary emerged as a reflection on the enduring interplay between rational science and emotional belief, using jewelry as a lens to explore humanity’s need for meaning, comfort, and control."

== Collections ==
Sherman's work is in the permanent collections of:

- the Philadelphia Museum of Art
- the Boston Museum of Fine Arts
- the Metropolitan Museum of Art
- the Museum of Arts and Design
- the Los Angeles County Museum of Art
- the Racine Art Museum
- the Renwick Gallery-National Museum of American Art of the Smithsonian Institution
- the Rhode Island School of Design Museum
- the City Museum of Turnov, Czech Republic.
