= Odili Donald Odita =

Nigerian American abstract painter (born 1966)

- Born: 1966 (age 59–60); Enugu, Nigeria
- Known for: Painting

External videos
- Commissions Celebrating a Decade, Duke University (Scroll down for videos),
- Artist Talks for Young Audiences: Odili Donald Odita, ICA Miami

Odili Donald Odita // (born 18 February 1966) is a Nigerian American abstract painter who lives and works in Philadelphia, Pennsylvania. His work explores color both in the figurative historical context and in the sociopolitical sense. His vibrant large-scale abstractions have been described as "showstoppers" and are considered to raise questions about race and society. He uses the colors to create a conversation surrounding the separation of self and image. Most of Odita's work is inspired by the vibrant textiles of his home country, Nigeria, mixed with patterns from Western modernity.

== Early life and education ==
Odita was born on 18 February 1966, in Enugu, Nigeria. In 1967, his family were forced to flee Nigeria in order to avoid the Biafran war. They then resided in Columbus, Ohio in the United States.

Starting at the age of five, Odita began recreating drawings from superhero comic books, and later fashion magazines. He said, "I knew I was going to be an artist after I did a marathon copying of images from a stack of prints/drawings that my father had collected for his work as an art historian." Day and night, Odita drew until fatigue forced him to fall asleep.

Odita received his BFA, with Distinction, from Ohio State University in 1988, where he also received the Excellence in the Arts Award. He received a MFA from Bennington College, Vermont in 1990.

In 1998 Odita earned an ART/OMI, International Artist Residency.

== Career ==
In the 1990s Odita was a critic for Flash Art International, and a consulting editor and writer for NKA, Journal of Contemporary African Art. Odita first won the Penny McCall Foundation Grant in 1994. From 2003 to 2005 he was a Visiting Critic in Painting at Yale University School of Art. From 2002 to 2003 he was a Visiting associate professor in painting at the University of South Florida, Tampa. From 2000 to 2006 he was an associate professor in painting at the Florida State University, Tallahassee. From 2006 to the present Odita has been an associate professor of painting in Philadelphia at the Tyler School of Art / Temple University.

Odita is primarily a painter, and also works in photo-based pieces and installation art. He has experimented with a variety of media, but his works since the 1990s are often large-scale paintings on canvas and Plexiglass. He sometimes paints directly on walls to alter the perception of space. Often involving "complex interlocking geometries and contrasting hues", his works are seen as raising significant questions about race and society.

All visual materials are culturally grounded and that it is important to recognize where their meaning is derived from.

Although often related to mainstream abstract artists such as Helen Frankenthaler and Kenneth Noland, Odita intentionally places himself in a tradition of black abstract painters from the 1970s and 1980s. He has studied and interviewed many of the artists from that period including Howardena Pindell, Alvin D. Loving, Edward Clark, Frank Bowling, and Stanley Whitney.

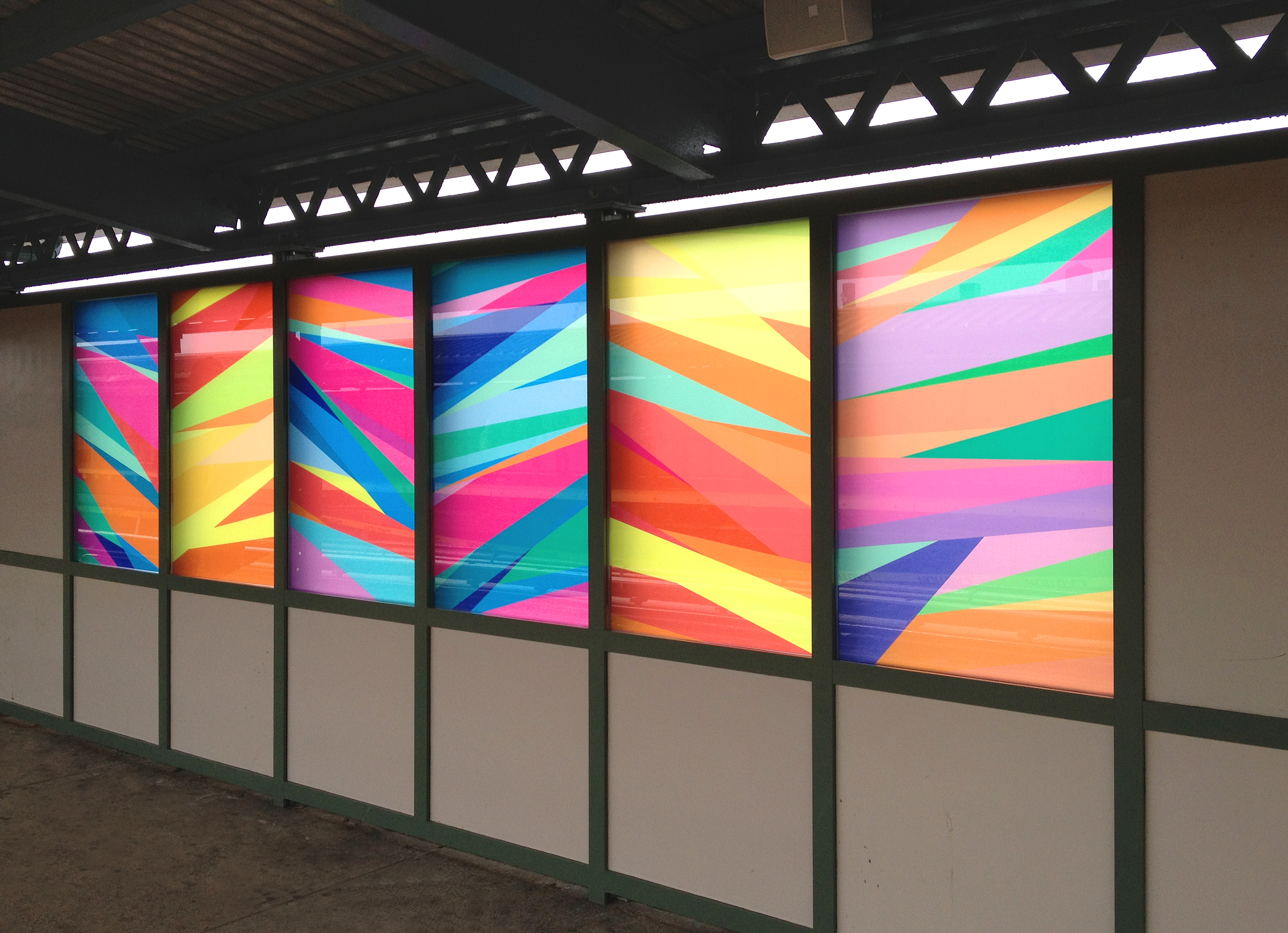

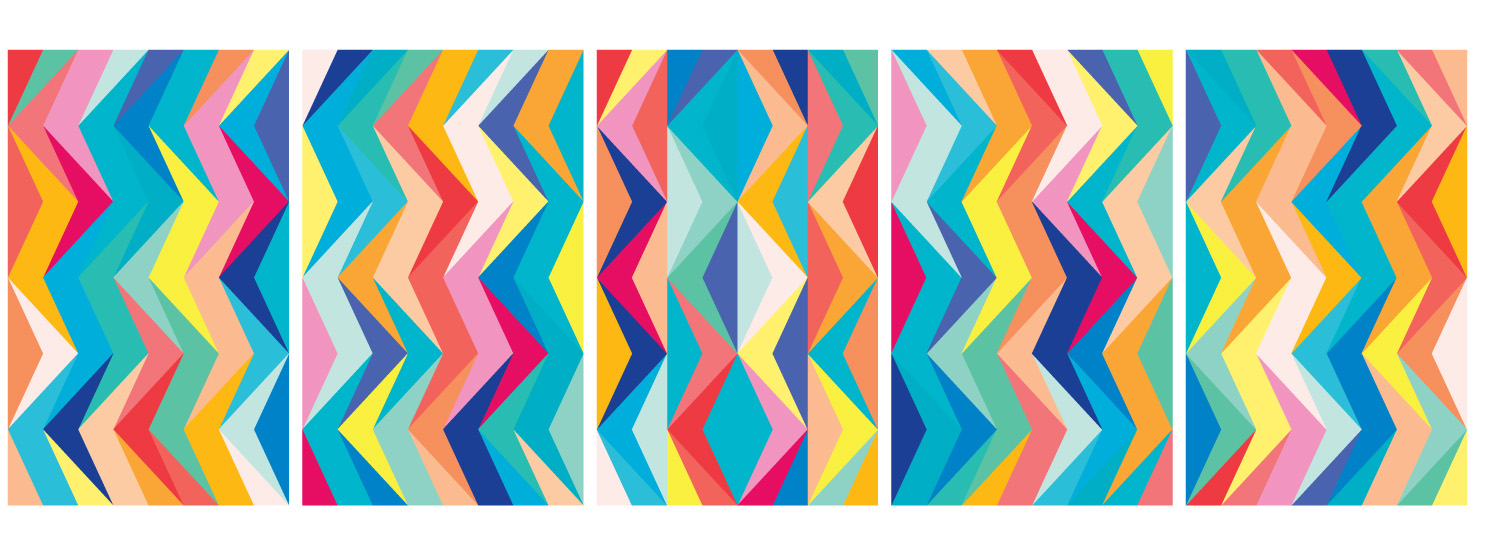

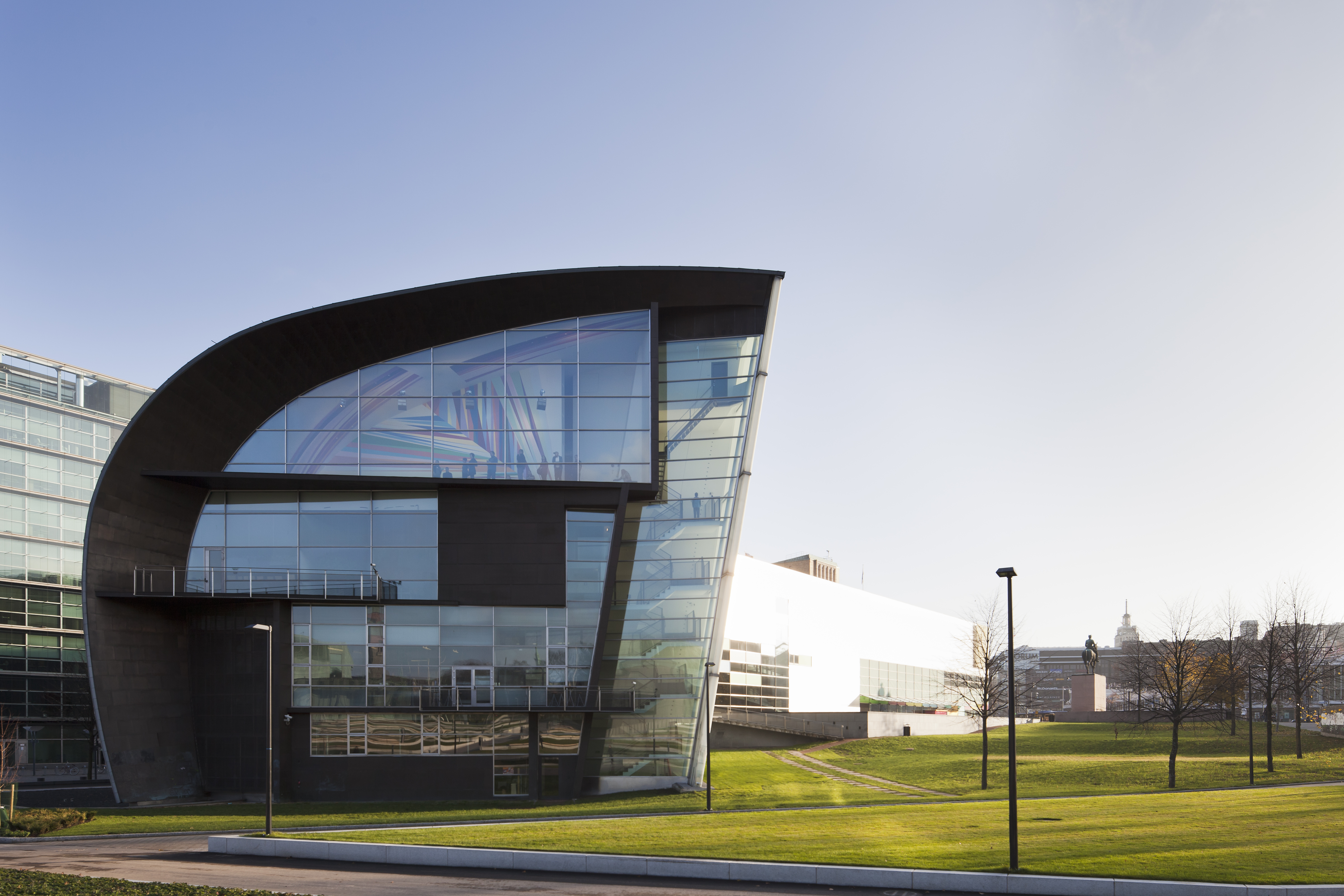

== Awards ==
- 1994: Penny McCall Foundation Grant
- 2001: Joan Mitchell Foundation Grant
- 2007: Louis Comfort Tiffany Grant
- 2007: his large installation Give Me Shelter was featured prominently in the 52nd Venice Biennale exhibition Think With The Senses, Feel With the Mind, curated by Robert Storr.
- 2022: Pew Center Fellowship
