= Harriete Estel Berman =

American artist

- Born: 1952 (age 73–74); Harrisburg, PA
- Website: harrieteestelberman.com

Harriete Estel Berman (born 1952) is an American artist known for her sculptures and jewelry made from post-consumer, recycled household goods, and her satirical explorations of women's roles in society.

== Early life and education ==
Berman was born in Harrisburg, Pennsylvania. She attended Syracuse University, and was granted a BFA in 1974. In 1980, she earned an MFA from Tyler School of Art, Temple University.

In 1990, she was the Artist in Residence at the Cranbrook Academy of Art. She has also been a lecturer and teacher at California College of Arts & Crafts and Vermont College of Norwich University.

She currently lives and works in San Mateo, California.

== Artistic career ==
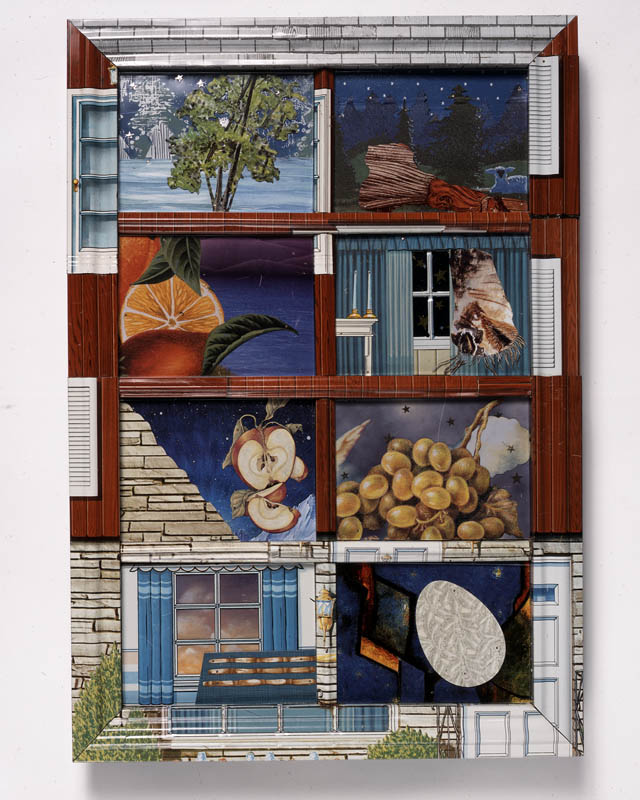
For the Child Who is Unable to Inquire, Thou Shalt Explain the Whole Story of Passover (Seder plate) by Harriete Estel Berman

Selected solo exhibitions: Peninsula Museum of Art, Arabella Decker Gallery. Burlingame, CA (2018); Kimura Gallery, “Consuming Conversation”, University of Alaska, Anchorage, AK (2012); Anita Seipp Gallery, “Pick Up Your Pencils, Begin”, Palo Alto, CA (2011); Anita Seipp Gallery, “Consuming Conversations”, Palo Alto, CA (2005); National Ornamental Metal Museum, “Mastersmith 2004”, Memphis, TN (2004); Sybaris Gallery, Royal Oak, MI (2002); Sybaris Gallery, Royal Oak, MI (1999).

Exhibitions for grass \’gras\ 9’x9’ lawn of 32,400 blades of grass. Documentary video available for exhibition:.Manuf®actured, CA College of the Arts, Oliver Art Center, Oakland, CA (2011); “Integral Elements”, Loveland Museum, Loveland, CO (2010); SMART Art Competition - Trash into Treasure”, Lincart Gallery, San Francisco, CA (2009); “Domesticity”, Fort Collins Museum of Contemporary Art, Fort Collins, CO (2005); “City Life”, Euphrat Gallery, DeAnza College, Cupertino, CA (2004);“Return Engagement”, Copia, Napa, CA (2002); “Contemporary Metalsmiths” Oklahoma State, Stillwater, OK (2001); Southwest Center for Arts and Crafts, San Antonio, TX (2001-00) 2000 grass \’gras\ Wustum Museum, Racine, WI (2000)

Solo exhibitions for "The Family of Appliances You Can Believe In," at COPIA, Napa, CA (2005); Barbican Centre, London, England (1998); Kohler Arts Center, Sheboygan, WI (1986); Triton Museum of Art, Santa Clara, CA (1983); ARCO Center for Visual Art, Los Angeles, CA (1983-82); California Crafts Museum, Palo Alto, CA (1982) and Sybaris Gallery (1999),

Major work includes commentary on the prevalence of standardized testing of students, including Pick Up Your Pencils, Begin, a 12 x 28 foot curtain of pencils arranged in the form of a bell curve.

Since 2001 Harriete Estel Berman has worked to provide information for artists and makers about professional practices. These efforts include the Professional Guidelines, ASK Harriete and the SNAG Professional Development Seminar.

Website for Harriete Estel Berman: https://harrieteestelberman.com/

== Collections ==
She has works in the permanent collections of the Detroit Institute of Arts, the Smithsonian American Art Museum, the Tyler School of Art, and The Jewish Museum, New York, Philadelphia Museum of Art, Minneapolis Institute of Arts, Crocker Art Museum, Museum of Arts and Design, Columbus Museum of Art, Jewish Museum, Berlin, Germany, Museum of Fine Arts, Boston, National Ornamental Metal Museum, Oakland Museum of California, Racine Art Museum, Yeshiva University Museum, and The Congregation Emanu-el.
