= Anne Buckwalter =

American painter

- Born: 1987 (age 38–39); Lancaster, Pennsylvania, US
- Education: Maine College of Art & Design; Tyler School of Art
- Known for: Painting
- Awards: Pollock-Krasner Foundation; Joan Mitchell Foundation; Harpo Foundation
- Website: Anne Buckwalter

Anne Buckwalter, Fourth of July, gouache on panel, 30" × 40", 2025.

Anne Buckwalter (born 1987) is an American artist. She paints complex, deceptively quaint interiors that juxtapose everyday, orderly domesticity with ambiguous, subversive elements, typically of an erotic nature. Described as meticulously rendered and rich in pattern and details, her compartmentalized, dollhouse-like compositions in gouache suggest obscure narratives exploring female identity and desire. Hannah Silver of Wallpaper remarked, "For Buckwalter, an environment littered with the routines of its inhabitants is rich in intimate code. In her paintings, nothing is quite as it seems. Flattened perspectives skew traditional proportions, intertwining a fantastical element throughout considerations of queerness and sexuality in a happy marriage of mundanity and lust."

Buckwalter has been awarded grants from the Pollock-Krasner Foundation, Joan Mitchell Foundation, Harpo Foundation and the Idea Fund, and an artist residency at Mass MoCA. She is based in rural Durham, Maine.

== Life and career ==
Buckwalter was born in Lancaster, Pennsylvania in 1987. She studied art at the Tyler School of Art (BFA, 2010) and the Maine College of Art & Design (MFA, 2012). She was raised in rural, Pennsylvania Dutch and conservative Methodist traditions, influences that she often seeks to reconcile in her work.

Buckwalter has had solo exhibitions at the Farnsworth Art Museum and galleries including Uffner & Liu (New York), Rebecca Camacho Presents (San Francisco), Pentimenti (Philadelphia), SOCO Gallery (Charlotte) and Massimodecarlo Pièce Unique (Paris). She exhibited in group shows at the Center for Maine Contemporary Art, Portland Museum of Art and Woodmere Art Museum, among others. She received artist residencies from organizations including the Banff Centre for Arts and Creativity, Ellis-Beauregard Foundation, Galveston Artist Residency, Mass MoCA and Vermont Studio Center. Her work belongs to the collections of the Farnsworth Art Museum, Institute of Contemporary Art Miami, Pennsylvania Academy of the Fine Arts, Art Museum of West Virginia University, X Museum (China), and Zuzeum (Latvia).

In 2024, Buckwalter came out with a book of poetry, titled Laundry Rooms.

== Work and critical reception ==
Buckwalter's paintings have been characterized as "faux-naïve, exquisitely precise, carefully appointed interiors" by New York Times critic Roberta Smith. She populates her compositions with a surfeit of details—objects and knick-knacks, adorned textiles, nature motifs and patterns that reference historical and contemporary stylings such as folk and craft art, Rococo, and the flat, decorative traditions of her Pennsylvania Dutch heritage. Nonchalantly interwoven into them, are erotic elements: tangled limbs and glimpses of naked bodies partially framed in windows, doorways or mirrors (largely female figures, suggestively paired or alone), strewn underwear, garter belts, sex toys, braided whips and pornography (e.g., Fourth of July, 2025). Often, the viewer is positioned as a voyeur, privy to intimate, yet commonplace scenarios.

Critics suggest that for Buckwalter Interior spaces are synonymous with psychological spaces—places embodying ambivalent, sometimes incompatible feelings, values and desires: the erotic and everyday, the hygienic and unruly, and kinky and wholesome. Her cross-sectional images are said to literally dissect traditional representations of the relationship between domesticity and femininity, while also highlighting and normalizing considerations of sexual expression, the body and queerness. Rae Alexandra observed, "The culture clash inherent in her work is a highly effective challenge to how America so often views queer spaces—urban, underground, somehow deviant."
