= Stone Roberts =

American painter

- Born: 1951 (age 74–75); Asheville, North Carolina, United States
- Education: Tyler School of Art, Yale University
- Known for: Painting, drawing
- Style: Figurative, representational
- Partner: Betsey (née Milligan) Roberts
- Website: Stone Roberts

Stone Roberts, Interior Light, Oil on linen, 72" x 96", 2002.

Stone Roberts (born 1951) is an American representational artist known for figurative works, street scenes and still lifes. His art has been compared to European Old Masters and neoclassicists from Vermeer and Caravaggio to Jacques-Louis David and Ingres for its mastery of materials, precision of form and composition, complex play of light and detail, and heightened sense of texture and color. Nonetheless, critics also identify an equally strong contemporary strain in his inclination toward enigmatic or incongruous elements and formal choices, which raise unresolved questions involving action, time, memory and history in his paintings. American Artist critic Michael Burlingham wrote that rather than replicate things as they are, for Roberts "realism is a language for conjuring images of subtle imagination, works that speak to the deepest levels of experience".

Roberts has appeared in surveys at the Metropolitan Museum of Art, Drents Museum (Netherlands), Orlando Museum of Art and Delaware Art Museum, and had solo exhibitions at the Museum of the City of New York and New Britain Museum of American Art (2015), among other venues. His work belongs to the public collections of the Metropolitan Museum, de Young Museum and Asheville Art Museum, among others. After being based in Manhattan for most of his career, Roberts lives and works in Connecticut.

== Early life and career ==
J. Stone Roberts was born in 1951 and raised in Asheville, North Carolina, the son of Camille Stone Roberts and Dr. Pearce Roberts Jr.; his maternal grandfather was the college athlete and coach, Stein Stone. In 1969, Roberts entered Yale University intending a career in law or business, but after taking a printmaking course his sophomore year, changed his focus to art. He studied drawing under the realist painter William H. Bailey, eventually turning his interest to painting and earning a BA degree in 1973. He married Elizabeth (Betsey) Barksdale Milligan in 1974 and continued his studies at the Tyler School of Art in Philadelphia and Rome, working respectively with the painters John Moore and Ronald Markman and earning an MFA in 1975.

Roberts's inclinations toward old-master aesthetics and beauty ran contrary to the dominance of conceptualism and minimalism in contemporary art of the time. He moved to New York City in 1975 and worked in banking while painting in his free-time until 1981, when he decided to devote himself fully to art at his wife's urging. He refined his approach for a year while the couple lived at her family home in the Mississippi Delta before beginning his first large-scale work.

After returning to New York, Roberts began exhibiting at Robert Schoelkopf Gallery, including his first solo show of figurative and still-life work in 1986. After a second show there in 1989, he exhibited at the Salander-O'Reilly (1993–2004), Leigh Morse Fine Art (2009) and Hirschl & Adler Modern (2014) galleries in New York, as well as at the Asheville Art Museum (2007), Museum of the City of New York (2012) and New Britain Museum (2015).

== Work and reception ==
In addition to European masters, influences on Roberts's art include Greek mythology, biblical and literary sources, Roman Classicism, and painters associated with specific genres, such as Henri Fantin-Latour and Balthus, among others. He has generally looked to these sources as launching points for new compositional and thematic ideas—introducing enigmatic, private objects and details—rather than for their direct subject matter or symbolic content. Critics suggest that Roberts's attachment to traditional sources expresses a desire to retain or retrieve timeless values (aesthetics, beauty, skill) that contemporary art seemingly rejected, as well as peculiarly American experiences, objects and ways of life. Charles Michener wrote, "The driving concern in Roberts's art seems, more precisely, southern American in its yearning to arrest the reckless momentum of a democratic society that creates a spiritual vacuum."

Stone Roberts, English Forcer Still Life, Oil on linen, 27" x 36", 2005.

Unlike the European masters, however, who used realism to factually document specific persons and settings, Roberts freely alters elements in his scenes, emphasizing contemporary senses of ambiguity, sensuality and the commonplace. While some writers detect a modern knack for narrative tension and psychological portraiture in his work, others point to enigmatic elements—incongruous or eccentric details and juxtapositions, unnerving perspectives and offhanded arrangements. They regard his work as mysterious and irreducible to clear-cut explanation, or in Michener's words, less about revelation than reverberation. In this vein, Roberts has been compared to modern representational painters such as Lennart Anderson and John Koch, among others.

From about 1982 to 2000, Roberts alternated between ambitious, time-consuming figurative tableau and still lifes in which he pushed his explorations of paint handling, color and form. The figurative works were set within timeless New York apartments decorated with displayed signs of Southern gentility, lavish curtains and Oriental rugs; they often involved extensive preparatory sketches and graphite drawings to work out compositions, poses (of friends and family) and ideas. In the 2000s, he expanded his figurative works to New York street scenes, while continuing to paint still lifes.

=== Figurative works ===
Roberts's first large-scale realistic work was Janet (1982–84), a formally structured, somewhat muted painting of a frontally placed woman in an interior with a dog, a still life, and enigmatic objects (a broken wine glass, fallen amaryllis blossom) that evoked a sense of emotional uncertainty. The work, which referenced Vermeer in composition and treatment of light, was acquired by the Metropolitan Museum of Art a year after its completion.

Roberts's 1986 solo debut was anchored by The Conversation (1984–85), a 7.5-foot, ten-person tableau of carefully choreographed gestures and male-female relationships within a contemporary social gathering. Inspired by Virgil's story of Dido and Aeneas, it was his first "conversation piece", a genre introduced by Dutch and Flemish masters, which depicted groups of figures engaged in everyday activities. New York Times critic Vivien Raynor wrote that Roberts created mystery in the work by "introducing a sense of Southern graciousness into scenes that are manifestly Northern"—in this case, a uniformed maid and anachronistic classical columns within a Manhattan apartment. In 1990, the artist returned to Asheville to paint the conversation piece, The William A. V. Cecil Family, a portrait commissioned by the present-day descendants of the Vanderbilt family for the Biltmore Mansion, which required extensive historical research.

Over the next decade, Roberts produced a body of work that American Artist called images of upper-middle-class Protestant culture and marriage of "perfect anthropological pitch" in their orchestration of decorative details, spatial settings, light, gesture and motion. In several paintings, he presented intimate, possibly confessional, glimpses of women (primarily modeled by his wife, Betsey) in moments of interacting, dressing or resting. Of note was the balance this work struck between specificities (e.g., capturing the textures of a creased lampshade, slip or knee) and overall effect, including the "energetic charge" of the figures' sometimes uncomfortable relationships.

Roberts cast himself and his wife as lovers (or possibly spouses) in Paul and Caro (1992), an image inspired by a biblical tale and a novel (Shirley Hazzard's The Transit of Venus) that explored self-exposure and concealment in marriage; the brooding work combined traditional technique with modern devices: sharply tilted, flattened space, subtly different, exaggerated perspectives, and ambiguous action to create an uneasy sense of instability. Using a similar reclining pose inspired by the myth of Danaë, Roberts created two strongly contrasting images. In Spring, Hillsdale (1997), a woman's rumpled blouse and two looming windows (framing a laborer and a husband seemingly faced off) suggest an uncertain, possibly fraught, drama; Interior, Light (2002) reveals a hushed moment of private repose in an elegant interior dominated by a bright saffron wrap and opulent patterning. In Interior, Evening (1997–98), Roberts created a dusky composition of sliding, unstable angles held together by the delicate poise of a woman in a slip with her back turned.

Stone Roberts, Grand Central Terminal: An Early December Noon in the Main Concourse, Oil on linen, 74" x 76", 2009/2012.

=== Street and architectural scenes ===
In the early 2000s, Roberts turned to large street scenes, extending the cityscapes glimpsed through windows in prior work to the whole canvas. Paintings like Early Autumn, Looking South (2001), A Bend in the Road (2003–4) and others captured the unplanned randomness of New York life with complex compositions of residential neighborhoods, parks and public markets filled with unposed figures he assembled from photographs. Between 2005 and 2019, he has also turned to the streets of Rome as a subject.

Roberts's exhibitions at the Museum of New York (2012) and New Britain Museum (2015) included the commissioned painting Grand Central Terminal: An Early December Noon in the Main Concourse (2009–12), his first large architectural interior, which depicted the famed terminal full of life, diverse activity and complex lighting. He approached its multitude of figures—based on hundreds of photographs—in a Bruegel-like manner, making each one individualistic and of equal weight, highlighting the tension between anonymity and uniqueness in crowded urban spaces. His later work, The Lake in Central Park (2017), recalls Seurat's La Grande Jatte in its densely populated, detailed depiction of genteel outdoor activity and gradations of light.

=== Still life paintings ===
Critic James F. Cooper described Roberts's painted still lifes in one review as "exquisitely composed and crafted crystal ware, pewter, flowers and fruit, arranged on textiles and cloths of rich fabrics and colors [that] evoke favorable comparison with the Dutch school." Like those artists, he compresses objects in small interior spaces that nonetheless imply a wider universe of aesthetics, order and beauty. He diverges, however, from the clear allegorical intentions of old masters with works that are open-ended and sometimes eccentric in their choice of modern elements, arrangements and expression.

Roberts's first still lifes (e.g., Mineolas Still Life, 1983) combined recurrent objects, horizontally structured divisions created by table edges and a classical faithfulness to description with dramatic approaches to composition and pictorial relationships. In subsequent paintings, he introduced subtle elements of whimsy and expressiveness pushing the work beyond realism: unexpected objects (e.g., a plastic kitchen timer), larger-than-life-size scaling, high-key color palettes, and differently lit elements within sometimes-overflowing compositions (e.g., Lemons, Lilies and Gourds, 1986–87; August Still Life, 1989). Later still lifes, from Fruit, Kleist and Dahlias (1991–92) to English Forcer Still Life (2005), juxtaposed more personal objects—a paperback novel, cheap corkscrew, restaurant matchbook, eyeglasses or suspenders—that seemed to signal a greater level of self-exposure, yet remained inscrutable.

Roberts extended that approach to a body of spare floral paintings influenced by Fantin-Latour that he initiated in the late 1980s and continued into the 2000s. Between 2006 and 2017, he painted a series of more minimal set-ups of branches of various fruit tied by string like mobiles and set against simple grounds (e.g., Three Pears and Their Leaves Held by a String, 2011–12).

== Collections ==
Roberts's work belongs to the public collections of the Asheville Art Museum, the Biltmore Estate (Asheville, NC), de Young Museum, Evansville Museum of Arts and Science, Flint Institute of Arts, Louis-Dreyfus Collection, Metropolitan Museum of Art, and New Britain Museum of American Art, as well as to many private and corporate collections.
