= Patricia Renee' Thomas =

American painter (born 1995)

- Born: 1995 (age 30–31); Philadelphia, Pennsylvania
- Education: Tyler School of Art
- Known for: Painter

Patricia Renee' Thomas (born 1995) is an American painter, draftswoman, and art educator based in Philadelphia.

== Early life and education ==
Thomas is the second of four daughters born to Mark Thomas and Dawn Renee' Snipes. She was born in Philadelphia, Pennsylvania, the second oldest of four sisters and graduated from Temple University's Tyler School of Art. She received her Masters in Fine Arts from The University of Pennsylvania's Weitzman School of Design with a Certificate in Education.

== Artistic practice ==
Thomas's earlier work examines themes of beauty in Western figure painting while referencing the visual history of blackness. As the work expanded, she looks to remedy lived and inherited experiences, calling back to her girlhood to rewrite memory and create the opportunity for reflection and rest. Thomas' work references advertising's longstanding use of blackness and that relationship to the historical exploitation of African-Americans.

Thomas lectured at University of Pennsylvania as well as taught Painting and Drawing at Temple University's Tyler School of Art and Architecture Continuing Education. She is also a fine arts teacher at Church of the Advocate in North Philadelphia.
