= Polly Apfelbaum =

American visual artist (born 1955)

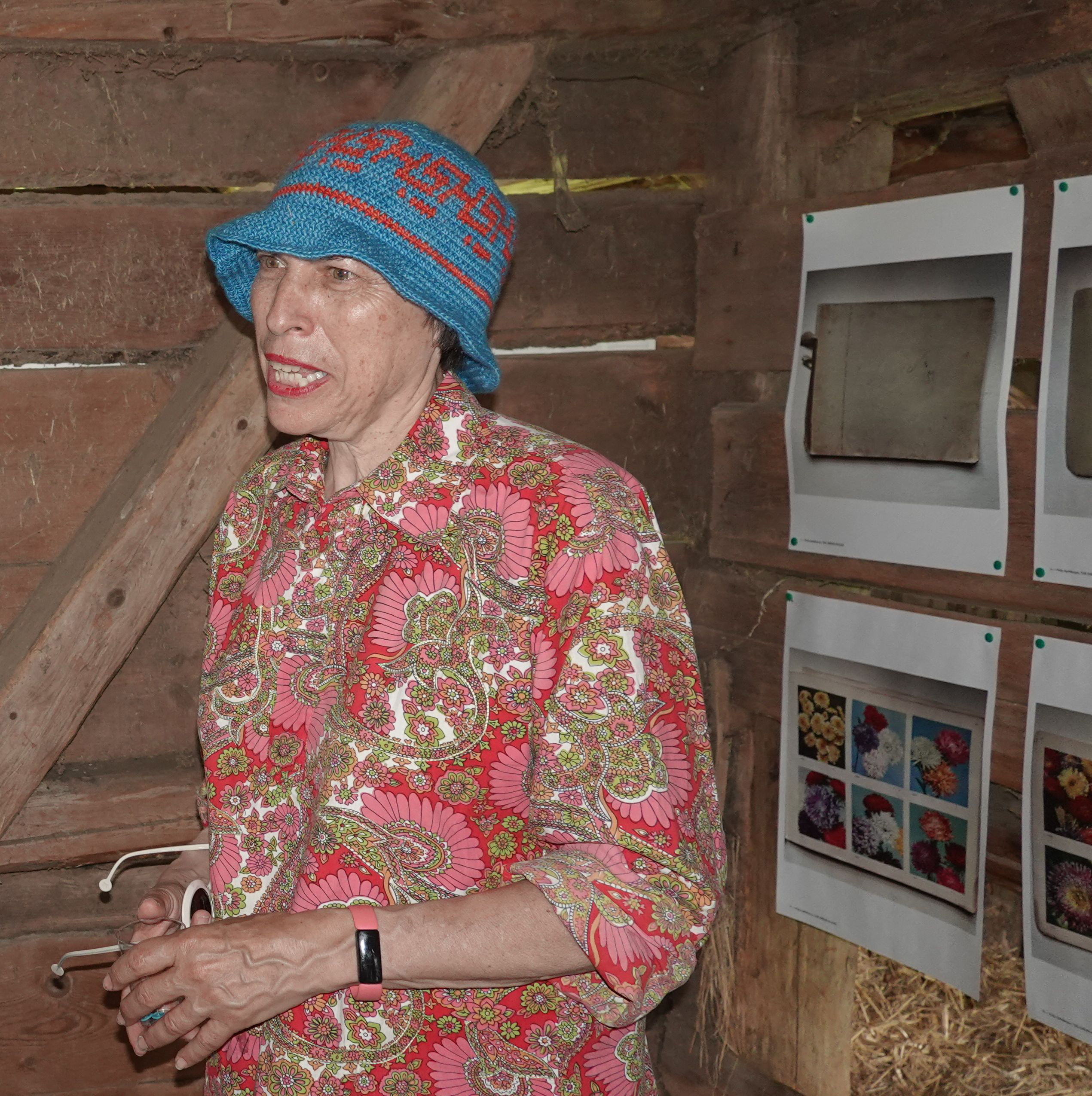
- Polly Apfelbaum, 2021, at Atelier Amden, Switzerland
- Born: July 4, 1955 (age 70); Abington, Pennsylvania, United States
- Education: Tyler School of Art (BFA); SUNY Purchase College
- Occupation: Visual artist
- Known for: Sculpture, drawing, mixed media
- Movement: Contemporary art
- Website: www.pollyapfelbaum.com

Polly E. Apfelbaum (born July 4, 1955) is an American contemporary visual artist, who is primarily known for her colorful drawings, sculptures, and fabric floor pieces, which she refers to as "fallen paintings". She has lived in New York City, New York since 1978.

== Biography ==
Polly Apfelbaum was born in 1955 in Abington Township, Montgomery County, Pennsylvania.

In 1978, Apfelbaum received her BFA degree from the Tyler School of Art in Elkins Park, Pennsylvania. She also received training from SUNY Purchase College in New York.

She has been showing her work consistently in the United States and internationally since her first one-person show in 1986. Apfelbaum came to prominence in the 1990s and is best known for what the artist refers to as her "fallen paintings." These large-scale, 'anti-monumental', horizontal installations consist of hundreds of hand-cut and hand-dyed pieces of velvet fabric that are arranged on the floor. These installations exist as a hybrid between painting and sculpture and occupy an ambiguous space between the two genres. Lane Relyea states "Apfelbaum's work is both painting and sculpture, and perhaps photography and fashion and formless material process as well."

In 2003, a major mid-career survey show of Apfelbaum's work opened at the Institute of Contemporary Art, Philadelphia. The show traveled through 2004 to the Contemporary Arts Center in Cincinnati, Ohio, and the Kemper Museum of Contemporary Art in Kansas City, Missouri. In conjunction with the exhibition, a catalogue surveying 15 years of the artist's work was published by the Institute of Contemporary Art, Philadelphia.

== Exhibitions ==
Polly Apfelbaum has exhibited widely since the 1980s, including one-person exhibitions at: Alexander Gray Associates (2017); Otis College of Art and Design, Los Angeles, CA (2016); la chapelle Saint-Jean (Le Sourn), part of L’art dans les chapelles – 26e édition (2017); National Museum of Women in the Arts; 56 Henry (2016); Bepart, Waregem, Belgium (2015); Clifton Benevento (2014); Worcester Art Museum, Worcester, MA (2014); lumber room, Portland, OR (2014); Burlington City Arts Center (2014); Mumbai Art Room, Mumbai, India (2013).

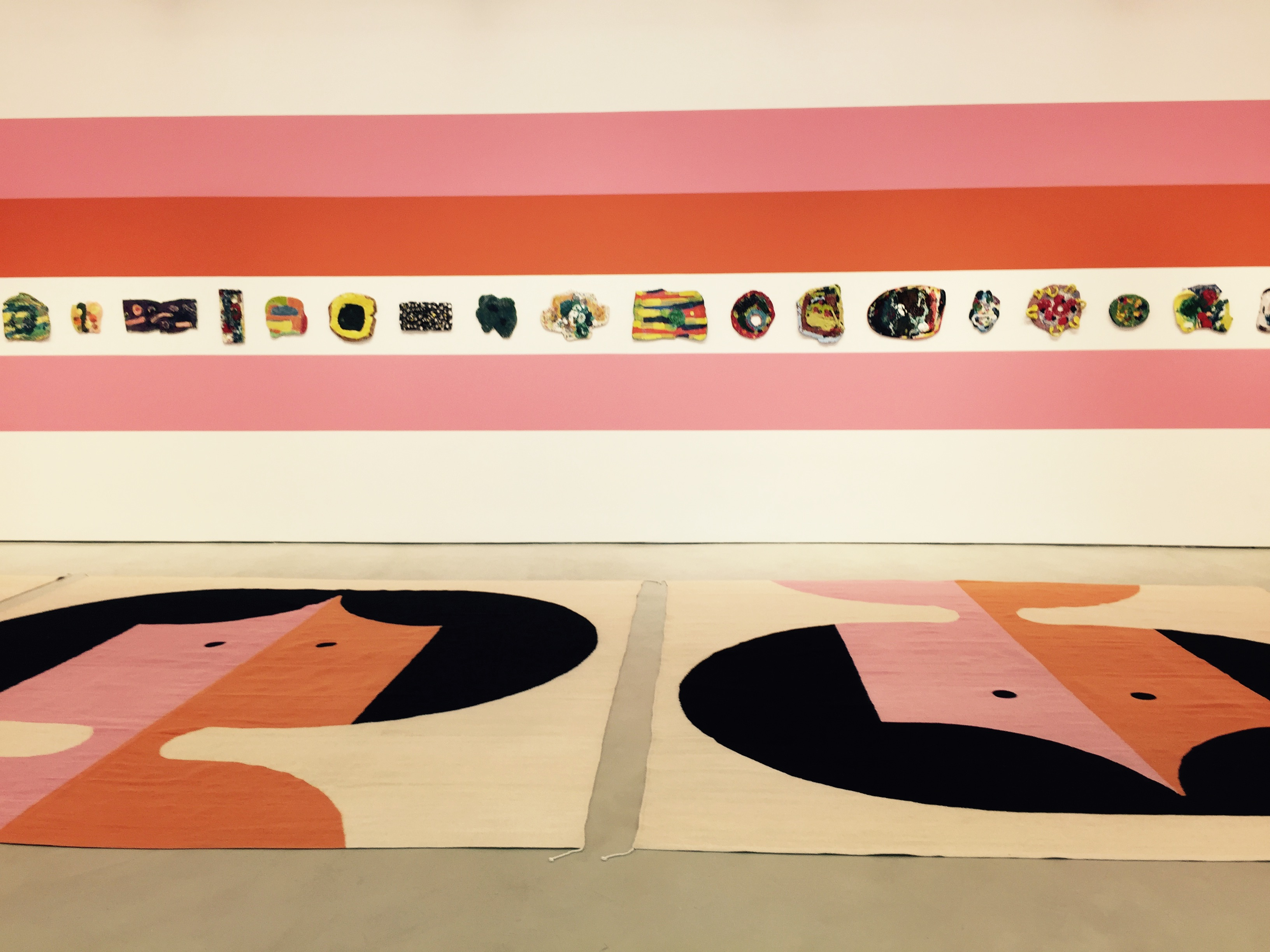
Detail of "The Potential of Women" at Alexander Gray, New York, NY, September 7 - October 21, 2017

Two person shows including: "The Sound of Ceramics" with Wang Lu (2016); "Erasing Tracing Racing Paint" with Dona Nelson (2016); "Karma Funk Factory" with Steven Westfall (2014); "For the Love of Gene Davis" with Dan Cole (2014); "Studiowork" with Nicole Cherubini (2010);

Her work has been featured in numerous group exhibitions including: An Irruption of the Rainbow, Los Angeles County Museum of Art, Los Angeles, CA (2016); Wall to Wall, MOCA Cleveland, Cleveland, OH (2016); Pretty Raw: After and Around Helen Frankenthaler, Rose Art Museum, Waltham, MA (2015); Three Graces, Everson Museum of Art, Syracuse, NY (2015); Pathmakers: Women in Art, Craft and Design, Midcentury and Today, Museum of Art and Design, New York (2015); AMERICANA: Formalizing Craft, Perez Art Museum Miami, Miami, FL (2013); Regarding Warhol: Sixty Artists, Fifty Years, Metropolitan Museum of Art, New York, (2012); Operativo, Museo Rufino Tamayo, Mexico City, (2001) The Night, San Francisco Art Institute, San Francisco; Reckless, Museum of Contemporary Art Kiasma; Helsinki, Finland; Skin and Bones, Bowdoin College, Brunswick, ME; What Does Love Have to Do With It, Massachusetts College of Art, Boston; Today I Love Everybody, Triple Candie, New York; and Crazy Love, Love Crazy, Contemporary Art Museum St. Louis, MO.

Apfelbaum's work has also been featured in a number of notable museum exhibitions including Sense and Sensibility: Women and Minimalism in the 90s, Comic Abstraction and Lines, Grids, Stains and Words, all at the Museum of Modern Art, New York; Painting-The Extended Field, Magasin 3, Stockholm, Sweden; Postmark: An Abstract Effect, Site Santa Fe, NM; Operativo, Museo Rufino Tamayo, Mexico City, Mexico; Sculpture as Field, Kunstverein Göttingen, Göttingen, Germany; The Eye of the Beholder, Dundee Contemporary Arts, Dundee, Scotland; As Painting: Division and Displacement, Wexner Center for the Arts, Columbus, OH; Flowers Observed, Flowers Transformed at The Warhol Museum, Pittsburgh, PA; and Extreme Abstraction, at the Albright-Knox Art Gallery, Buffalo, NY.

She was featured in several biennale’s including Beyond Borders Beaufort Biennial, Mu.ZEE, Ostend, Belgium, Lodz Biennale, Lodz, Poland; Painting Outside Painting, 44th Corcoran Painting Biennial at the Corcoran Museum of Art in Washington D.C.; Other, 4th Biennale D'art Contemporain de Lyon, France; Everyday, 11th Biennale of Sydney, Australia; and Bienal de Valencia, Valencia, Spain.

== Honors ==
In 2002 Apfelbaum was the recipient of an Academy Award from the American Academy of Arts and Letters. In 2012–2013, she was the recipient of the Joseph H. Hazen Rome Prize, a prize which is awarded to a select group of individuals who represent the highest standard of excellence in the arts and humanities. She has also been a recipient of a Joan Mitchell Grant, a Richard Diebenkorn Fellowship, a Guggenheim Fellowship in 1993, an Artist’s Fellowship from the New York Foundation for the Arts, and the Pollock-Krasner Foundation Grant.

== Public collections ==
Polly Apfelbaum's work is in a number of museum collections including:

- Armand Hammer Museum of Art, Los Angeles, California
- Austin Museum of Art, Austin, Texas
- Bowdoin College Museum of Art, Brunswick, Maine
- Brooklyn Museum of Art, Brooklyn, New York City, New York
- Bronx Museum of the Arts, Bronx, New York City, New York
- Cantor Center for Visual Arts at Stanford University, Stanford, California
- Carnegie Museum of Art, Pittsburgh, Pennsylvania
- Dallas Museum of Art, Dallas, Texas
- Des Moines Art Center, Des Moines, Iowa
- Everson Museum of Art, Syracuse, New York
- FRAC Nord–Pas de Calais, Dunkerque, France
- Frances Young Tang Teaching Museum and Art Gallery at Skidmore College, Saratoga Springs, New York
- Henry Art Gallery, Seattle, Washington
- Israel Museum, Jerusalem, Israel
- Kemper Museum of Contemporary Art, Kansas City, Missouri
- Magasin 3, Stockholm, Sweden
- Miami Art Museum, Miami, Florida
- Musée d'Art Moderne de Paris, Paris, France
- Museum of Modern Art, New York City, New York
- Museum of Contemporary Art, Chicago, Illinois
- National Academy Museum, New York City, New York
- National Museum of Women in the Arts, Washington, D.C.
- New Mexico Museum of Art, Santa Fe, New Mexico
- Perez Art Museum Miami, Miami, Florida
- Pennsylvania Academy of Fine Art, Philadelphia, Pennsylvania
- Philadelphia Museum of Art, Philadelphia, Pennsylvania
- Princeton University Art Museum, Princeton, New Jersey
- RISD Museum of Art, Providence, Rhode Island
- Speed Art Museum, Louisville, Kentucky
- University of Michigan Museum of Art, Ann Arbor, Michigan
- Whitney Museum of American Art, New York City, New York
- Worcester Art Museum, Worcester, Massachusetts
- Yale University Art Gallery, New Haven, Connecticut
