= Winifred Ann Lutz =

American sculptor, fiber artist, and environmental artist

- Born: 1942 (age 83–84)
- Known for: Sculpture, fiber art, environmental art

Winifred Ann Lutz (born 1942) is an American sculptor, fiber artist, and environmental artist known for her site-integrated installations and handmade paper-making. She is recognized as a key innovator in the field of hand papermaking as an art form. She is currently the Laura Carnell Professor Emeritus in sculpture at the Tyler School of Art at Temple University in Philadelphia, Pennsylvania.

== Education ==
She graduated from Cleveland Institute of Art with a BFA in 1965, where she triple majored in Sculpture, Ceramics, and Printmaking. Also in 1965, she studied at Atelier 17 in New York City with Stanley William Hayter. She attended Cranbrook Academy of Art and received an MFA in 1968.

From 1965 to 1966 Lutz received the Gund Scholarship to study and travel in Egypt and Europe. In 1979, Lutz traveled to Japan and Korea on a Ford Foundation grant where she was able to study Japanese and Korean paper-making and Japanese gardens.

== Exhibitions and collections ==
Past locations of her installations have included MoMA PS1, the Brooklyn Museum, the Brooklyn Bridge Anchorage, the Institute of Contemporary Art of the University of Pennsylvania, the Contemporary Arts Center in Cincinnati, OH and the Aldrich Contemporary Art Museum in Ridgefield, CT.

Her permanent projects include the Garden for The Mattress Factory in Pittsburgh, Pennsylvania and Mason-Dixon Lines, Past to Present at the American Philosophical Society Museum in Philadelphia, Pennsylvania.

Lutz's works have been included in such private, corporate, and public collections as the Albright-Knox Art Gallery, Buffalo, New York; the Art Institute of Chicago, Chicago, Illinois; the Cleveland Museum of Art, Cleveland, Ohio; Desert Museum, Palm Springs, California; Mount Holyoke College, South Hadley, Massachusetts; Newark Museum, Newark, New Jersey; and others.
