= Deborah Margo =

Canadian multimedia artist (born 1961)

- Born: 1961 (age 64–65); Montreal, Quebec
- Education: Tyler School of Art at Temple University (MFA); Banff Centre School of Fine Arts; Concordia University (BFA); Haystack Mountain School of Crafts
- Known for: Installation artist, sculptor, graphic artist
- Website: Artist website

Deborah Margo (born 1961 in Montreal, Quebec) is a Canadian multimedia artist known for her temporary installations, sculpture, and drawings. Her work has been exhibited in Canada, the United States, and Mexico. She currently lives and works in Ottawa, Ontario.

== Biography ==
Born in Montreal, Quebec, Margo attended the Haystack Mountain School of Crafts in Deer Isle, Maine before graduating from Concordia University in Montreal with a Bachelor in Fine Arts in 1984. Margo later attended the Banff Centre School of Fine Arts, before receiving a Masters of Fine Arts from the Tyler School of Art at Temple University in Philadelphia. Margo has been a professor of sculpture at the University of Ottawa since 1999.

== Work ==
Working with a variety of mediums, Margo's artistic practice focuses on temporary and ephemeral site-specific installations and object-making. Margo's practice is influenced by post-minimalism and methods of process art and her work often engages with themes of growth, change, the passage of time, impressions of travel, memory, and the identity of public and private spaces.

During her time at Concordia University, Margo participated in Interface, a student art event in Montreal that contributed to the rise of installation work on the Montreal art scene in the early 1980s. Margo continued to work with sculpture and installation, and graduated from the Tyler School of Art with an MFA in sculpture in 1990. She completed an artist residency at Struts Gallery in Sackville, New Brunswick in 1999, where she began an installation called Registers of Attendance. Other examples of her site-specific installation works include Reservoir – an Installation in Four Rooms (1994), Light-Earth Drawings for the Owens Art Gallery in Sackville, New Brunswick (2005), Medical Histories (2002–), Before and After Hurricane Irene (2011) and Apidictor Symphony created with multi-media artist Annette Hegel (2017).

Margo's work appears in the collections of the Ottawa Art Gallery, the City of Ottawa Art Collection, and the Owens Art Gallery. She has completed a number of public commissions around Ottawa, such as works for OC Transpo, as well as the new Ottawa Art Gallery's expansion project.
