= Charles Searles =

American artist

- Searles painting a mural c. 1975
- Born: Charles Robert Searles; July 11, 1937; Philadelphia, Pennsylvania, United States
- Died: November 27, 2004 (aged 67); New York
- Known for: painting, sculpture
- Notable work: "Filas for Sale"; "Celebration"

Charles Robert Searles (July 11, 1937 – November 27, 2004) was an African American artist born in Philadelphia in 1937. He studied at the Pennsylvania Academy of Fine Arts and was active from the 1960s until he died in 2004 from complications from a stroke.

== Education and career ==
Searles received the Cresson Traveling Scholarship and the Ware Traveling Memorial Scholarships which allowed him to travel to Nigeria, Ghana, and Morocco in 1972. He was one of several Black students to win the Cresson scholarship: Laura Wheeler Waring, Ellen Powell Tiberino, Raymond Saunders and Louis B. Sloan.

Upon his return he created a series of works titled Nigerian Impressions. One notable work painted in 1972 was Filas for Sale which depicted colorful images of masks and patterns that fill the frame of the painting. He received his first commission when he was asked to paint a mural at the William H. Green Federal Building in Philadelphia in 1974. The work Celebration, a study for that mural, is owned by the Smithsonian American Art Museum but is not currently on view. It is a 27 1/2 x 81 3/4 in acrylic on canvas work that depicts masked dancers and colorful figures. Charles Searles was often inspired by music, and his Dancers series in 1975 showcased his ability to portray movement in his work. His piece Dance of the Twin Souls is on display at the Pennsylvania Academy of Fine Arts Museum. He lived in Philadelphia until 1978, when he moved to New York City. In the 1980s he began working on a series of large sculptures including Warrior (1987) and Freedom's Gate (2000) which were between 8 and 10 feet tall. He died in 2004 and is survived by his wife, Kathleen Spicer and his daughter, Vanessa Mitchell. Searles' work was included in the 2015 exhibition We Speak: Black Artists in Philadelphia, 1920s-1970s at the Woodmere Art Museum.

== Notable exhibitions ==
=== New Black Artists ===
Charles Searles was featured in the exhibit "New Black Artists" which was on view at the Brooklyn Museum from October 7 – November 10, 1969. It included a total of 49 works, 30 paintings and 19 sculptures, by 12 artists: Ellsworth Ausby, Clifford Eubanks, Jr., Hugh Harrell, William J. Howell, Tonnie Jones, Charles McGee, Ted Moody, Joseph Overstreet, Anderson J. Pigatt, Daniel Pressley, Charles Searles and Erik W. A. Stephenson. The exhibit was then on display at Columbia University from November 20 – December 12, 1969.

=== Universal Reflections of Color and Rhythm ===
Searles's work was displayed posthumously in an exhibition at Winston-Salem State University's Diggs Gallery. The exhibit, which was on view from February 8 – March 31, 2009. The exhibition displayed over 60 works of art by Searles that he created at the end of his life including painting, sculptures, and drawings.

=== Charles Searles: The Mask of Abstraction ===
La Salle University featured 52 works of Searles that were on display from March 11 – May 31, 2013 at the La Salle University Art Museum. The exhibition showed works from throughout his life, beginning with his figure drawings from the 1960s, sculptures and paintings from the 1970s, and later abstract works.

=== Charles Searles: In Motion ===
The Tyler School of Art at Temple University displayed 17 large-scale paintings and sculptures by Searles from April 20 – June 16, 2013. The exhibition also featured a symposium by students who performed dance and visual art pieces inspired by Searles.

=== Expanding the Legacy: New Collections on African American Art ===
The papers of Charles Searles were featured in an exhibit on view at the Lawrence A. Fleischmann Gallery in Washington D.C. from September 23, 2016 - March 21, 2017. The exhibition included papers, drawings, notebooks, and other materials from artists such as Henry Ossawa Tanner, Kehinde Wiley, and Alma Thomas. It showcased how these artists experienced and explored cultural identity, racism, and major political events in their personal writing.
