= Syd Carpenter =

African American artist

- Born: 1953 (age 71–72); Pittsburgh, Pennsylvania, U.S.
- Education: Tyler School of Art and Architecture
- Occupation(s): Visual artist, educator
- Known for: Ceramics, sculpture
- Awards: Pew Fellowship in the Arts; Anonymous Was A Woman Award
- Website: syd-carpenter.swarthmore.edu

Syd Carpenter (born 1953) is an African American artist and a retired professor of studio art. She is known for her ceramic and sculpture work, which explores African-American farming and gardening. She has received multiple fellowships, including a Pew Fellowship and an NEA Fellowship, and her work is currently in the Smithsonian American Art Museum's collection and the Philadelphia Museum of Art's collection.

== Early life and education ==
Carpenter was born in Pittsburgh, Pennsylvania in 1953. She earned her Bachelors of Fine Art in 1974 and Master of Fine Art in 1976 from the Tyler School of Art and Architecture.

== Career ==
External videos
- “Ceramic artist Syd Carpenter”, PBS. 11/01/22.

In 1991, Carpenter began teaching at Swarthmore College as a Professor of Studio Art, where she would teach until her retirement in the fall of 2022, resulting in the college no longer offering ceramic classes. At Swarthmore, she was appointed to the Endowed Peggy Chan Professorship of Black Studies in January 2021. In 1992, she was awarded the Pew Fellowship in the Arts.

In 2014, Carpenter's exhibit "“Syd Carpenter: More Places of Our Own" was one of the two exhibits that the African American Museum in Philadelphia received a $50,000 award from the Knight Foundation to enhance. In 2021, Carpenter and artist Steve Donegan, designed and constructed "hugel mounds" at Woodmere Museum as environmental art pieces. From January–May 2022, her exhibit Earth Offerings: Honoring the Gardeners, inspired by the legacy of Black farmers, was displayed in the Rowan University Art Gallery. In May 2022, her piece, Mary Lou Furcron, was included in the Smithsonian American Art Museum exhibit, “This Present Moment: Crafting a Better World." In November 2022, Carpenter was named one of Anonymous Was a Woman (AWAW) 2022 award recipients, receiving $25,000. On December 16, 2022, Carptenter appeared in the award-winning documentary series, Craft in America episode "Home,” alongside artists Biskakone Greg Johnson, Wharton Esherick, and Sim Van der Ryn.

== Collections ==
Carpenter's work is held in the permanent collections of the Smithsonian American Art Museum, the Metropolitan Museum of Art, and the Philadelphia Museum of Art, among other institutions.
