= James Sheehan (artist) =

James Sheehan (born 1964, San Francisco) is an artist based out of New York City known for his works in miniature. Sheehan studied art history and fine arts at U.C. Berkeley and completed his MFA at the Tyler School of Art in Philadelphia, and in Rome, Italy. He moved to New York City in 1994.

When working in miniature, Sheehan is intentionally playing with scale, depicting world events and the mundane with equal magnitude. His paintings are often no more than stamp sized and "reconfigure public events (often public fictions or lies) in terms of their visual organization (which, scaled down, seen from odd and unintended angles, are revealed as well-organized fakes)." When exhibited, they are frequently set into the wall of the gallery space to create a keyhole effect and magnifying glasses are provided for viewing. Sheehan also produces large scale works, including collage and mixed-media.

Sheehan has been the recipient of many grants, awards and residencies including the New York Foundation for the Arts, ARCUS Residency in Japan, Lower Manhattan Cultural Council Residency in the World Trade Center, the Pollock-Krasner, and Marie Walsh Sharpe Foundation Grant. He has presented lectures on his work at the Whitney Museum, National Academy Museum and the 92nd St Y Art Center in New York City. He was in the second to last Lower Manhattan Cultural Council residency at the World Trade Center in 2000 and knew many of the artists who would take residency there the following year. The events of September 11, 2001 had a deeply personal impact on him, which was reflected in his work during his 2001–2002 residency in Japan, where he "explored the power of image as a socio-political assault". The theme was revisited a decade later at the 2012 show at the New York State Museum, "Before the Fall: Remembering the World Trade Center".

== Selected solo shows ==
- 2015-16 “James Sheehan: Death of Malevich” –Year long installation The Drawing Center New York, NY
- 2015 “at the lek” Songs for Presidents Queens, NY
- 2002 “Paintings” Galerie Schedler Zurich, Switzerland
- 2000 “Paintings” Galerie Schedler Zurich, Switzerland
- 2000 “Pool” Joseph Rickards Gallery New York, NY
- 1999 “Paintings, James Sheehan” M du B, F, H & G, curated by Hudson Montreal, Quebec

== Selected group shows ==
- 2015 “Barely There” Lesley Heller Workspace New York, NY “Headstrong” Adam Baumgold Gallery New York, NY
- 2014 “Small” The Drawing Center New York, NY “’lil Artworld” Regina Rex / Harbor Gallery Brooklyn, NY
- 2012 "Before the Fall: Remembering the World Trade Center" New York State Museum Albany, NY
- 2011 “Wanderlust” Yes! Gallery Brooklyn, NY
- 2009 "2 x 3 x 10" vertexList Brooklyn, NY
- 2006 "181st Annual: An Invitational" The National Academy Museum New York, NY
- 2005 "Young American Artists of Today" Kolodzei Art Foundation Moscow, Russia
- 2005 "PpAaIiNnTtIiNnGg" ParaSite Art Space Beacon, NY "Interested Painting" Gallery 400 Chicago, IL
- 2004 "Working in Brooklyn” Brooklyn Museum of Art Brooklyn, NY
- 2003 Prague Biennale “Lazarus Effect” Veletrzni Palace Museum Prague, Czech Republic
- 2003 “Ehrensaal” Haus der Kunst Museum Munich, Germany
- 2003 “Ameri©an Dre@m” Ronald Feldman Gallery New York, NY “Water Water” The Rotunda Gallery Brooklyn, NY
- 2002 “Painting as Paradox” Artists Space New York, NY
- 2002 “Artists to Artists” ACE Gallery New York, NY
- 2002 “ARCUS Tokyo Exhibition” Contemporary Art Factory Tokyo, Japan
- 2001 “Everybody Now” The Bertha & Karl Leubsdorf Gallery at Hunter College New York, NY
- 2000 “The Figure: Another Side of Modernism” The Snug Harbor Cultural Center Staten Island, NY
- 1999 “The Sea, The Sea” Murray Guy Gallery New York, NY
- 1998 “Interactions” Montgomery Gallery, Pomona College Los Angeles, CA “Scale, Relatively Speaking” Art in General New York, NY
