= Tyler School of Art and Architecture =

American art school at Temple University

Coordinates: 39.983162°N 75.153556°W

- Former names: Stella Elkins Tyler School of Fine Arts (1935–1966), Tyler School of Art (1966–2019)
- Type: Art and architecture school
- Established: 1935 (as Stella Elkins Tyler School of Fine Arts)
- Parent institution: Temple University
- Dean: Susan E. Cahan
- Students: 1,550
- Location: Philadelphia, Pennsylvania, United States
- Campus: Urban
- Website: tyler.temple.edu

The Tyler School of Art and Architecture, frequently referred to by community members as simply Tyler, is part of Temple University, a large, urban, public research university in Philadelphia, Pennsylvania, United States. Tyler currently enrolls about 1,350 undergraduate students and about 200 graduate students in a wide variety of academic degree programs, including architecture, art education, art history, art therapy, ceramics, city and regional planning, community arts practices, community development, facilities management, fibers and material studies, glass, graphic and interactive design, historic preservation, horticulture, landscape architecture, metals/jewelry/CAD-CAM, painting, photography, printmaking, sculpture and visual studies.

Susan E. Cahan, has been Tyler's dean since 2017. It was formerly known as the Stella Elkins Tyler School of Fine Arts, and Tyler School of Art.

== History ==
The Tyler School of Art and Architecture was founded in 1935 by Stella Elkins Tyler (of the Elkins/Widener family) and sculptor Boris Blai. Arts patron Stella Elkins Tyler donated her estate in Elkins Park, Pennsylvania, to Temple University in the early 1930s. Tyler offered her estate with the expressed wish that, through Boris Blai, it would become an environment for the advancement of the fine arts, scholarly study in the arts and individual creativity. As founding dean of what was then known as the Stella Elkins Tyler School of Fine Arts, Blai instilled the school with a commitment to progressive education emphasizing the student's mastery of technique within the framework of a liberal arts curriculum.

In 1960, Charles Le Clair succeeded Blai. Under Le Clair, the Tyler campus was improved with construction of a residence hall and two studio/classroom buildings. In 1966, the school's name was changed to the Tyler School of Art, and Le Clair founded the Tyler Study Abroad program in Rome, Italy. Tyler's programs at Temple University Rome remain among the most respected fine arts study abroad programs in Europe today. Temple University Rome has expanded to include a full range of liberal arts, architecture, business and law courses with an emphasis on those relating to Rome, Italy and Europe. Throughout the 1960s and 1970s, Tyler's curriculum continued to grow in response to new definitions of art-making and the role of art in society. New programs and modern facilities in design, ceramics, glass, metals and photography were added. During this time, Tyler established Art History and Art Education departments on Temple's Main Campus in Philadelphia.

The pace of change and growth began to accelerate dramatically in the late 1990s. In 1998, Tyler opened Temple's Department of Architecture.

In 2009, Tyler moved from Elkins Park into a new, 250,000-square-foot building at Temple's Main Campus. Three years later, Architecture moved into a new 50,000-square-foot facility connected to the new Tyler building. Temple's programs in landscape architecture, horticulture, city and regional planning, and community development became part of Tyler in 2016, for the first time unifying all of the architecture and environmental design disciplines at Temple in one academic unit. In 2017, Susan E. Cahan, who came from Yale University became the first permanent dean of an independent Tyler since the school moved into its new building in 2009. On July 1, 2019, more than 20 years after Architecture at Temple became part of Tyler, the school's name officially became the Tyler School of Art and Architecture.

In 2017, arts administrator, art historian and curator Susan E. Cahan, formerly associate dean and dean for the arts at Yale College at Yale University, was appointed dean of the Tyler School of Art and Architecture by Temple President Richard M. Englert.

In 2018, Temple University's board of trustees approved changes to Tyler's structure and identity in order to unify the school, integrate disciplines in architecture and environmental design, support cross-disciplinary studies and reflect current understanding of creative practice and research. On July 1, 2019, the school's name officially expanded from the Tyler School of Art to the Tyler School of Art and Architecture.

== List of deans ==
- Boris Blai, dean (1935–1960)
- Charles Le Clair, dean (1960–1974)
- Donald M. Lantzy, acting dean (1974–1975)
- Jack Wasserman, dean (1975–1977)
- David Pease, interim dean (1977–1978) and dean (1978–1984)
- George V. Bayliss, dean (1984–1989)
- Rochelle Toner, dean (1989–2002)
- Hester Stinnett, acting dean (2002–2005)
- Keith Anthony Morrison, dean (2005–2008)
- Therese Dolan, interim dean (2008–2009)
- Robert Stroker, interim dean and dean of Center for the Arts (2009–2015)
- Hester Stinnett, interim dean (2015–2017)
- Susan E. Cahan, dean (2017–present)

== Academic programs and accreditation ==
The Tyler School of Art and Architecture offers a wide range of degree and certificate programs in the areas of art, architecture and environmental design, graphic design, art history and art education.

Temple also has a BA degree in art program at Temple University, Japan Campus, located in Tokyo.

== Facilities ==
In 2009 Tyler School of Art moved to a new location, a 255,000-square-foot building designed by architect Carlos Jiménez, Tyler's architecture program moved into a new, 50,000-square-foot Architecture Building in 2012. The two structures, which are connected by a passageway and are located at Temple University's Main Campus in Philadelphia. Their location adjacent to Presser Hall (part of Temple University's Boyer College of Music and Dance) and Temple Theaters (part of Temple's School of Theater, Film and Media Arts) has created an arts quadrant in the northeast corner of campus.

== Visiting artists and scholars ==
Tyler also hosts a variety of visiting artist, architect and scholar programs that bring leaders in their disciplines to the school to address the Tyler community and work with students in their classrooms and studios. Flagship visiting artist and scholar programs include:

The Jack Wolgin Annual Visiting Artist Symposium, an endowed visiting artist program that brings artists and thinkers to campus to work with Tyler students and present a free public lecture each year. Past Jack Wolgin Annual Visiting Artists:

- Judy Pfaff (2016)
- LaToya Ruby Frazier (2017)
- Rick Lowe (2018)
- Nick Cave (2019)
- Cecilia Vicuña (2020)
- Jennie C. Jones (2022)
- Hito Steyerl (2023)

Tyler Architecture alumni endowed a lecture series to honor Brigitte Knowles, professor emerita and former associate dean, that brings architects, landscape architects and designers to campus. Past lecturers include:

- Sir David Adjaye, founder and principal, Adjaye Associates
- Craig Edward Dykers, founding partner, Snøhetta
- Walter Hood, founder, Hood Design Studio
- Clive Wilkinson, president, Clive Wilkinson Architects
- Sharon Johnston (architect), founding partner, Johnston Marklee
- Olalekan Jeyifous (2022)

== Temple Contemporary ==
Temple Contemporary is Tyler's exhibitions and public programs unit. It was led by founding director Robert Blackson, Tyler's director of exhibitions and public programming from 2011 to 2021. Jova Lynne, formerly the Senior Curator of the Museum of Contemporary Art Detroit, was hired as the Director of Temple Contemporary in 2021. Temple Contemporary's galleries and offices are located in the Tyler building at Temple University's Main Campus, although much of its programming takes place in the surrounding Philadelphia community.

Temple Contemporary's community-focused programming that has earned national attention includes "Funeral for a Home" (2014), an extended commemoration of at-risk urban housing stock and the lives that soon-to-be-demolished homes contain; "reForm" (2014–2015), a response to the closure of public schools and its impact on urban communities and their children by artist and Tyler faculty member Pepón Osorio; and "Symphony for a Broken Orchestra" (2017–2018), a citywide effort to collect, display, repair and return broken instruments belonging to Philadelphia's public schools, highlighted by the composition of music for the broken instruments by composer David Lang (composer) and the music's performance by a diverse orchestra of local residents. All three of the projects above were funded in part by the Pew Center for Arts & Heritage.

== Notable alumni ==
=== A ===
- Polly Apfelbaum (BFA), mixed media artist, sculptor, drawer
- Timothy App (MFA 1974), painter, educator, curator

=== B ===
- Bill Beckley (MFA 1970), conceptual artist
- Stanley Bleifeld (BFA, MFA), sculptor
- Moe Brooker, artist
- Harriete Estel Berman, artist
- Karen Boccalero, artist, nun
- Regis Brodie, artist, Skidmore faculty member
- Anne Buckwalter (BFA 2010), painter

=== C ===
- Donald Camp, photographer, Ursinus faculty member
- Syd Carpenter, artist, 2022 Gallery of Success honoree
- Barbara Chase-Riboud, artist, novelist, poet
- Manon Cleary, painter
- Cecelia Condit, artist, Wisconsin-Milwaukee faculty member
- Chuck Connelly, painter
- Marsha Cottrell, artist
- Amber Cowan, artist

=== D ===
- Harvey Dinnerstein, painter, educator
- Alix Dobkin, singer-songwriter
- Angela Dufresne, painter, educator

=== E ===
- June Edmonds, painter and public artist
- Allan Edmunds, printmaker

=== F ===
- Anoka Faruqee, painter, Yale faculty member
- Louise Fishman, painter
- Peter Fox, artist
- Allan Randall Freelon, artist
- Nick Fudge, artist

=== G ===
- Doreen Garner, artist
- Frank Gaylord, sculptor
- Neil Goodman, sculptor, educator
- Deborah Grant, artist

=== H ===
- Trenton Doyle Hancock, artist
- Edgar Heap of Birds, artist
- Jessica Hische, illustrator, designer
- Sharon Horvath (MFA 1985), mixed media artist, painter, educator

=== J ===
- Catherine Jansen, photographer
- Martha Jackson Jarvis, artist

=== K ===
- Irvin Kershner, film director
- Simmie Knox, painter

=== L ===
- David Levine, artist, illustrator
- Stacy Levy, sculptor
- E. B. Lewis, illustrator
- Beth Lipman, glass artist

=== M ===
- Deborah Margo, artist
- Joan Marter, art historian, Rutgers faculty member
- Steven Montgomery, artist
- Judy Moonelis, ceramic artist
- Ayanah Moor, artist, SAIC faculty member
- Jim Morphesis, painter
- Ree Morton, artist
- Eleanor Moty, metalsmith, jewelry artist
- Nicholas Muellner, photographer, writer

=== N ===
- Lowell Blair Nesbitt, artist

=== P ===
- Albert Paley, artist
- Laura Parnes, artist
- Marlo Pascual, artist
- Janet Perr, designer, art director
- Amy Pleasant, painter
- Eric Pryor, president of Pennsylvania Academy of the Fine Arts

=== R ===
- Erin M. Riley, artist
- Stone Roberts, painter

=== S ===
- Paula Scher, designer
- Susan Sensemann, artist
- James Sheehan, artist
- Lorraine Shemesh, artist
- Sarai Sherman, painter
- Sondra Sherman, painter, jewelry artist
- Aaron Shikler, painter
- Lisa Sigal, artist
- Laurie Simmons, photographer
- Nina Sobell, artist
- Andrew Spence, artist
- Kara Springer, artist
- John Stango, artist
- Richard Sylbert, production designer

=== T ===
- Patricia Renee' Thomas, painter, draftswoman, and art educator
- Linda Threadgill, artist

=== V ===
- William Villalongo, artist
- Diana Vincent, jewelry artist

=== W ===
- Angela Washko, artist
- Hannah Wilke, sculptor, photographer

=== Y ===
- Lisa Yuskavage, painter

=== Z ===
- Paul O. Zelinsky, author, illustrator

== Notable current and past faculty ==
- Adela Akers, textile and fiber artist, taught from 1972 to 1995
- Philip Betancourt, archaeologist, art historian
- Richard Callner, painter
- John E. Dowell Jr., printmaker
- Coco Fusco, interdisciplinary artist, writer, curator
- Mark Thomas Gibson, painter, printmaker
- Hermann Gundersheimer, art historian
- Marcia B. Hall, art historian
- C.T. Jasper, sculptor
- Stanley Lechtzin, jeweler, metals artist
- Roberto Lugo, ceramic artist
- Winifred Lutz, sculptor
- Leah Modigliani, artist, Associate Professor of Visual Studies
- Keith Anthony Morrison, painter, printmaker, educator, critic, curator, arts administrator
- Dona Nelson, painter
- Odili Donald Odita, painter
- Karyn Olivier, sculptor, installation artist, photographer
- Pepón Osorio, video artist
- Gerda Panofsky-Soergel, art historian
- Rudolf Staffel, ceramic artist
- Robert Storr (art academic), art historian
- Stanley Whitney, painter
- Jessica Vaughn, sculptor
