= The Art of the Steal =

The Art of the Steal may refer to:

- The Art of the Steal (book), a 2002 book by Frank Abagnale about confidence tricks
- The Art of the Steal (2009 film), a documentary film about the relocation of the Barnes collection
- The Art of the Steal (In Plain Sight episode), a 2011 episode of the USA Network original series In Plain Sight
- The Art of the Steal (2013 film), a comedy film
