= Rebecca W. Rimel =

American executive

- Born: April 10, 1951 (age 75); Charlottesville, Virginia
- Education: UVA School of Nursing (B.S.); James Madison University (MBA)

Rebecca W. Rimel was the president and CEO of The Pew Charitable Trusts. She was succeeded in that position on July 1, 2020 by Susan K. Urahn.

Rimel joined the organization in 1983 as a health program manager, and became executive director five years later. She assumed the position of president and CEO in 1994.

Rimel began her tenure at The Pew Charitable Trusts in 1983, serving as health program manager. Rimel has executive leadership and experience in public policy and advocacy, particularly in the field of healthcare. From 1981 to 1983, she served as an assistant professor in the Department of Neurosurgery at the University of Virginia Health System. She was elected to the American Philosophical Society in 2000.

Rimel's role in the controversy surrounding the moving the art of the Barnes Foundation to downtown Philadelphia against the last wishes of Albert C. Barnes and the Friends of the Barnes is discussed critically in The Art of the Steal (2009_film). Rimel refused to discuss her role in the move of the artwork for the film. In his review of the film for Philanthropy Today William A. Schambra was also critical of Rimel's lack of transparency.

== Education ==
Rimes earned a bachelor of science degree, with distinction, from the UVA School of Nursing and a Master of Business Administration from James Madison University.
