= Charles Bregler =

American painter (1864–1958)

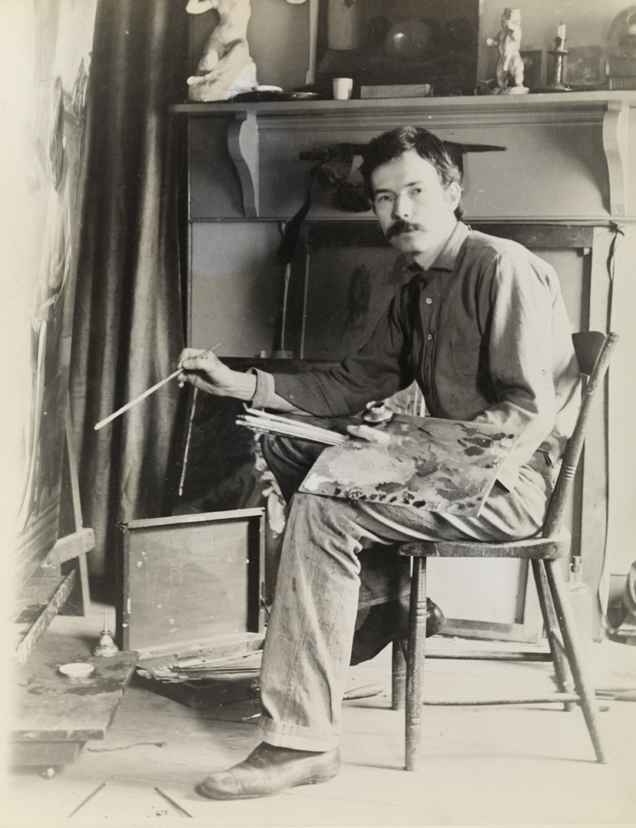
Charles Bregler in his studio, ca. 1895

Charles Bregler (May 1864–September 24, 1958) was an American portrait painter and sculptor, and a student (and disciple) of artist Thomas Eakins. Bregler wrote about Eakins's teaching methods, and amassed a large collection of his minor works, memorabilia and papers. Following Bregler's death, his widow safeguarded the collection for decades before selling it to The Pew Charitable Trusts in 1985, which donated it to the Pennsylvania Academy of the Fine Arts.

== Biography ==
Bregler's father died when he was 3, his mother died when he was 12, and he was raised by his paternal grandmother. He apprenticed as an artisan, learning to decorate fancy leather goods. As a teenager, he won a scholarship to the Franklin Institute's evening drawing classes.

Bregler enrolled at the Pennsylvania Academy of the Fine Arts in 1883. Eakins, who had trained at the École des Beaux-Arts, was director of the art school and its instructor in painting and drawing. In early January 1886, Eakins had a male model remove his loincloth during an anatomy lecture before either an all-female or a mixed male-and-female class. Using a fully nude male model was contrary to PAFA policy, and Eakins received a January 11 letter of reprimand. The "loincloth incident" ignited a firestorm of sordid accusations against Eakins, and he was forced to resign.

All 55 of the school's male students and 18 of the 30 female students signed petitions threatening to withdraw from PAFA unless Eakins was reinstated. PAFA's board declined to do so. Bregler was one of 16 students (all men) who left to form the Art Students' League of Philadelphia, with Eakins as their unpaid teacher. The League's tuition was initially set at $25, but was raised to $40 for the 8-month 1886-87 season, and finally $50. The school never had more than forty-one students, and sometimes had as few as twelve. Bregler was enrolled for all 7 years of the League's existence.

Bregler returned to PAFA in 1894 after the League's demise, and exhibited in PAFA's annual exhibitions: 1892, 1896, 1898 and 1903. He exhibited a portrait at the 1893 World's Columbian Exposition in Chicago, and one at the 1904 Louisiana Purchase Exposition in St. Louis. He was one of four former Eakins students who held a joint exhibition of paintings in Philadelphia in 1924. Bregler considered Eakins to have been an extraordinary teacher. In 1931, he published two articles describing Eakins's teaching methods in the magazine The Arts.

Bregler's first wife was Elizabeth Yohn (1871–1944), with whom he lived at 4935 N. 11th Street, in the Logan section of North Philadelphia. In the 1950s he married Mary Picozzi (1907–1987), who was more than 40 years his younger. They sold the North Philadelphia house and he moved into her rowhouse in South Philadelphia.

== Bregler Collection ==
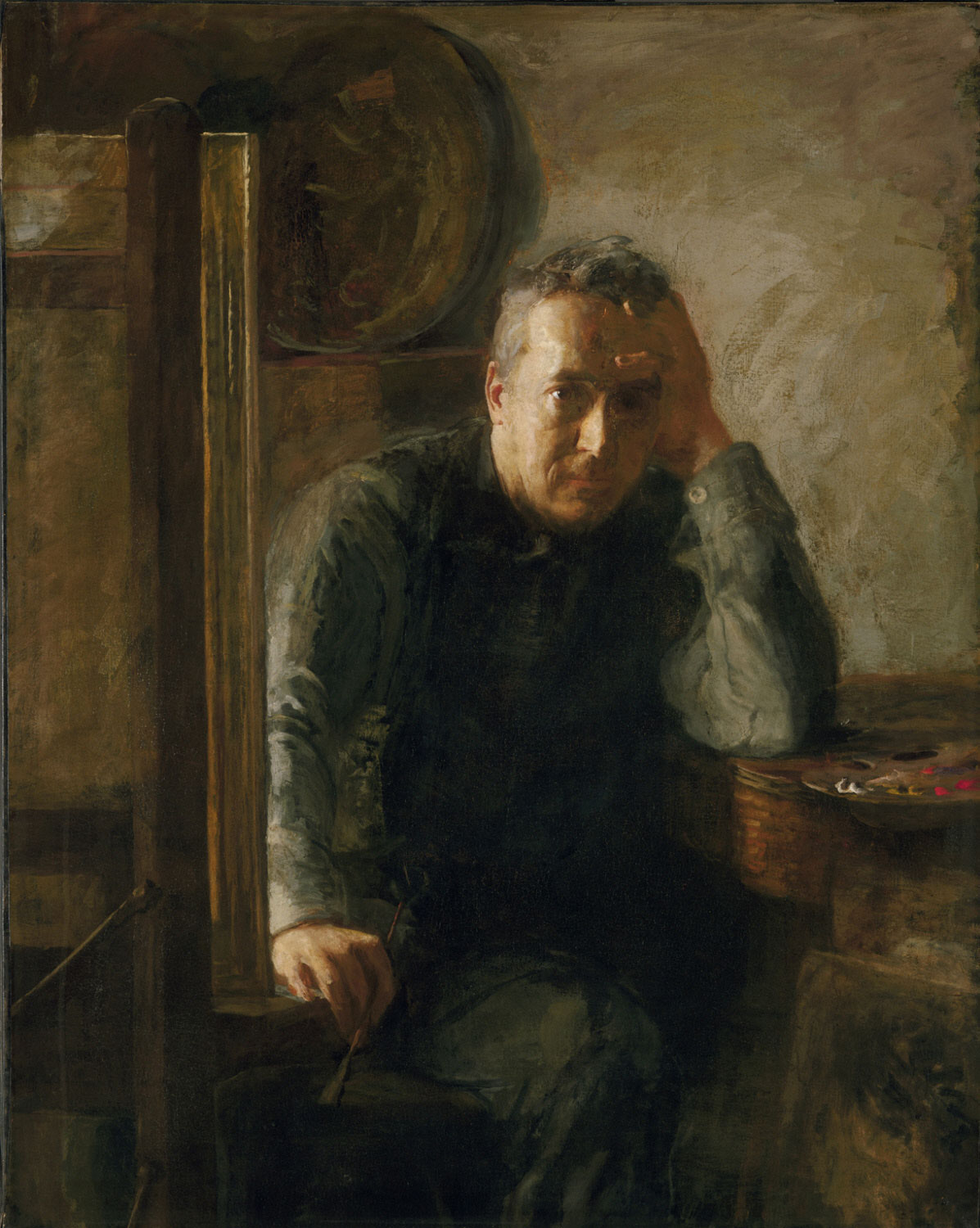
Portrait of Thomas Eakins (1920s) by Susan Macdowell Eakins, Philadelphia Museum of Art, 1939 gift of Charles Bregler

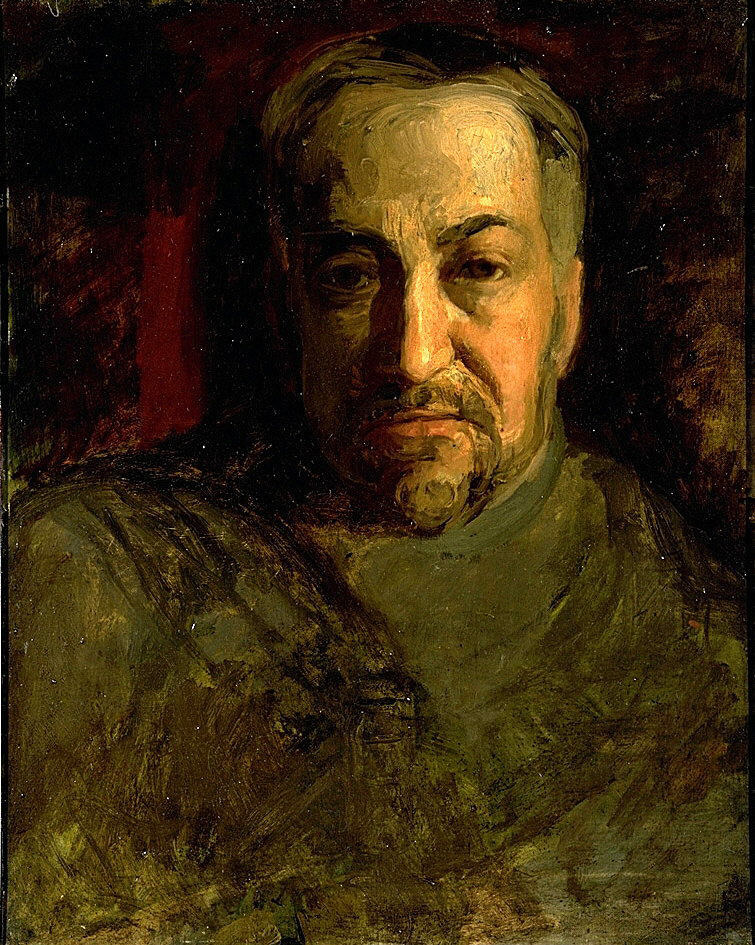
Self-portrait (c. 1902) by Thomas Eakins, Hirshhorn Museum and Sculpture Garden

Following Eakins's 1916 death, Bregler acted as assistant to his widow, Susan Macdowell Eakins (1851–1938), helping to catalogue, frame and clean his paintings. She gave Bregler a number of her husband's works, including one of only two known self-portraits (the other was Eakins's "diploma" portrait for the National Academy of Design). She also painted at least two portraits of Bregler.

Following Mrs. Eakins's 1938 death, her executors emptied the house at 1729 Mount Vernon Street, removing the items that they deemed salable at auction. Bregler described the aftermath as the "most tragic and pitiful sight I ever saw. Every room was cluttered with debris as all the contents of the various drawers, closets etc. were thrown upon the floor as they removed the furniture. All the life casts were smashed... I never want to see anything like this again." "He gathered up letters, photographs, glass negatives, drawings, oil sketches, plaster casts, and clothing. Among the assortment of memorabilia he retrieved were the letters Eakins had written from Paris and the Dakota Territory, affidavits from William and Frances Crowell, the artist's paintbrushes and cowboy outfit, and an old leather wallet that Bregler had presumedly made and presented to Eakins."

Bregler rescued a trove of Eakins's minor works, and disobeyed Mrs. Eakins's instructions to burn certain items. Of later importance to scholars, he rescued her journals listing when the works had been painted, where they had been exhibited, and to whom they had been sold or given. She had painted a posthumous portrait of her husband in the 1920s (probably from a photograph). Bregler donated the portrait to the Philadelphia Museum of Art in 1939, and later donated a sketch related to PMA's William Rush Carving His Allegorical Figure of the Schuylkill River.

Bregler helped to organize the 1944 centennial exhibition of Eakins's works at PMA. He sold a number of Eakins works in the 1940s and 1950s, many of which are now in the collection of the Hirshhorn Museum and Sculpture Garden. He also donated a group of Eakins photographs to the Metropolitan Museum of Art.

Following Bregler's death in 1958, his widow Mary safeguarded the collection in their South Philadelphia rowhouse. She resisted requests from art dealers to see the works or offers to broker a sale of them. At the urging of her attorney, William J. Kelly, Mary Bregler allowed PAFA curator Kathleen A. Foster and art historian Elizabeth Milroy to examine the works in 1983. That visit led to PAFA's 1985 purchase of the collection, with grants provided by the Mable Pew Myrin Trust and other funds.

PAFA's Bregler Collection consists of nearly 1,600 items—29 paintings (most oil sketches for larger works), 12 sculptures, 261 drawings, 535 photographs, about 380 glass-plate negatives, 361 documents, and memorabilia such as Eakins's watercolor box and paintbrushes.

=== Thomas Eakins works once owned by Bregler ===
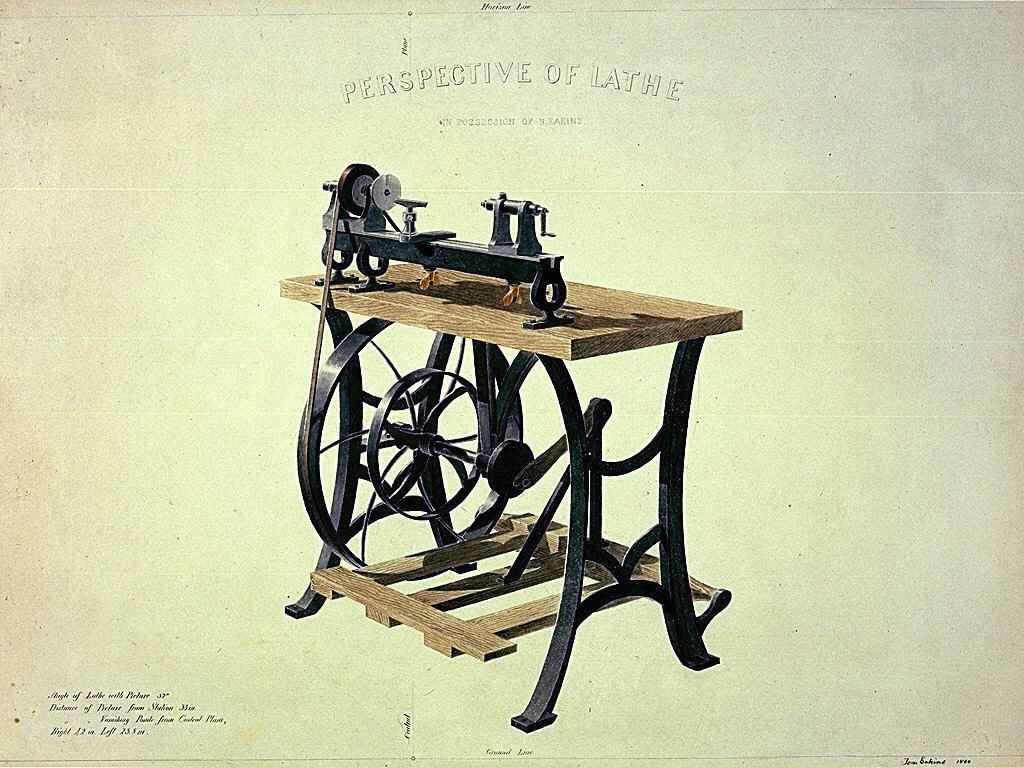
Perspective of a Lathe (1860), Hirshhorn Museum and Sculpture Garden

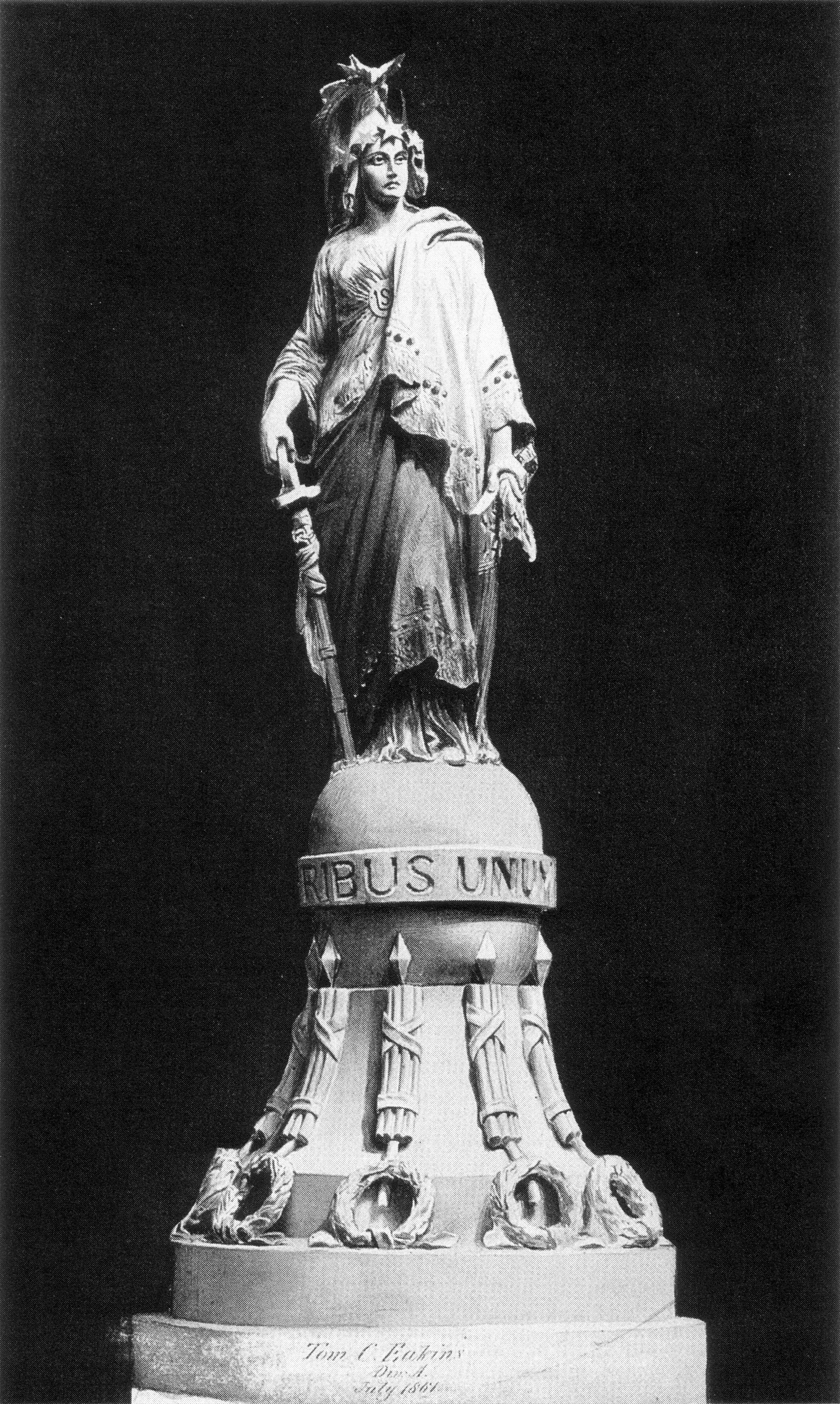
Drawing of The Statue of Freedom (1861), Pennsylvania Academy of the Fine Arts

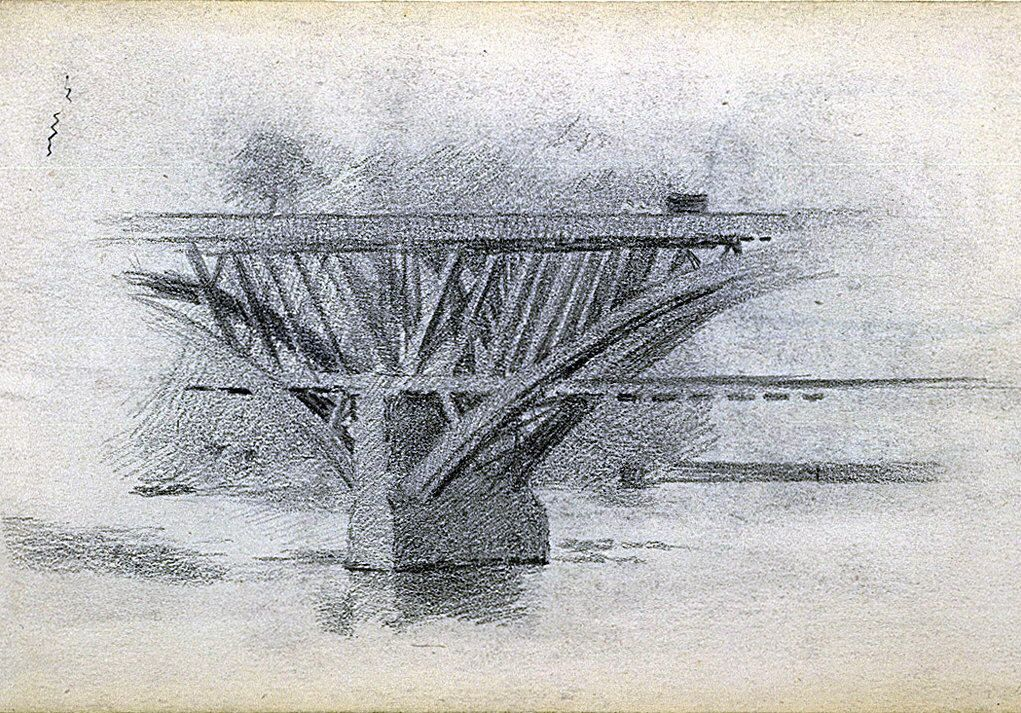
Drawing of Girard Avenue Bridge (c. 1871), Study for Max Schmitt in a Single Scull, Hirshhorn Museum and Sculpture Garden

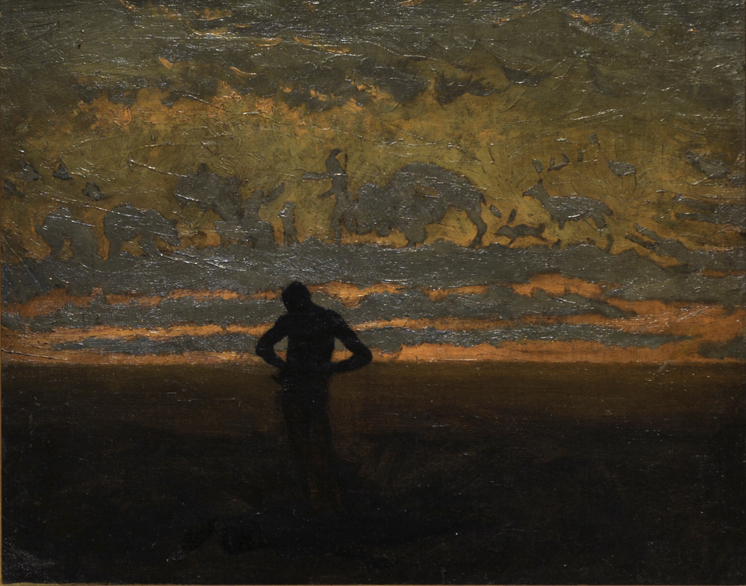
Study for Hiawatha (c. 1871-75), Hirshhorn Museum and Sculpture Garden

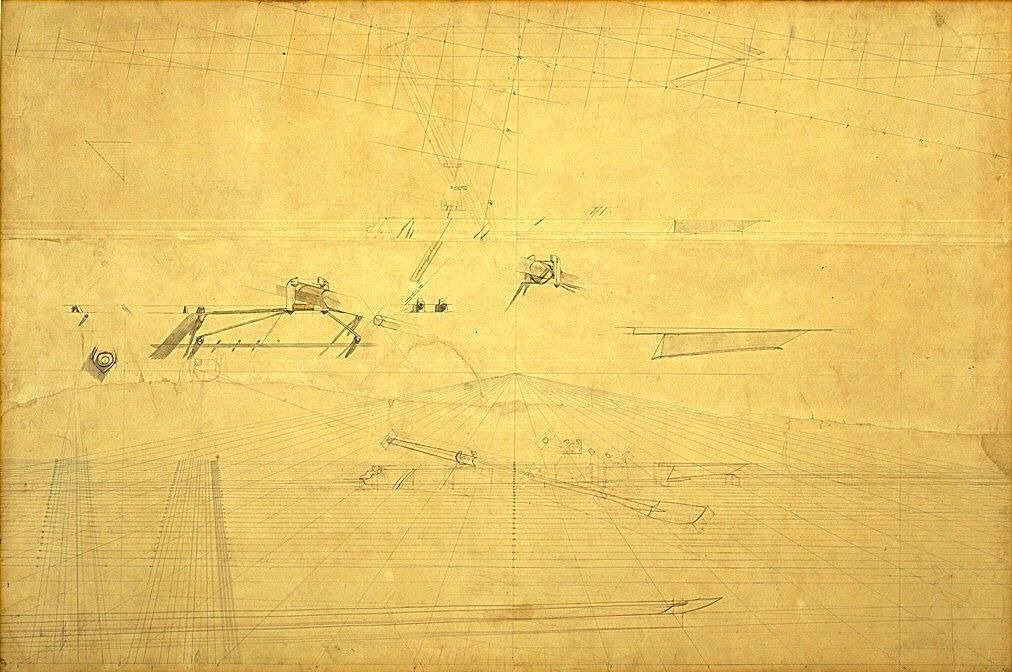
Perspective drawing for The Biglin Brothers Turning The Stake (c. 1873), Hirshhorn Museum and Sculpture Garden

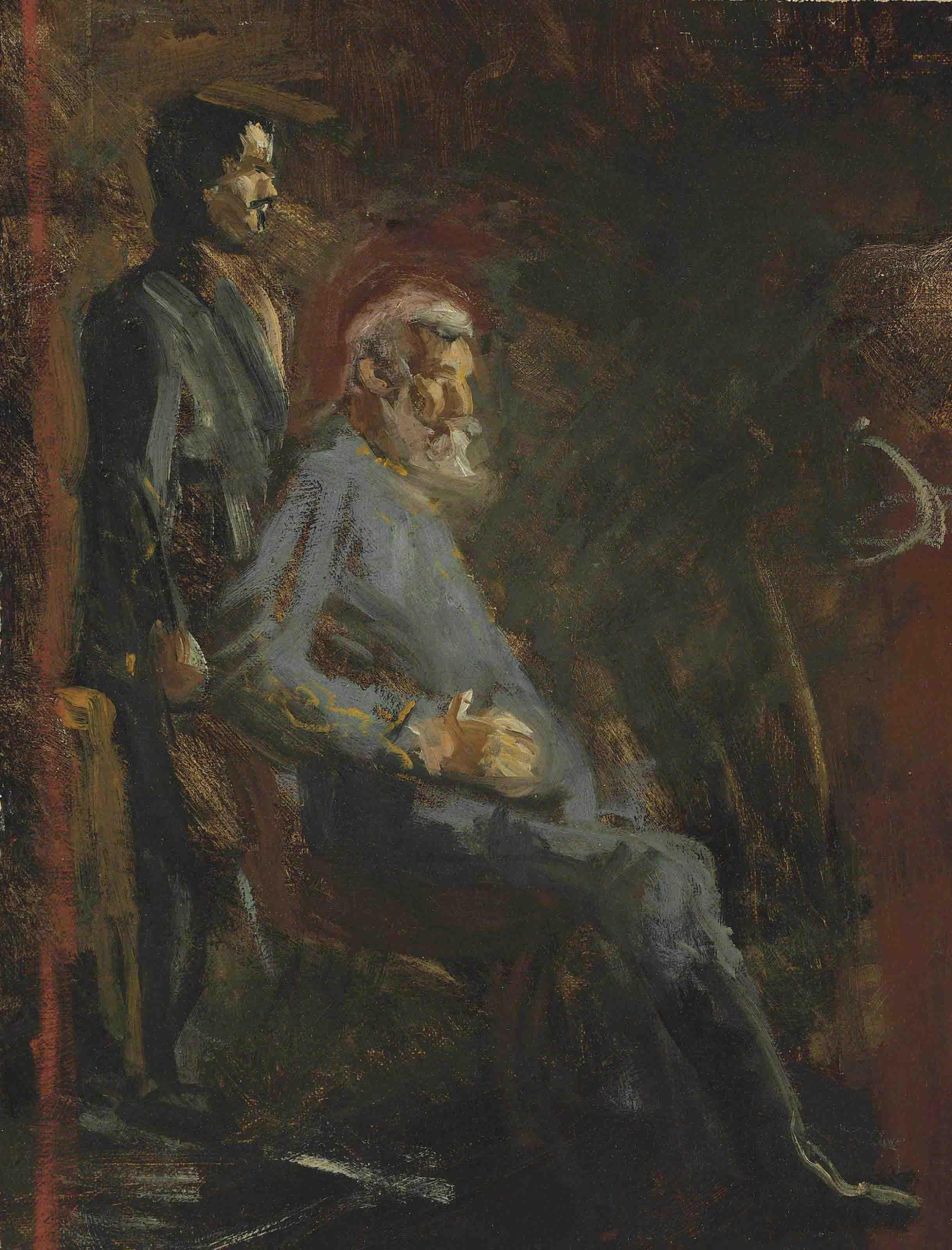
Sketch for The Surrender of General Lee at Appomattox (c. 1875), deaccessioned from Hirshhorn Museum and Sculpture Garden

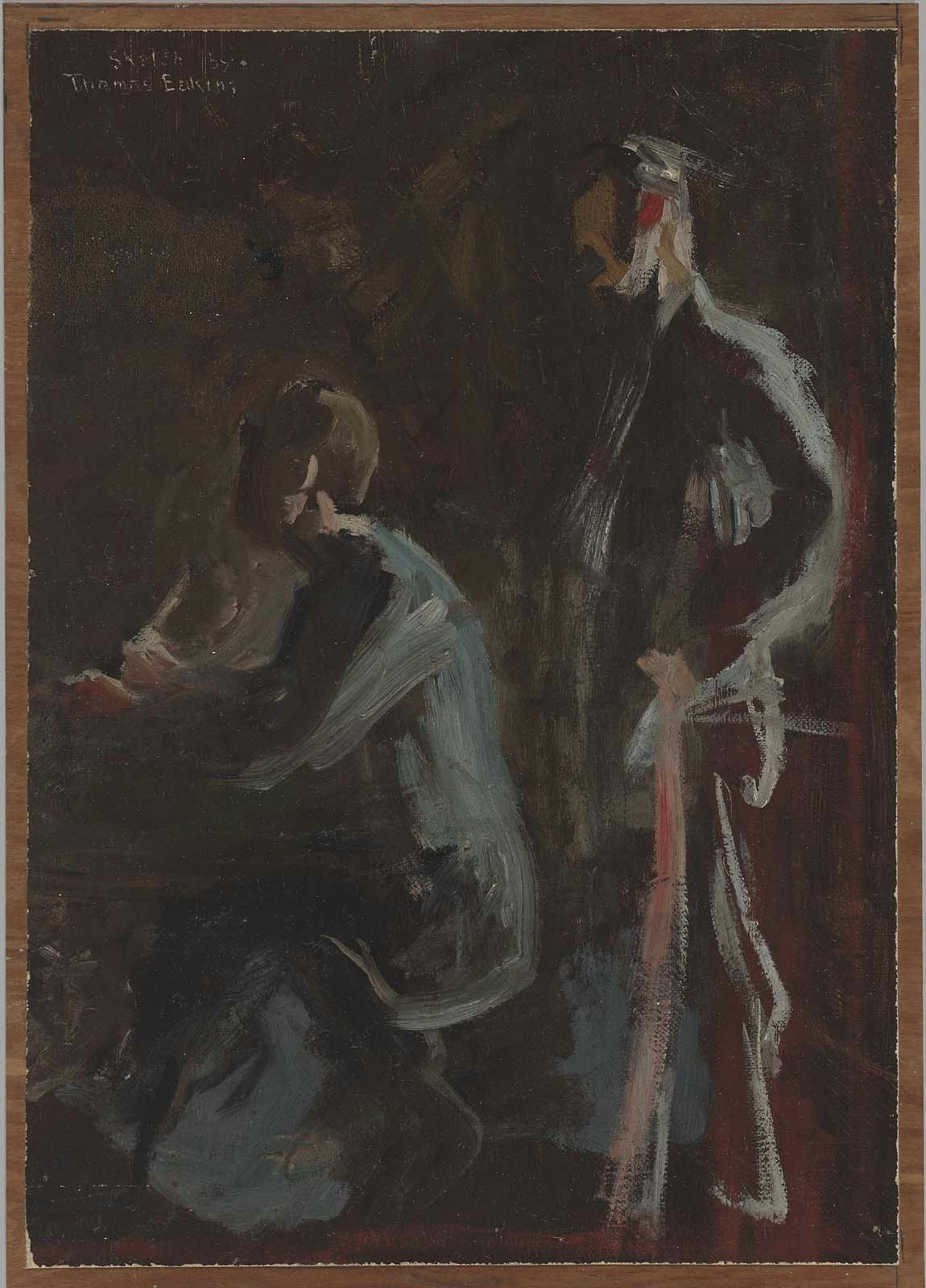
Sketch for The Surrender of General Lee at Appomattox (c. 1875), Museum of Fine Arts, Boston

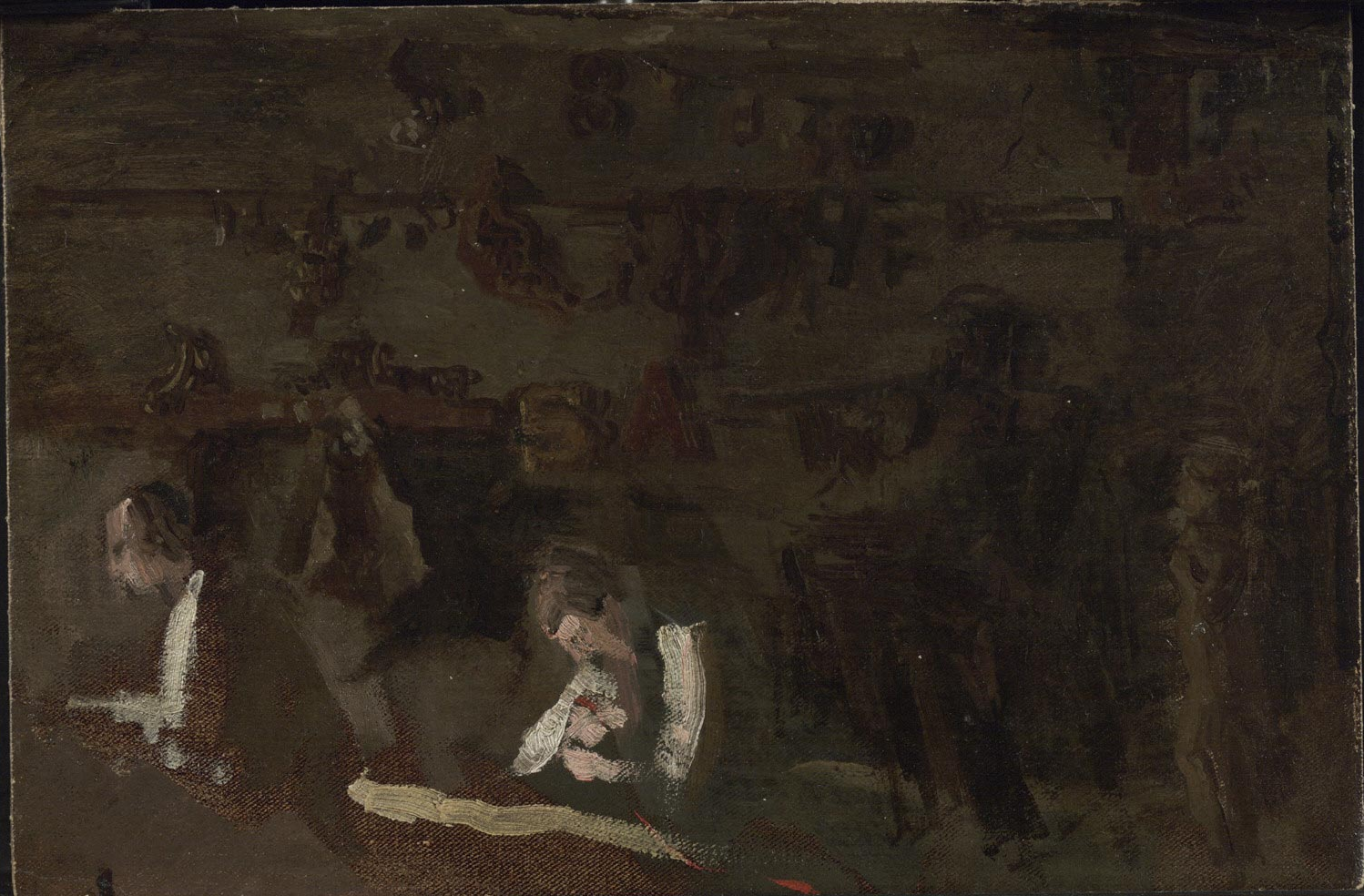
Interior of a Woodcarver's Shop (c. 1876-77), Study for William Rush and His Model, Philadelphia Museum of Art

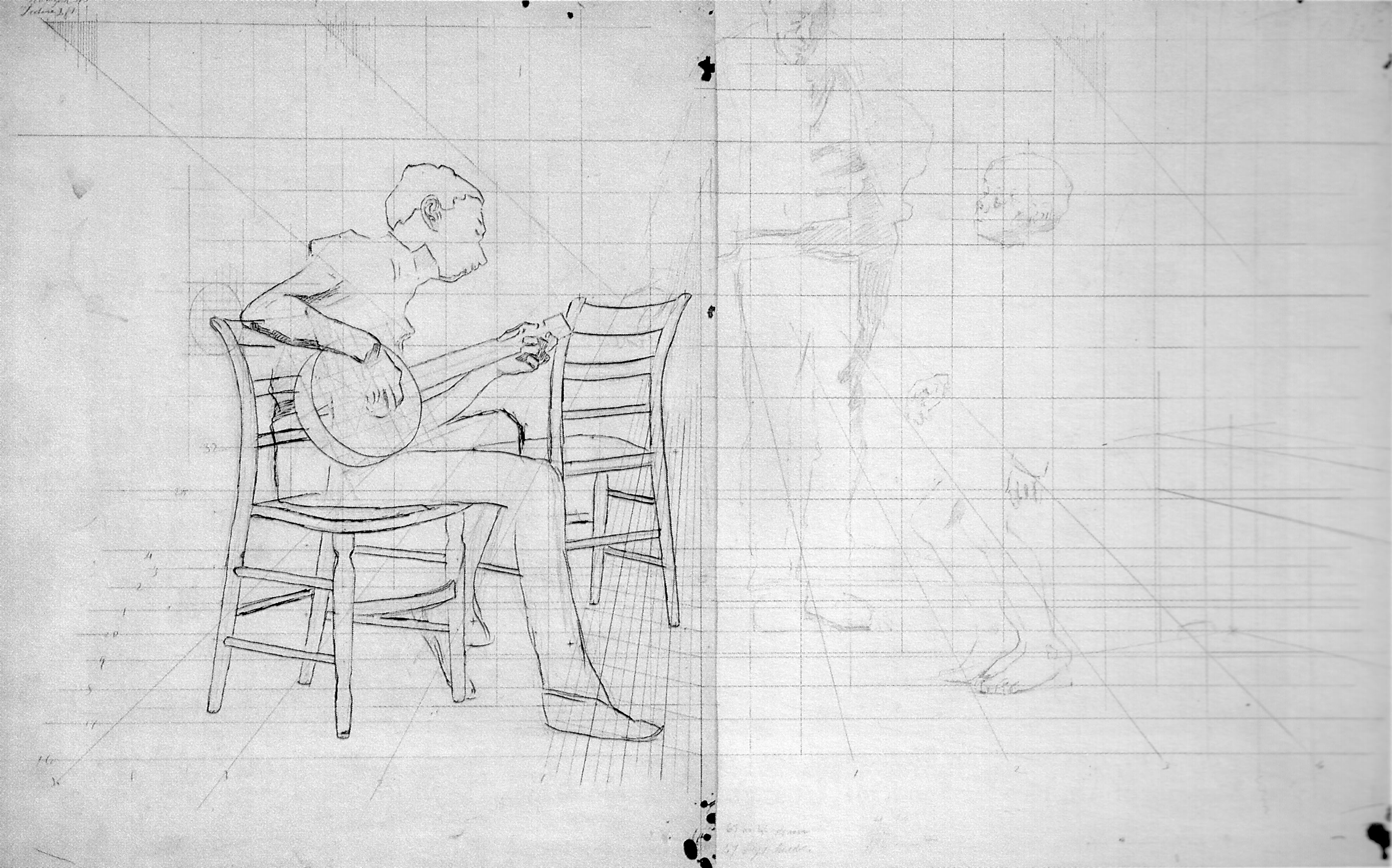
Perspective drawing for The Dancing Lesson (c.1878-79), Pennsylvania Academy of the Fine Arts

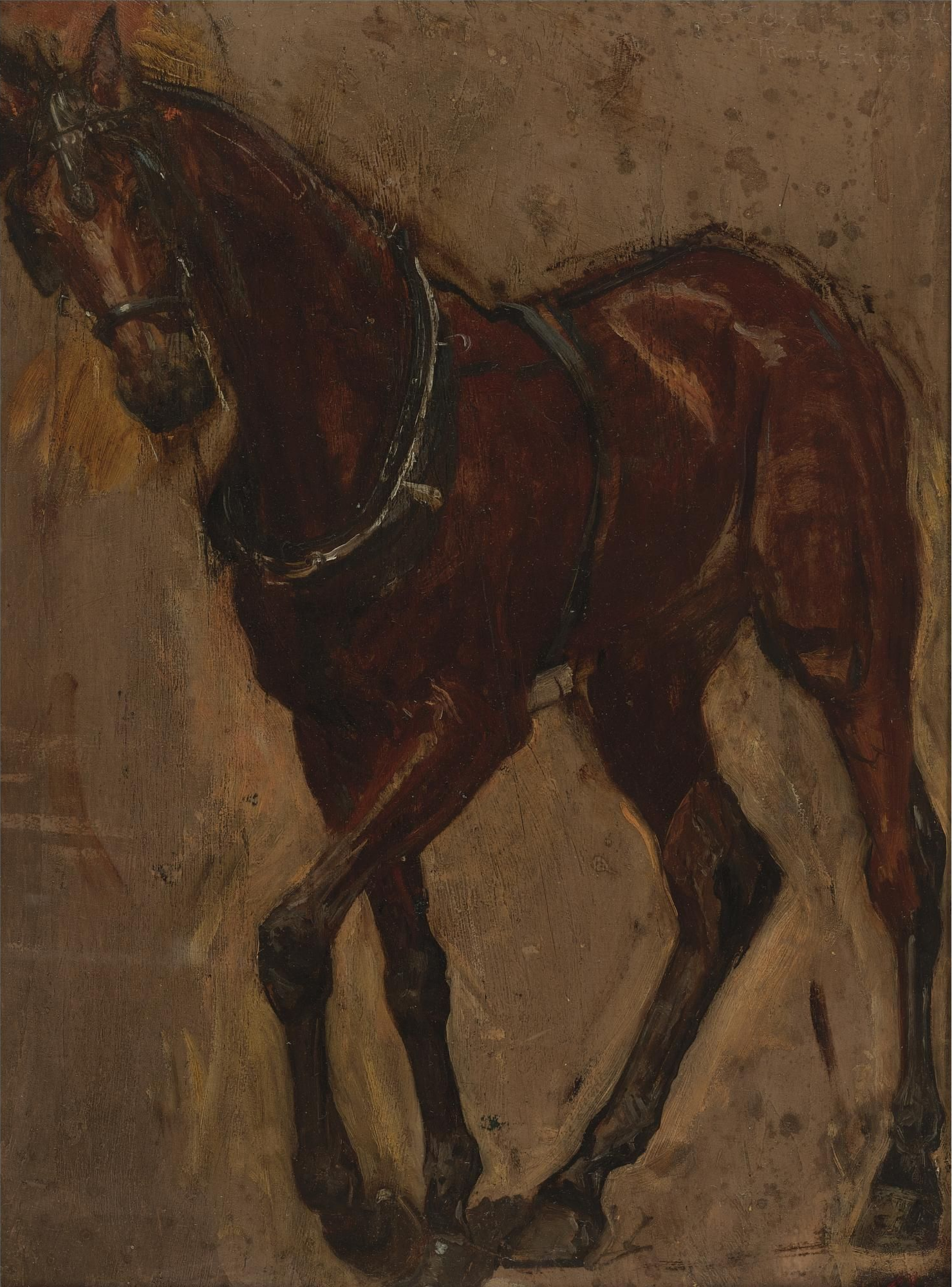
Sketch for The Fairman Rogers Four-in-Hand (c. 1879), deaccessioned from Hirshhorn Museum and Sculpture Garden

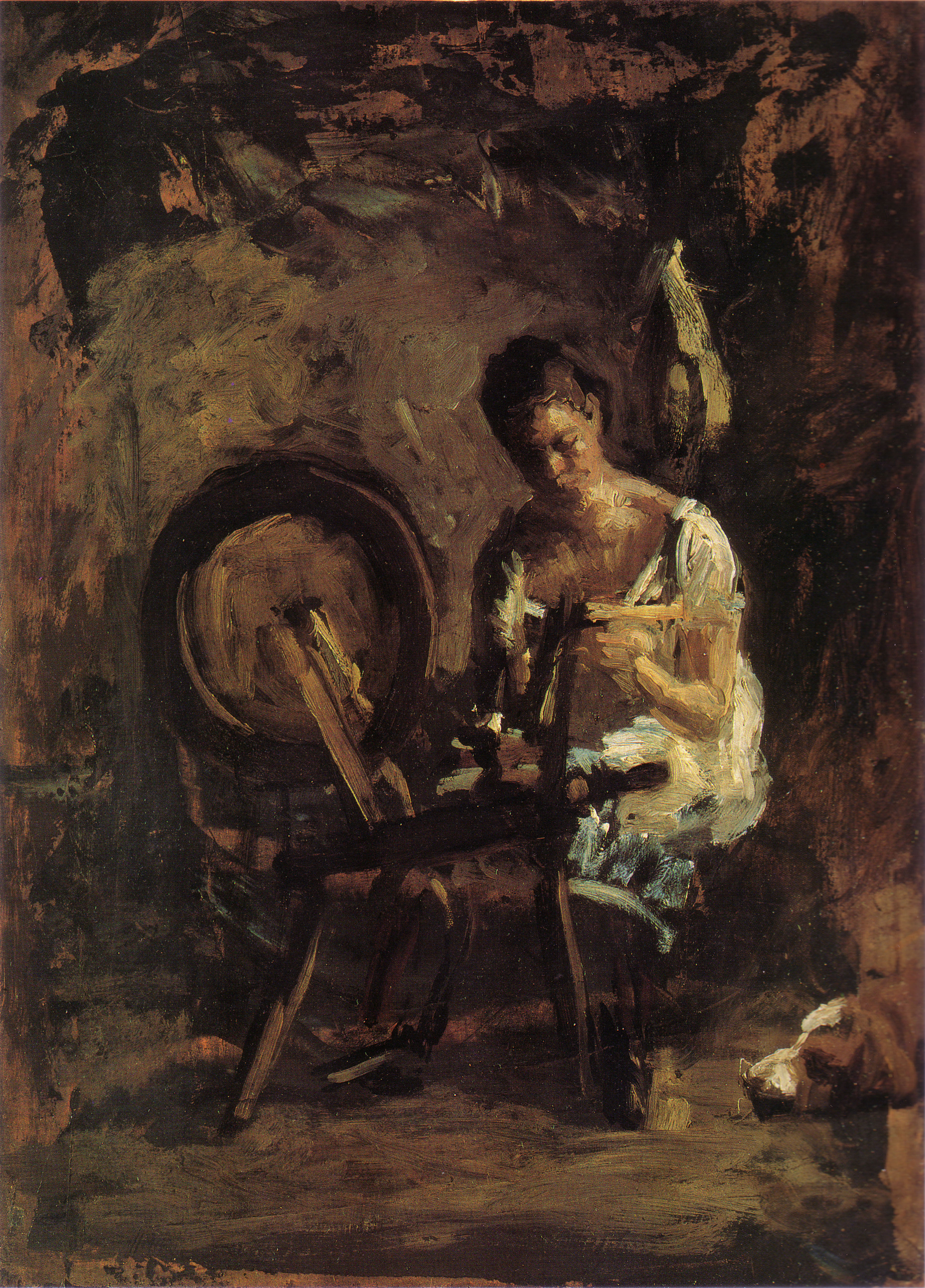
Sketch for Spinning (1881), Pennsylvania Academy of the Fine Arts

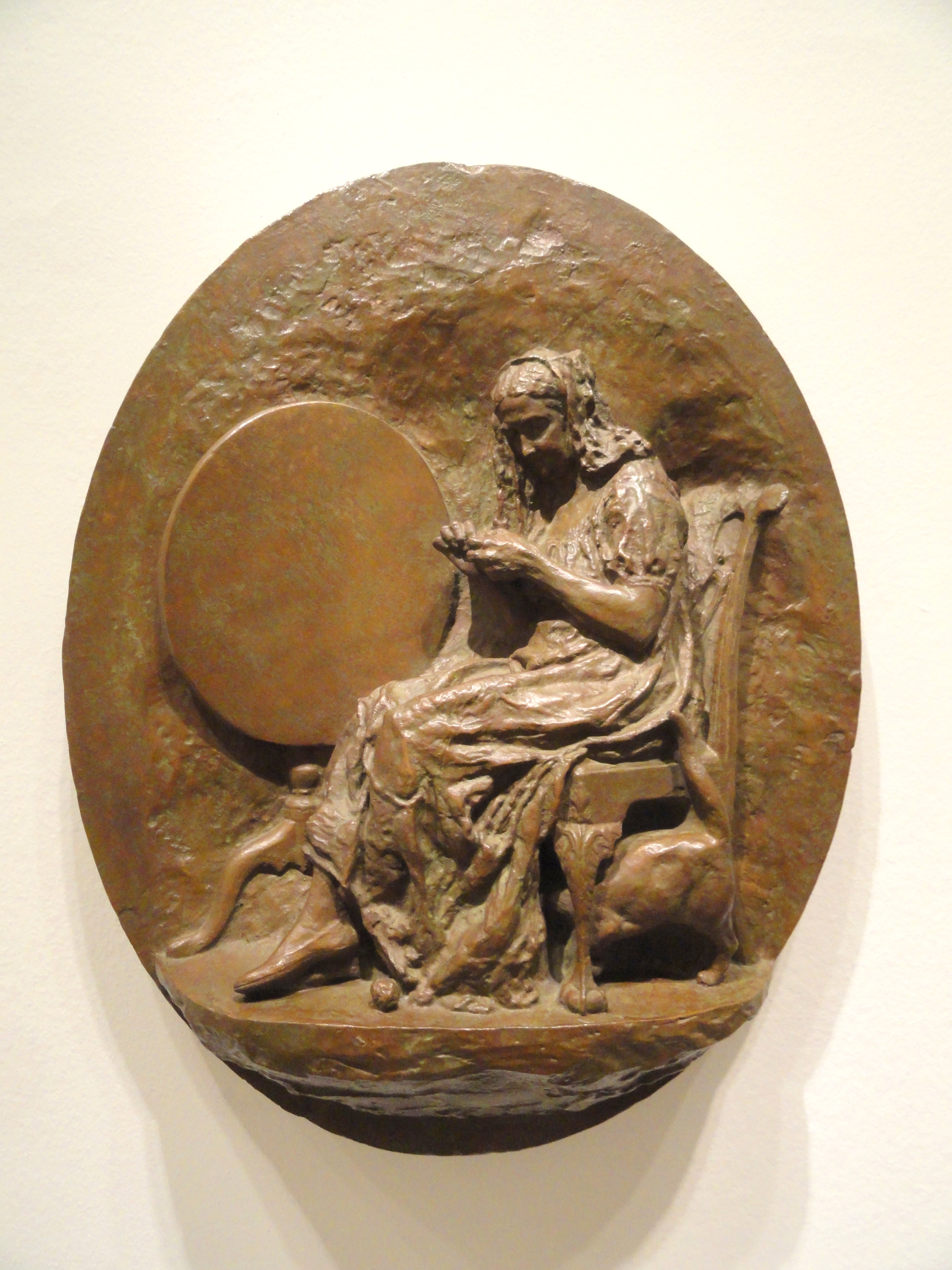
Knitting (1881) painted plaster bas relief, private collection

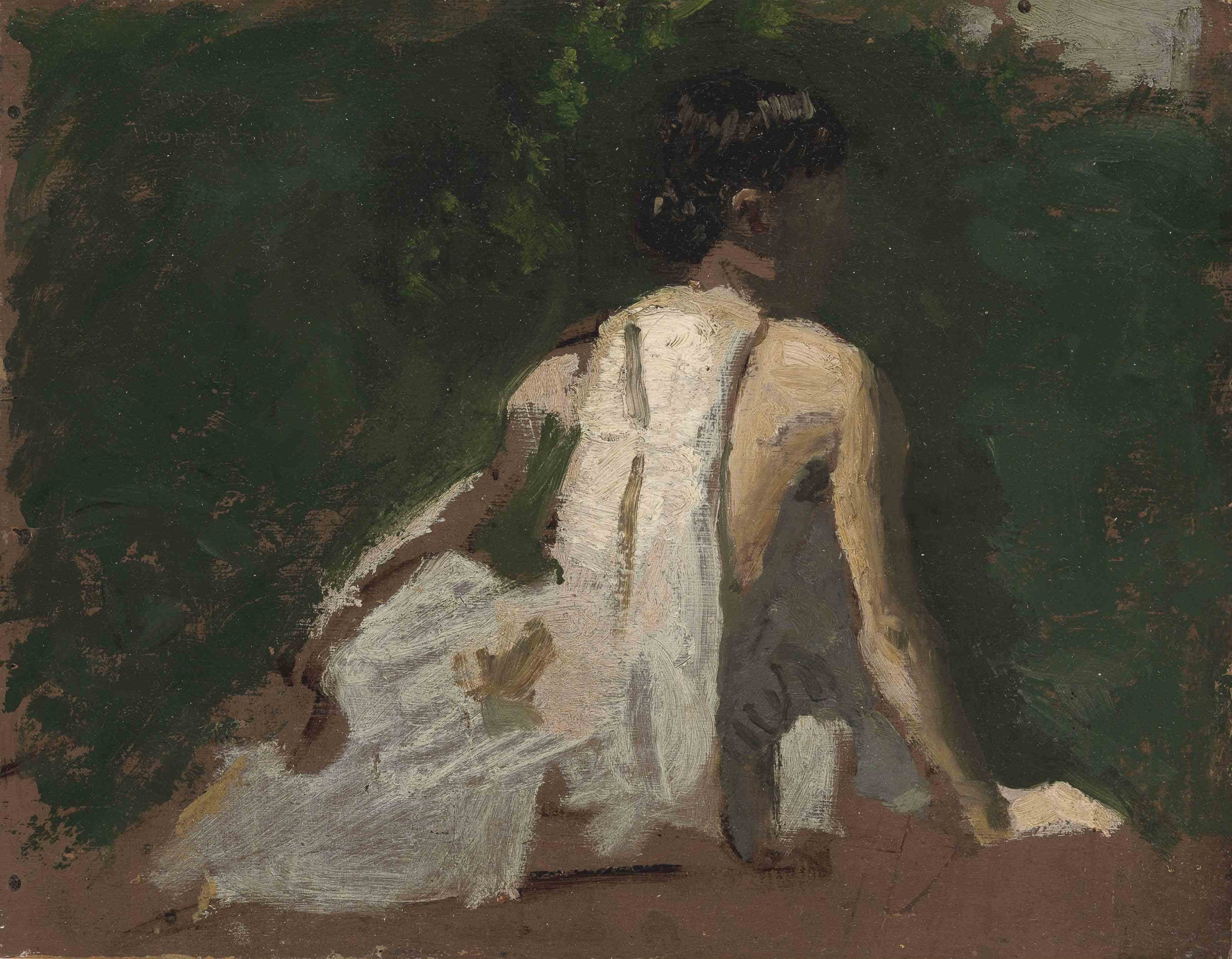
Study for An Arcadian (c.1883), oil on wood panel, deaccessioned from Hirshhorn Museum and Sculpture Garden

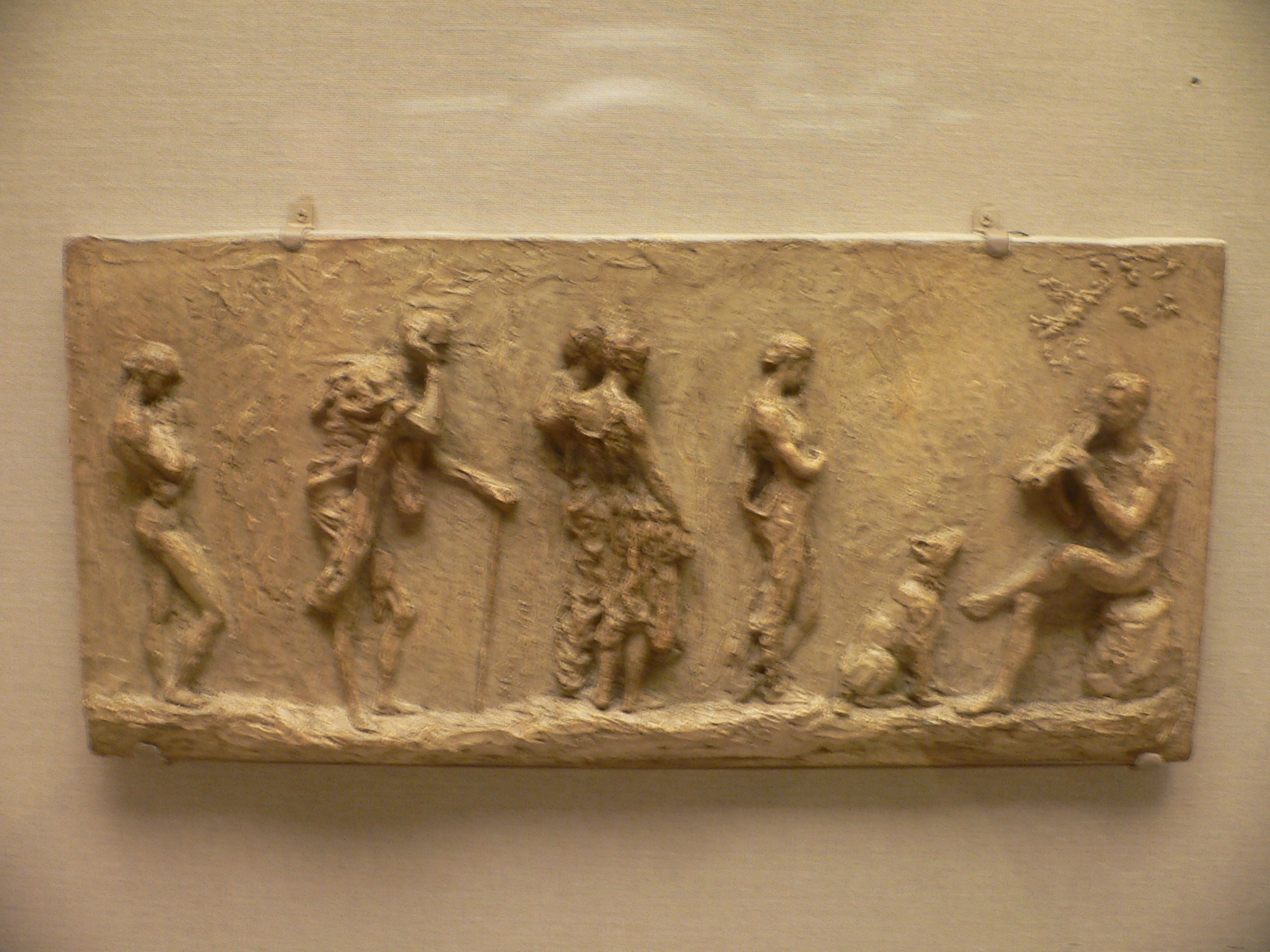
Arcadia (1883), painted plaster bas relief, Hirshhorn Museum and Sculpture Garden

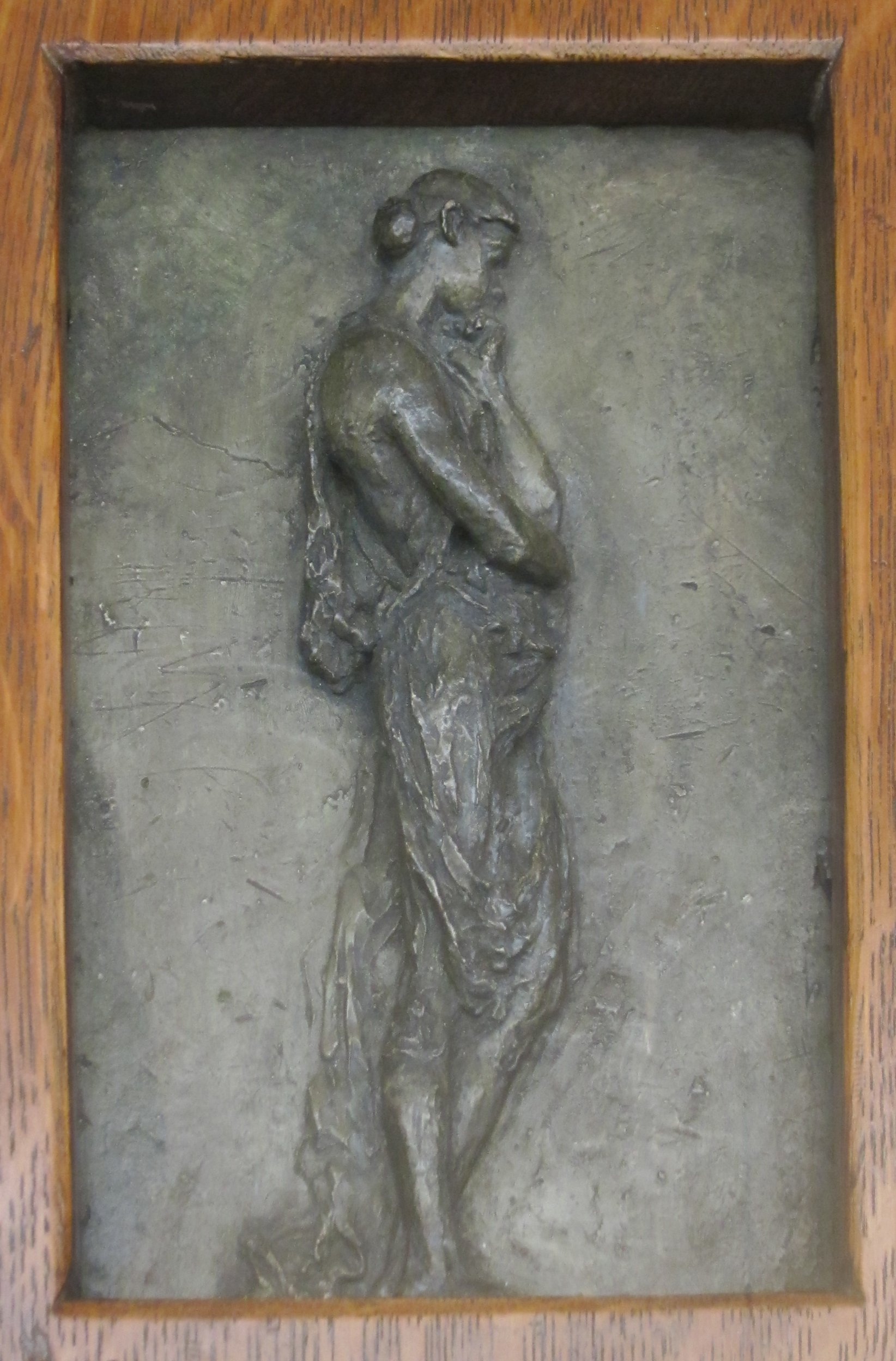
An Arcadian (1883) painted plaster bas relief, Pennsylvania Academy of the Fine Arts

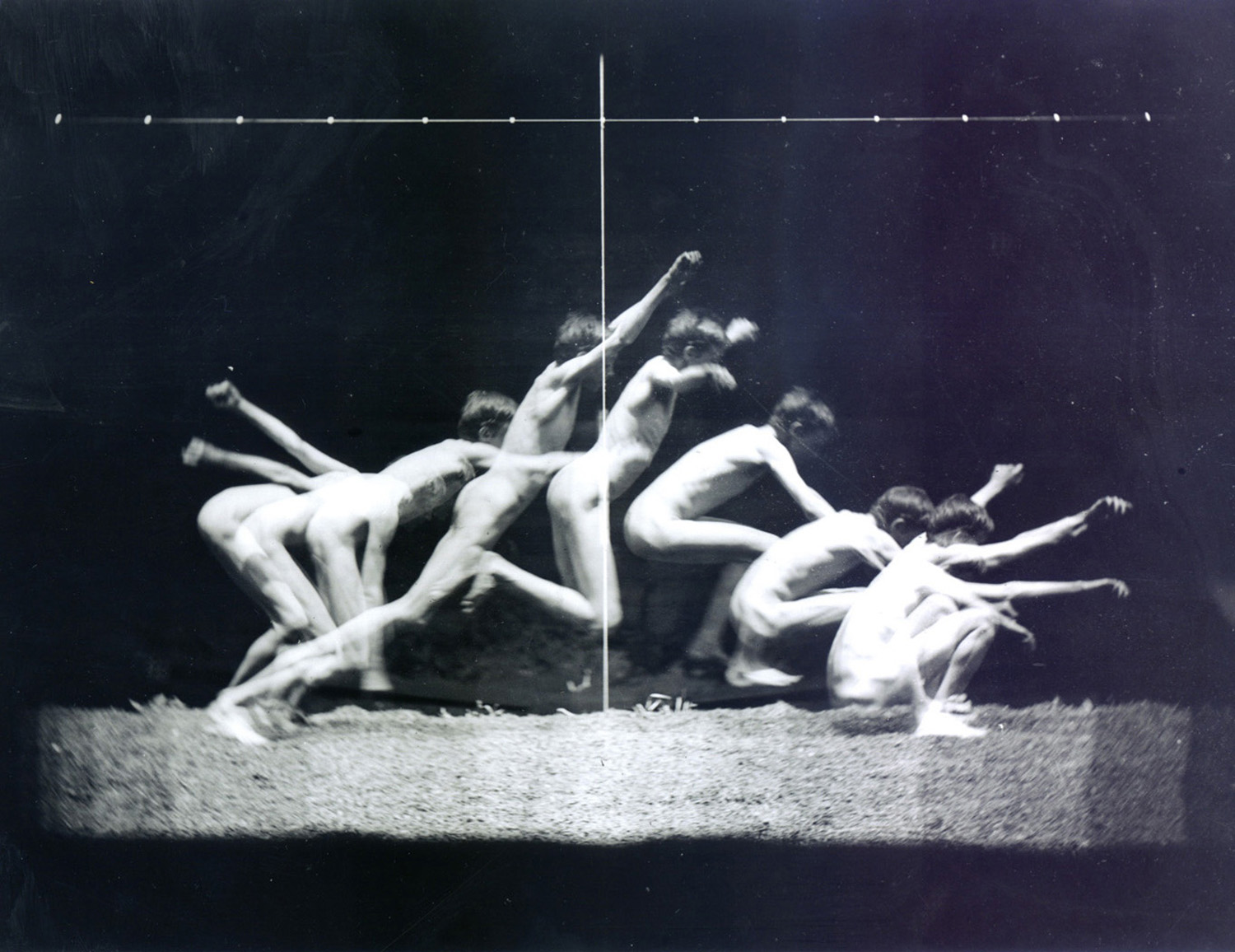
"History of a Jump" (1884) Marey wheel photograph, Philadelphia Museum of Art

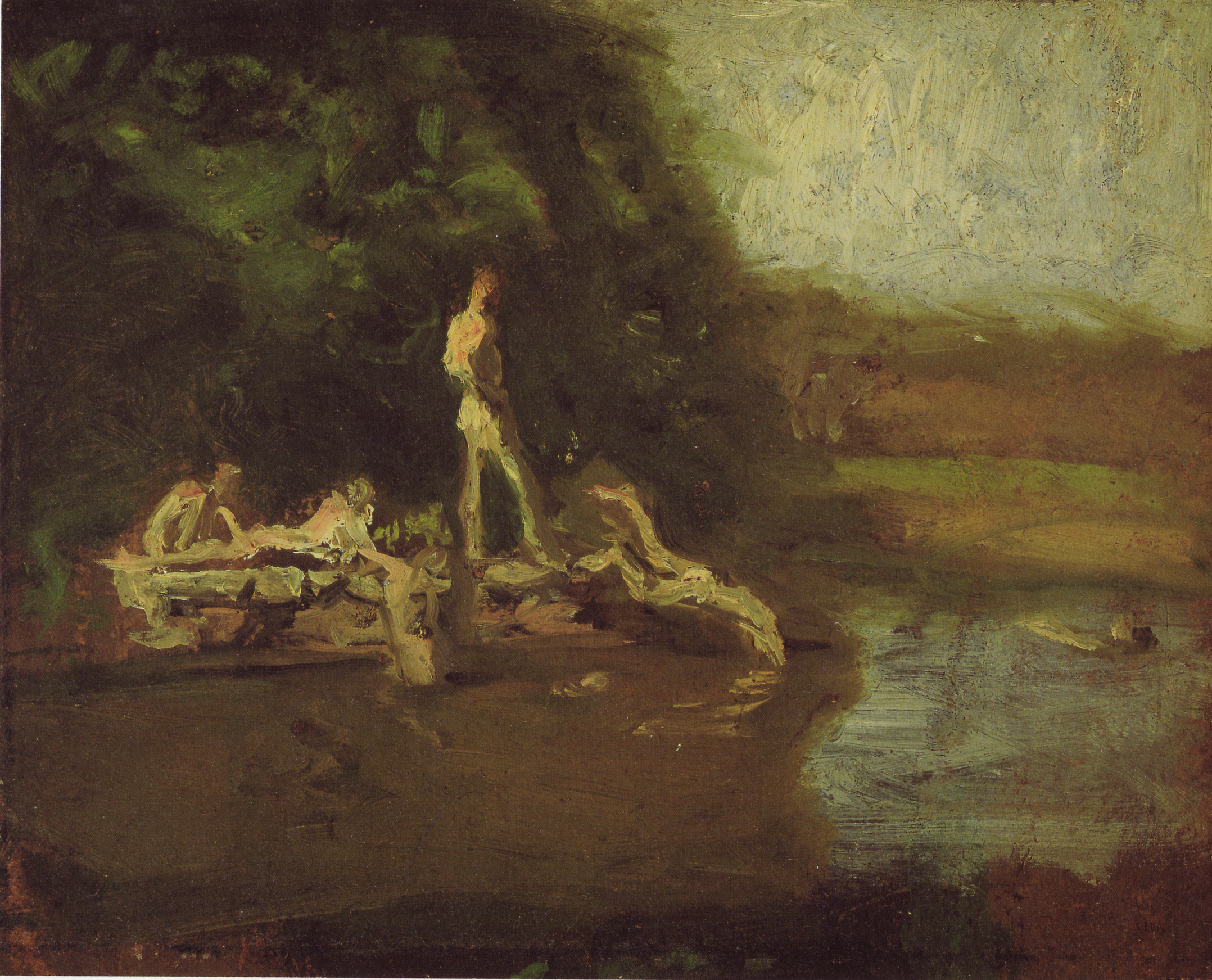
Sketch for The Swimming Hole (1884), Hirshhorn Museum and Sculpture Garden

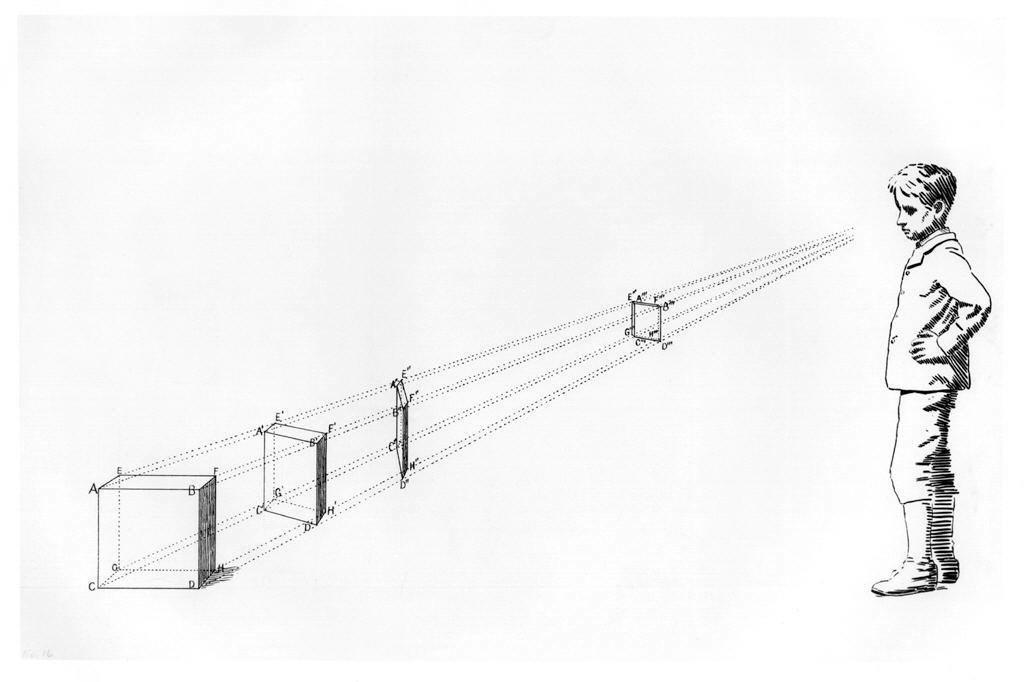
Illustration for The Law of Perspective (c. 1884-87), Hirshhorn Museum and Sculpture Garden

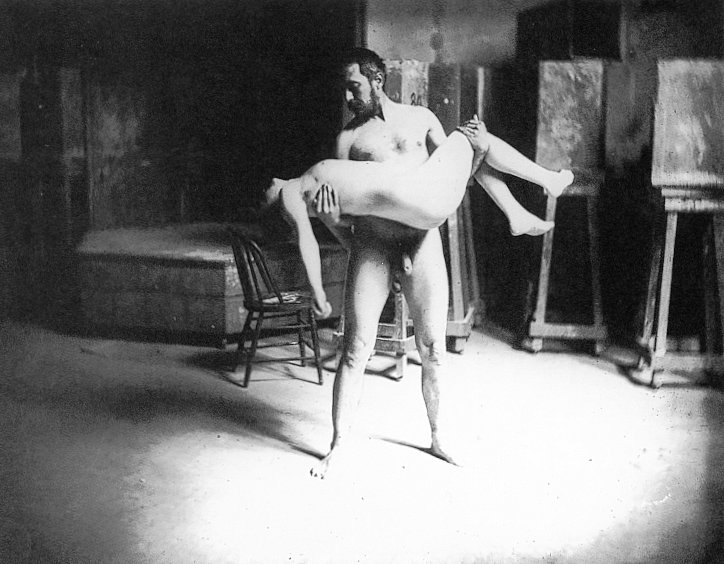
"Thomas Eakins nude, holding a nude female in his arms, looking down" (c. 1885), Pennsylvania Academy of the Fine Arts

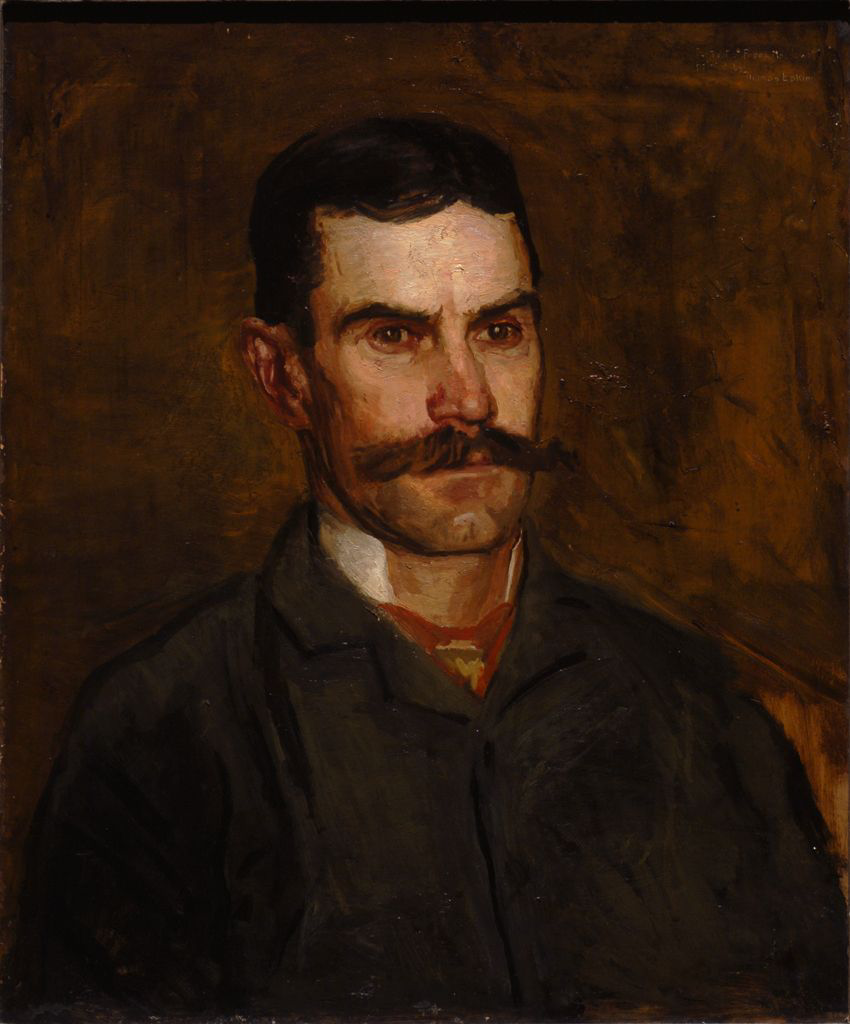
Portrait of Frank MacDowell (c. 1886), Hirshhorn Museum and Sculpture Garden

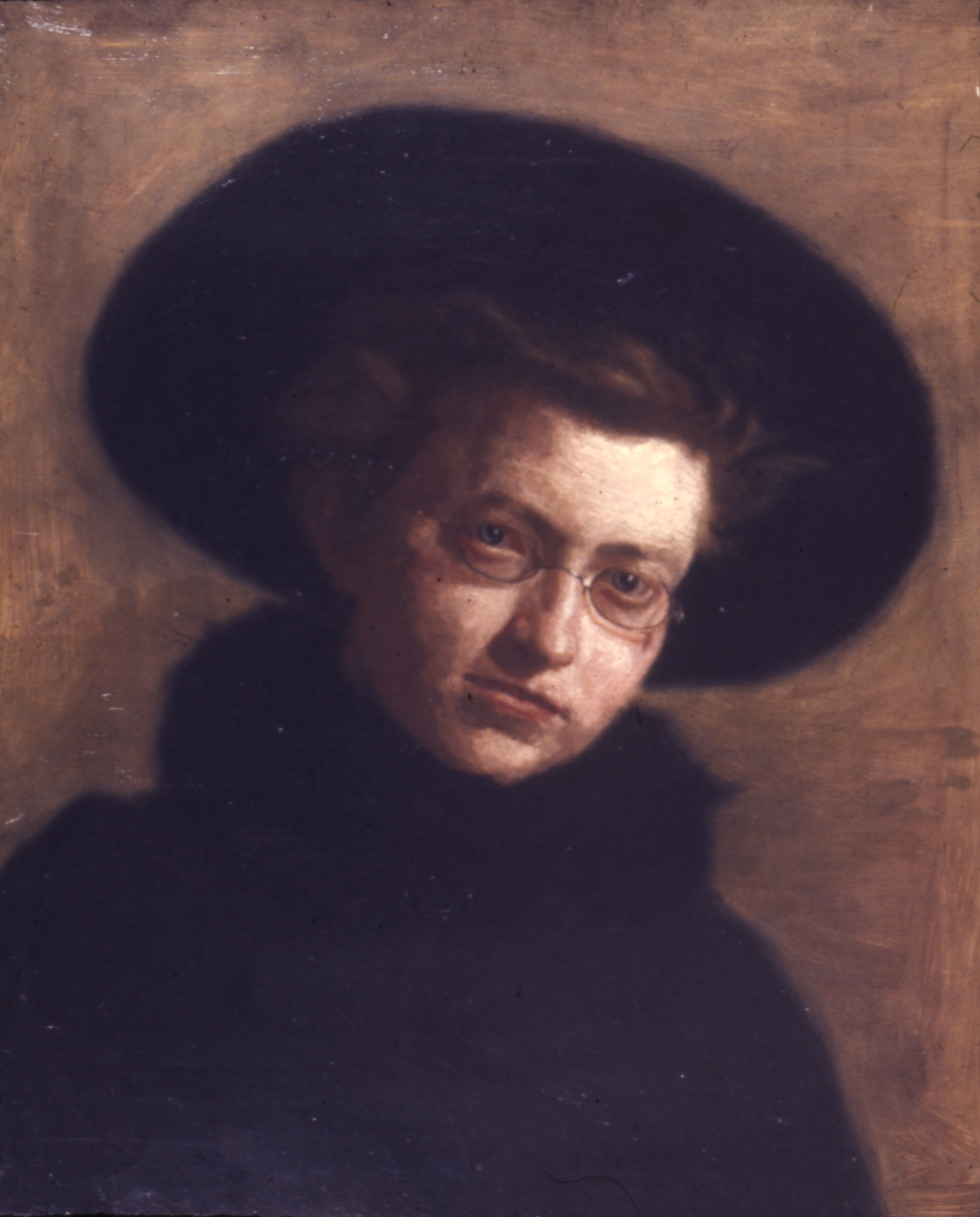
Girl in a Big Hat (1888), Hirshhorn Museum and Sculpture Garden

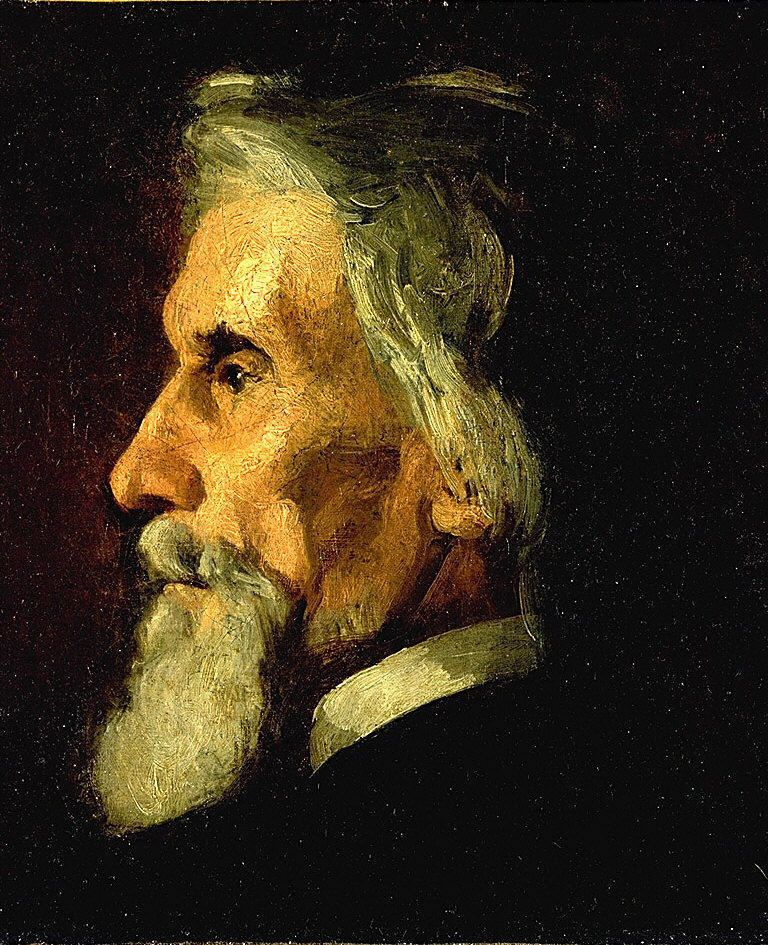
Study for William H. MacDowell (1890), Hirshhorn Museum and Sculpture Garden

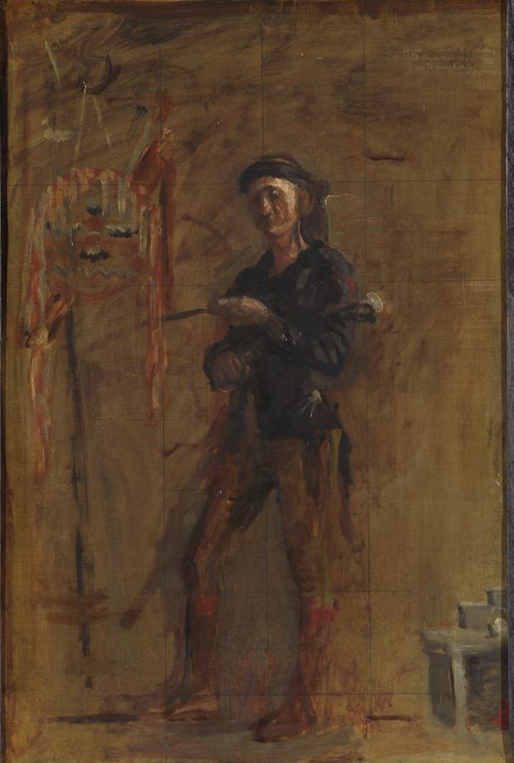
Sketch for Portrait of Frank Hamilton Cushing (1895), Hirshhorn Museum and Sculpture Garden

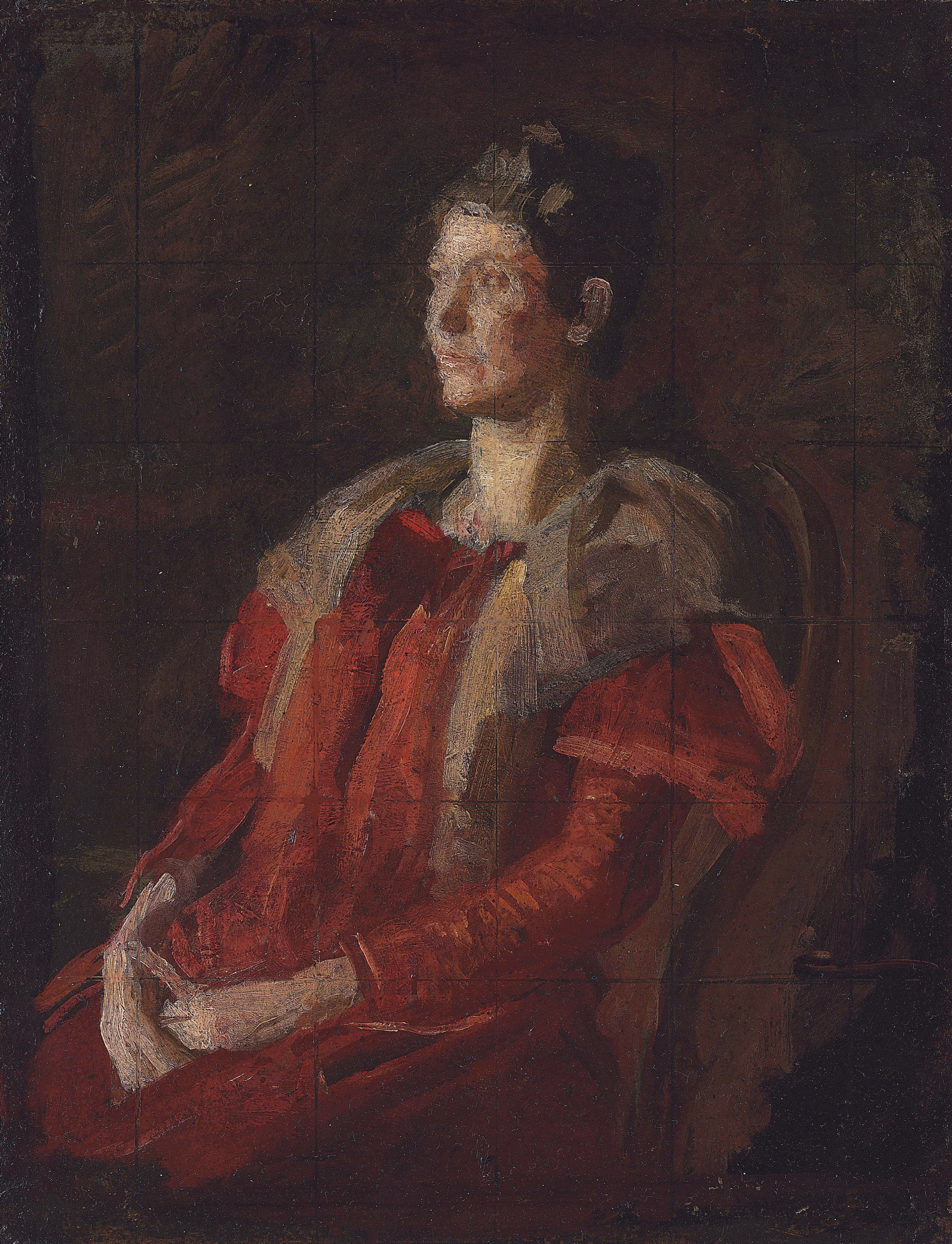
Study for Mrs. Charles L. Leonard (c. 1895), deaccessioned from Hirshhorn Museum and Sculpture Garden

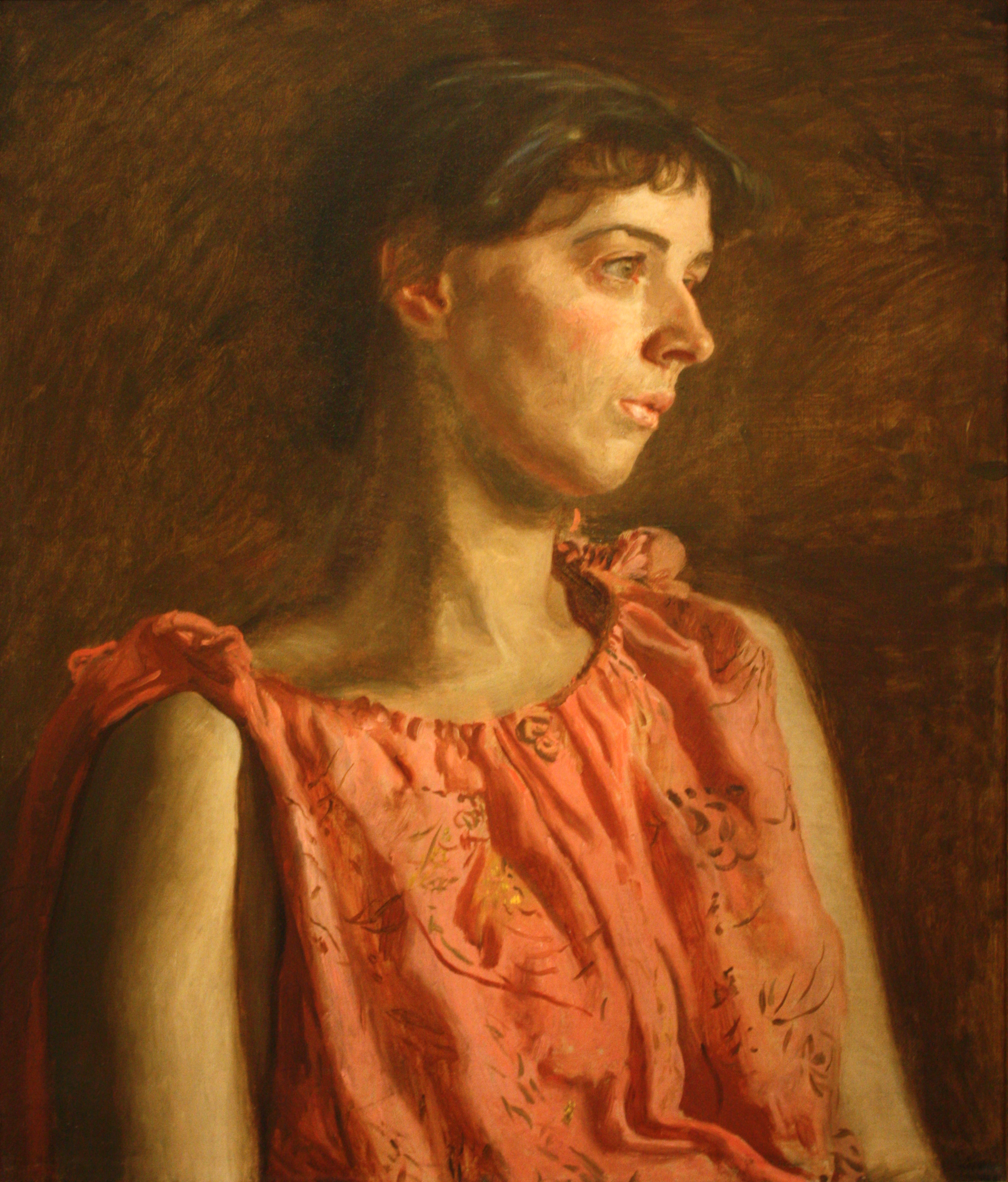
Weda Cook (c.1896), Columbus Museum of Art, Columbus, Ohio.

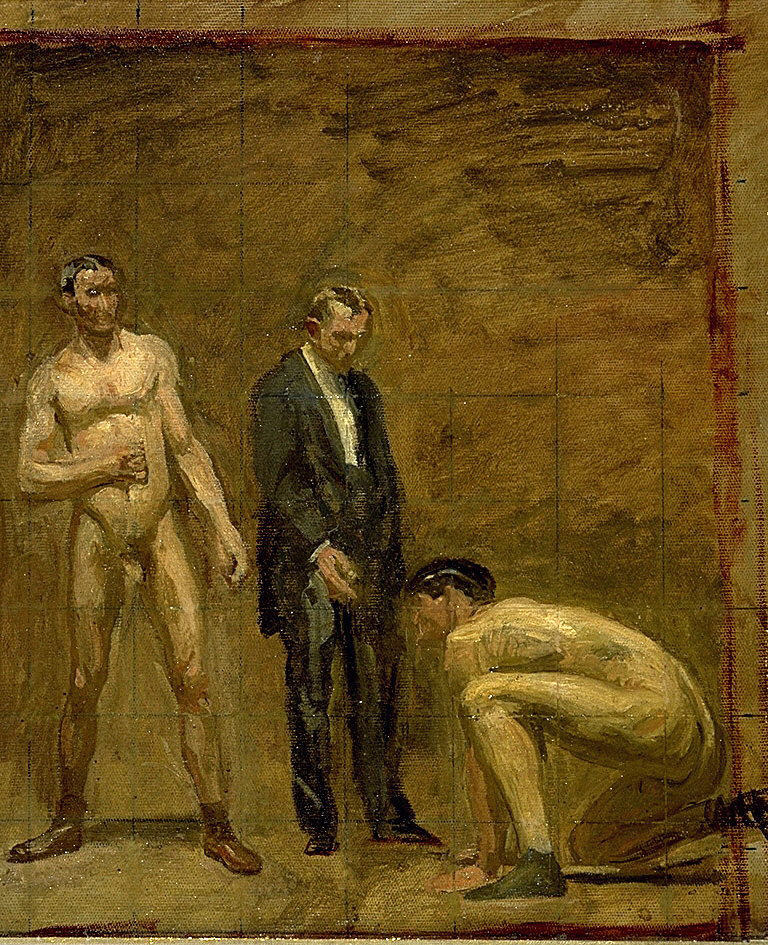
Study for Taking the Count (1898), Hirshhorn Museum and Sculpture Garden

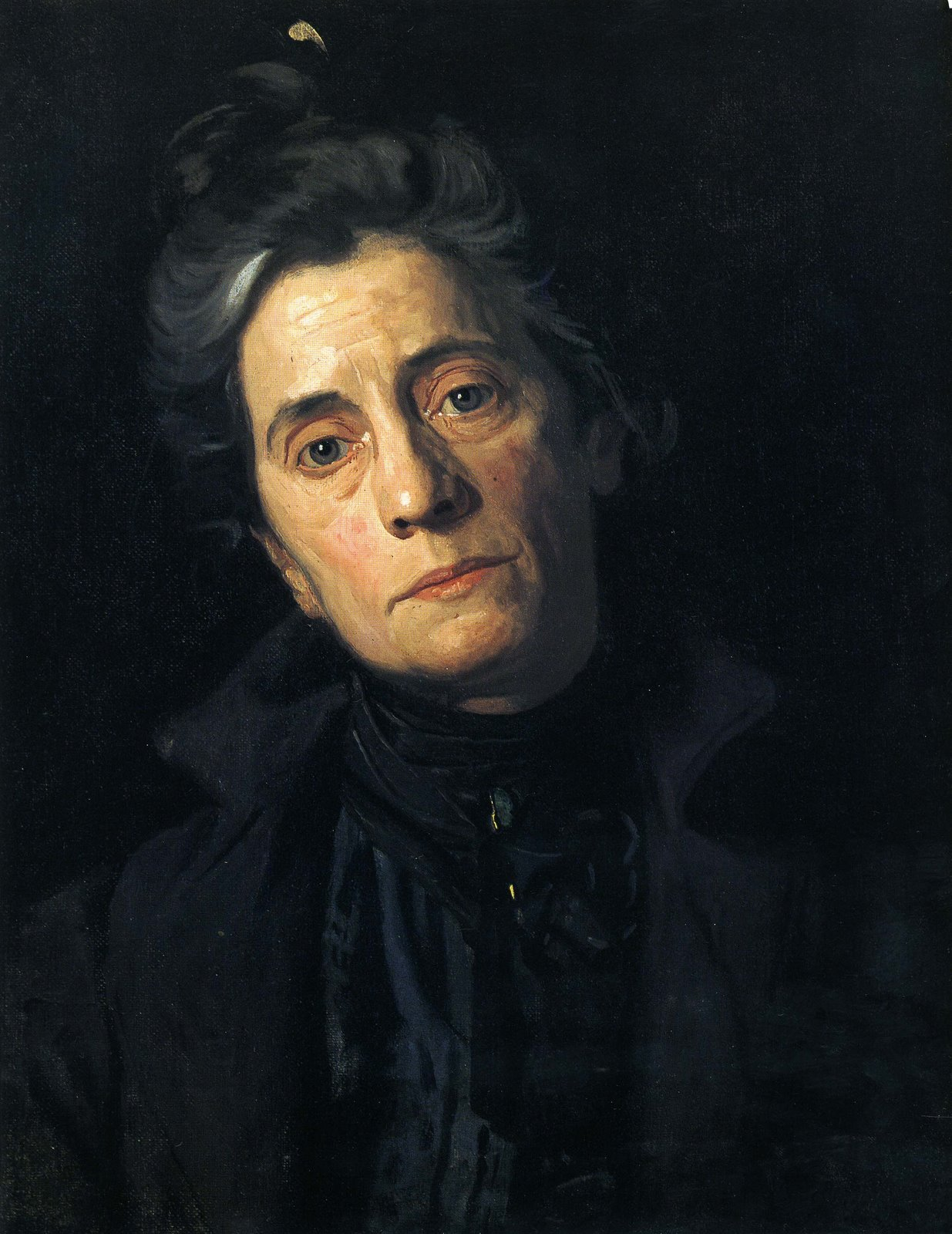
Portrait of Mrs. Eakins (1899), Hirshhorn Museum and Sculpture Garden

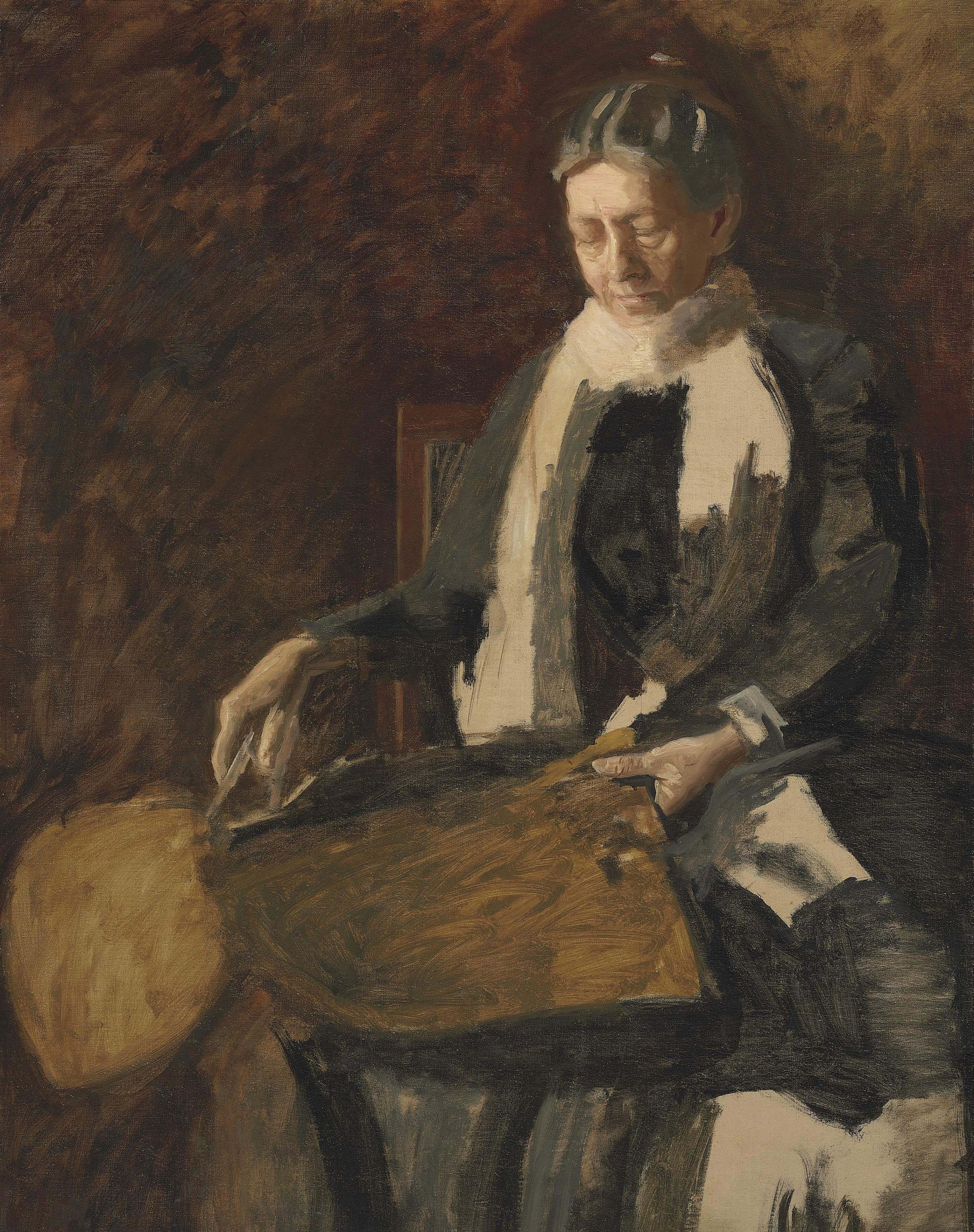
Study for Portrait of Mrs. Joseph H. Drexel (c. 1900), deaccessioned from Hirshhorn Museum and Sculpture Garden

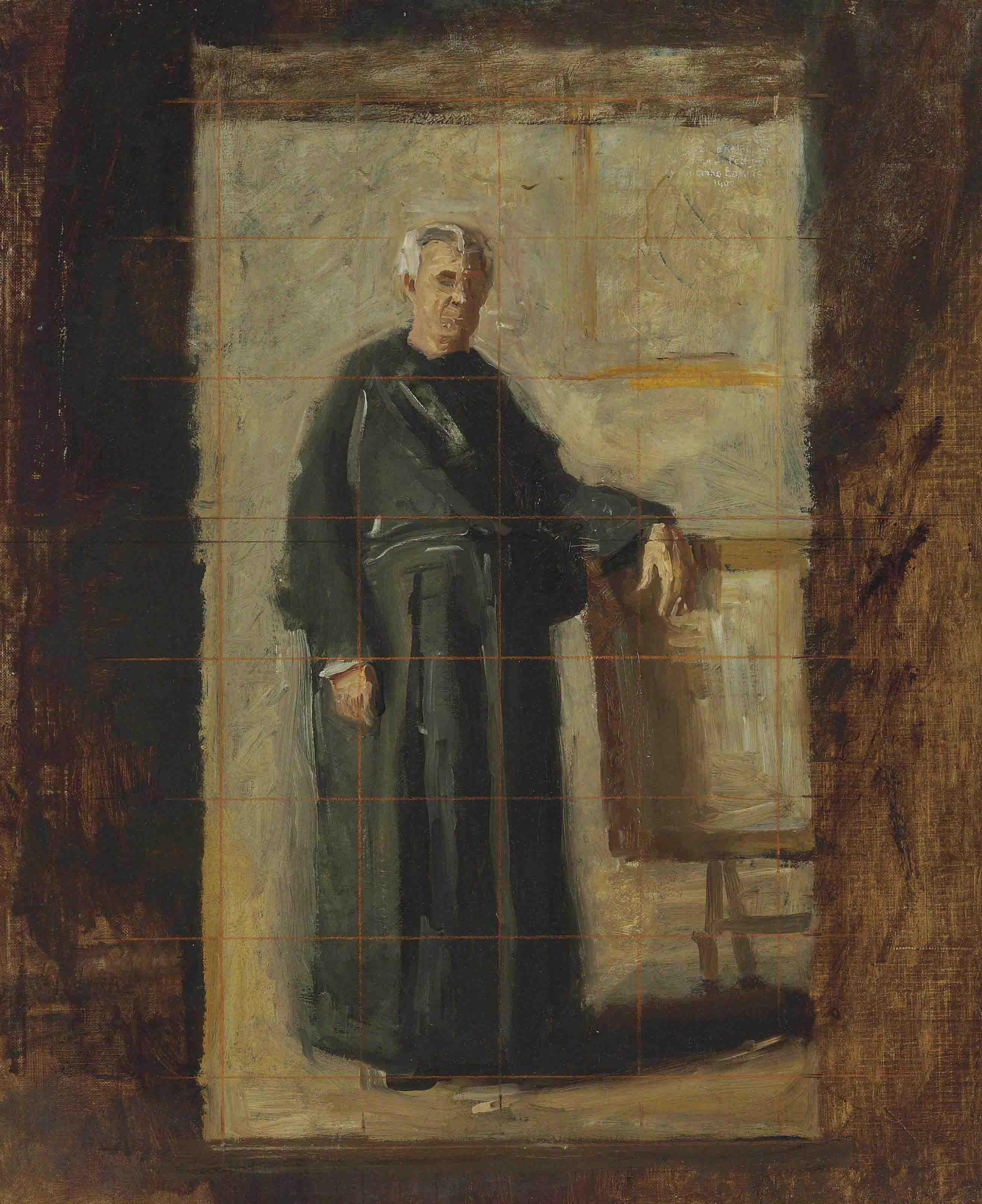
Study for Rev. John J. Fedigan (c. 1902), Hirshhorn Museum and Sculpture Garden

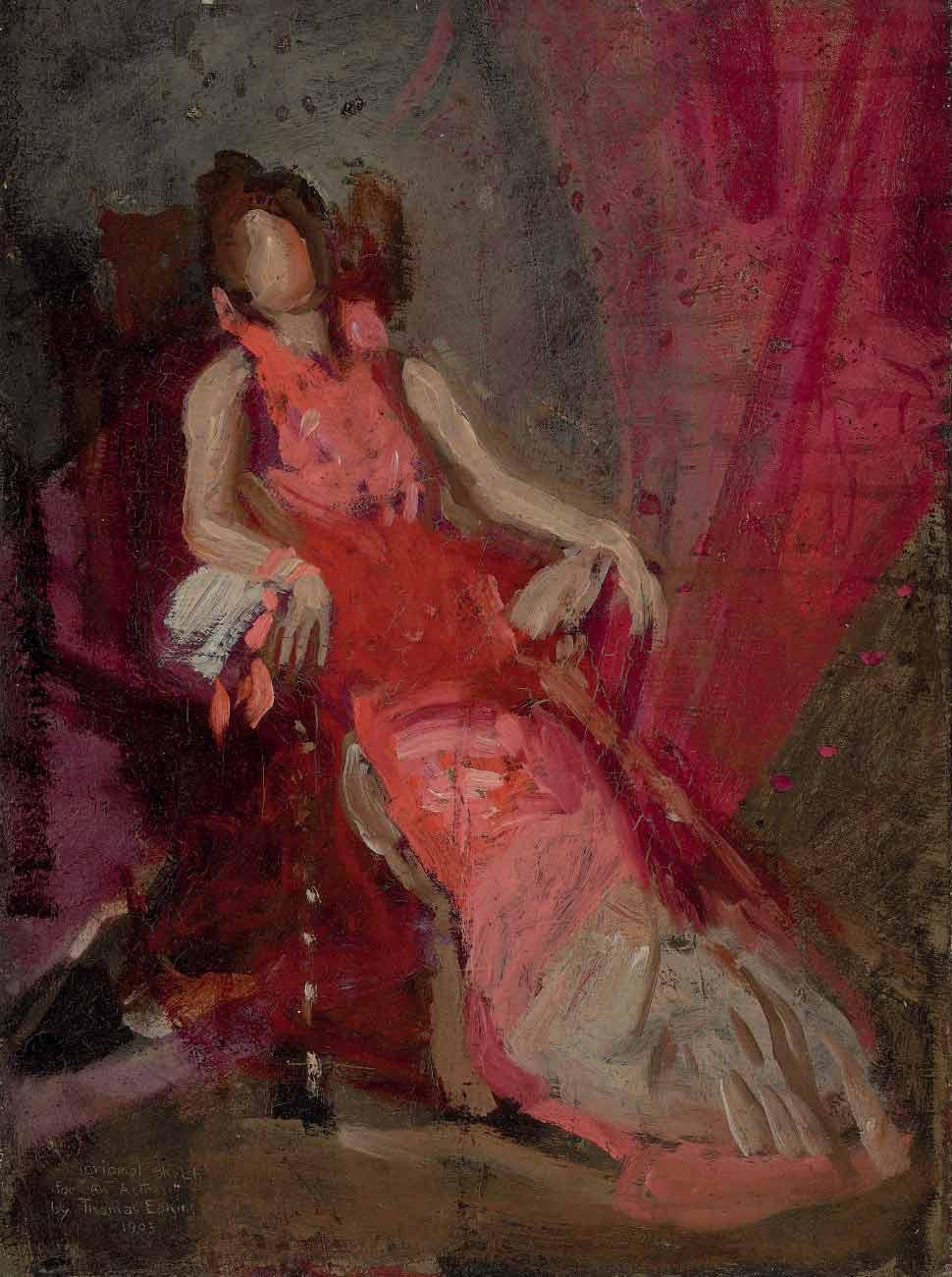
Study for An Actress (1903), deaccessioned from Hirshhorn Museum and Sculpture Garden

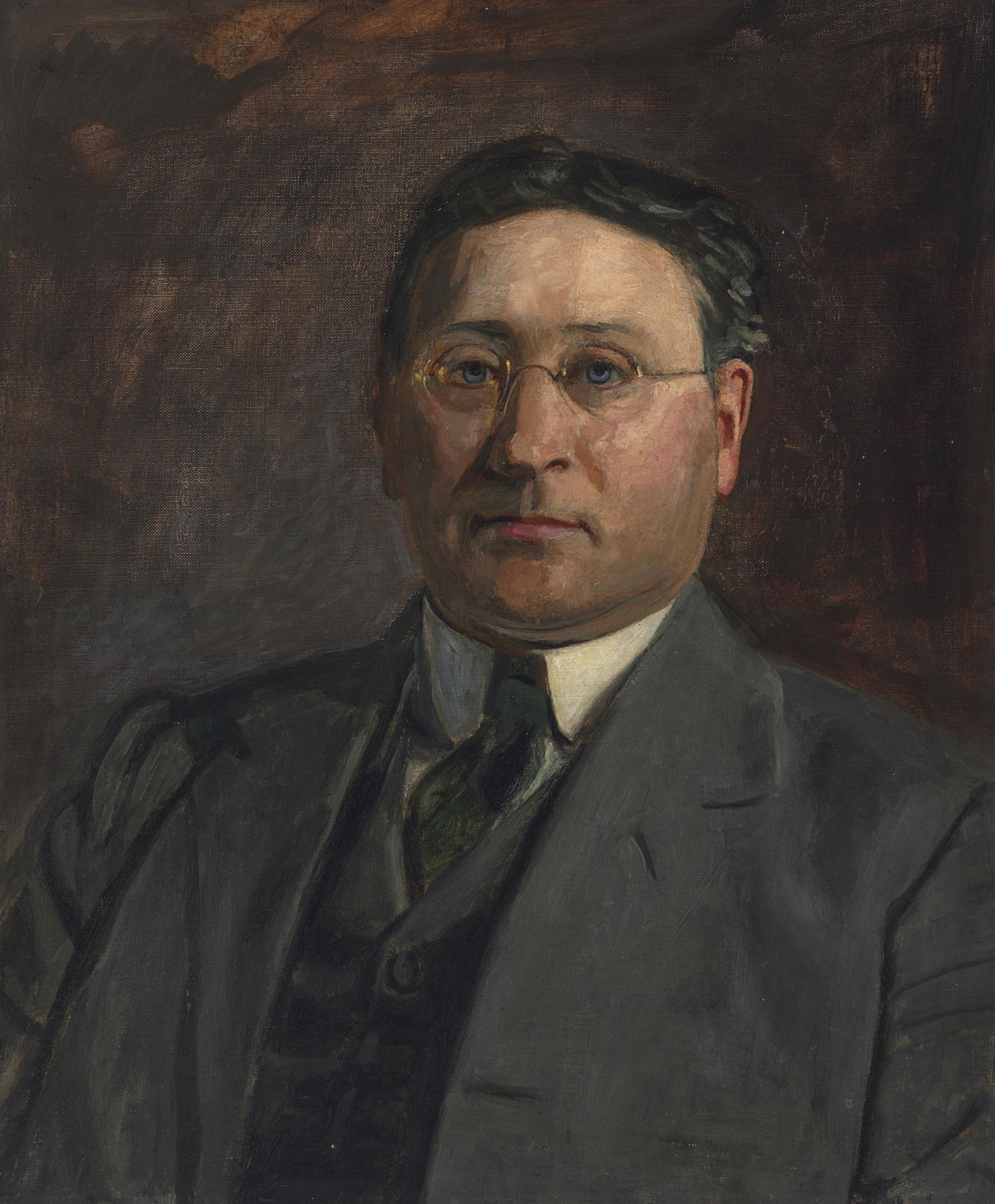
Portrait of Maurice Feely (c. 1905), deaccessioned from Hirshhorn Museum and Sculpture Garden

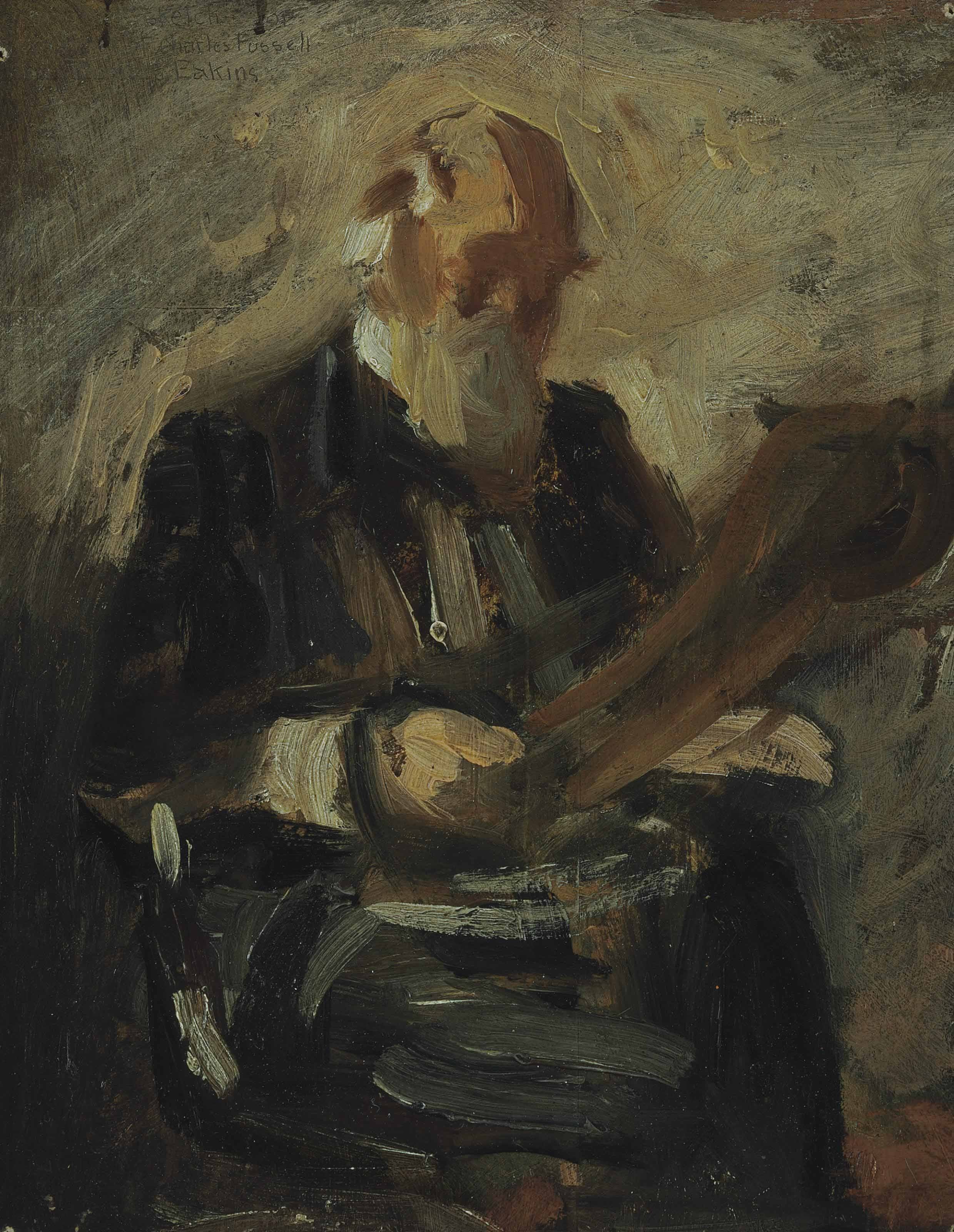
Study for Portrait of Charles Fussell (c. 1906), deaccessioned from Hirshhorn Museum and Sculpture Garden

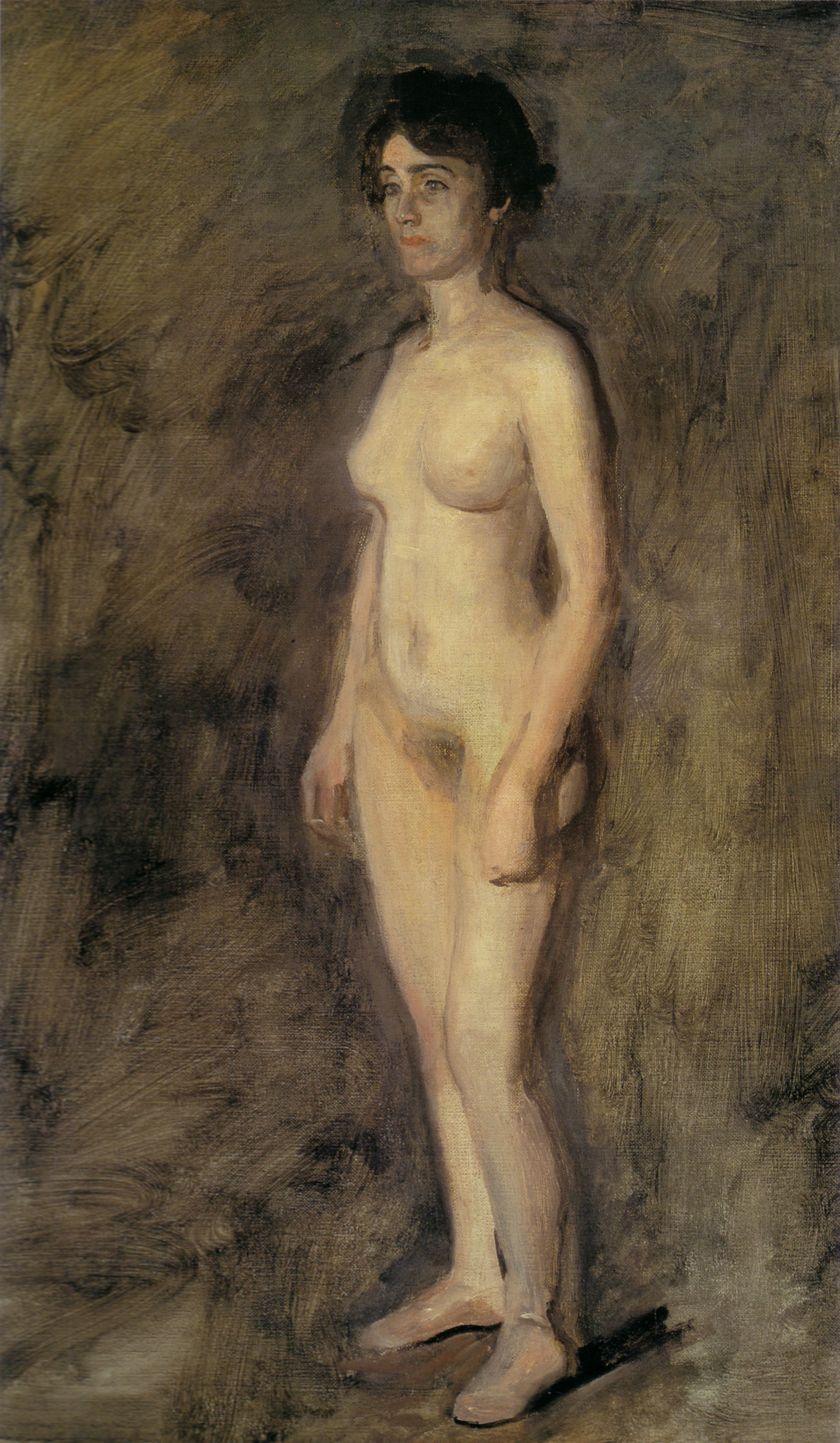
Nude Woman Standing (c. 1908), deaccessioned from Hirshhorn Museum and Sculpture Garden
