= Dorrie K. Fontaine =

American educator, author, nurse

- Born: Charlottesville, Virginia, U.S.
- Citizenship: United States of America
- Education: Bachelor's degree in nursing; PhD
- Alma mater: Villanova University; University of Maryland; Catholic University of America
- Occupations: Educator; Author; Critical care nurse
- Known for: Academic leadership at the University of Virginia School of Nursing
- Awards: Healthy Work Environment Award (2019); Elizabeth Zintl Leadership Award (2019); Capstone International Nursing Book Award (2013); AACN Pioneering Spirit Award; University of Maryland's Visionary Pioneer Award

Dorrie K. Fontaine is an American educator, author, dean, and critical care nurse. She is known best for her academic leadership at the University of Virginia School of Nursing.

== Biography ==
Fontaine was born and raised in Charlottesville. She earned a bachelor's degree in nursing from Villanova University in 1972, a master's degree from the University of Maryland in 1977, and subsequently began her career in academia before receiving a PhD from the Catholic University of America.

Fontaine served as the fifth dean of the University of Virginia School of Nursing (UVA) for over a decade before retiring in July 2018. While at UVA, she created the Compassionate Care Initiative to help train nurses on providing empathetic care to patients and implemented requirements of interprofessional education among medical and nursing students through course material and training exercises. Fontaine is a past president and member of the American Association of Critical-Care Nurses and has been a fellow of the American Academy of Nursing for over 20 years.

== Bibliography ==
- Morton, Patricia; Fontaine, Dorrie; Hudak, Carolyn; Gallo, Barbara (2005). Critical Care Nursing: A Holistic Approach (8th ed.). Lippincott Williams & Wilkins. ISBN 9780781727594.
- Morton, Patricia; Fontaine, Dorrie (2012). Essentials of Critical Care Nursing: A Holistic Approach. Lippincott Williams & Wilkins. ISBN 9781609136932.

== Awards ==
- University of Maryland's Visionary Pioneer Award
- 2019 Elizabeth Zintl Leadership Award
- AACN Pioneering Spirit Award
- Presidential Citation from the Society of Critical Care Medicine
- 2013 Capstone International Nursing Book Award
- 2019 Healthy Work Environment Award
