= The Art of the Steal (2009 film) =

- Theatrical release poster by Neil Kellerhouse and Erik Buckham
- Directed by: Don Argott
- Produced by: Sheena M. Joyce
- Cinematography: Don Argott
- Edited by: Demian Fenton
- Music by: West Dylan Thordson
- Production companies: Maj Productions; 9.14 Pictures
- Distributed by: IFC in Theaters
- Release dates: September 12, 2009 (TIFF); February 26, 2010 (United States)
- Running time: 101 minutes
- Country: United States
- Language: English

The Art of the Steal is a 2009 documentary film directed by Don Argott, about the controversial move of the Barnes Foundation, generally considered to be the world's best collection of post-Impressionist art and valued in 2009 to be worth at least $25 billion, from Merion, Pennsylvania to Philadelphia. The move was disputed because Albert C. Barnes, who died in 1951, had specifically selected Lower Merion Township for its location. The collection was moved in 2012 to Philadelphia. The film presents an account of the claimed breaking of Barnes's will, which it presents as a decades-long process that was initiated by Philadelphians who were enemies of Barnes while he was alive, and that was continued by their heirs.

== Subject and making of the film ==
The will of Barnes established the Foundation with strict rules against ever moving the collection or any of its paintings away from its location, and to serve primarily as a school for the teaching of art, art criticism, and art appreciation, and not primarily as a museum for the general public. The people who supported the move argued that the collection should instead become a major tourist attraction for Philadelphia. The supporters of Merion claimed that the Philadelphians were less interested in Barnes's will than in enhancing their power by taking over the control of a $25+ billion asset.

The collection was located in a residential neighborhood about five miles from Philadelphia. Because of the constant efforts by the Philadelphia aristocracy to seize the collection, the Commonwealth of Pennsylvania refrained from contributing funds to make its endowment sufficient, but secretly arranged to provide $100 million of taxpayer funds only once the control of the Foundation was taken over by the new board. The new president and officers of the board succeeded in challenging the will to enable it to send some pieces on tour to earn enough money for needed renovations to the facility to preserve the artwork and provide security. But little went to the upkeep of the facility, because the funds were drained away by the legal contest of the will.

The 9,000-piece collection of mostly late-19th- and early-20th-century art includes 181 Renoirs, 69 Cézannes, 60 Matisses, 44 Picassos, and 14 Modiglianis. What makes the collection notable is not just the artists, but that Dr. Barnes acquired so many works of each of those artists.

While the film includes journalists, art historians and public figures on both sides of the long debate, many of the figures discussed in it, such as Rebecca Rimel (CEO of the Pew Charitable Trusts, the group which purportedly benefited financially from the Barnes's move); Raymond G. Perelman (a powerful local billionaire alleged to have orchestrated the move); and Bernard C. Watson (the president of the Barnes Foundation, who was accused of giving over its control to the Philadelphia authorities) declined to be interviewed for the documentary.

== Reception and distribution ==
The film was met with mixed and emotional reactions when it was shown at the New York Film Festival. Director Don Argott described the Q&A session that followed the film: "People were yelling, screaming at each other. These issues bring out these emotions. I'm not sure why. But for some reason the Barnes stirs something up in people." Executive Producer Lenny Feinberg said "[We had] no idea we would ever be where we are today ... everywhere we go, there's lines of people. We've not had a Q&A session where they haven't had to throw us out, because it went on too long."

Ten days after its premiere at the 2009 Toronto International Film Festival, the film was acquired by Rainbow Media, now AMC Networks, and owner of IFC Films. The film was ultimately distributed to more than 100 theaters in North America and made available for online streaming through SundanceNow.

In addition to the New York Film Festival and Toronto International Film Festival, the film was also named an Official Selection of the AFI Film Festival 2009.

In response to the film's release, Bernard C. Watson, chairman of the Barnes Foundation board of trustees and one of the figures criticized in the film, published an editorial letter in The Philadelphia Inquirer claiming the film "lacks objectivity and perspective." Derek Gillman, president and executive director of the foundation, said, "The film was full of unsubstantiated allegations and very one-sided. It was made by people who were hostile to the move and very angry about it. That's why we didn't cooperate with the filmmakers. It was not in our interests to do so."

Director Don Argott argued that presenting the story unfairly was not his intention, saying that he wanted supporters of the move to have a voice in the film. He added, "there are a lot of allegations and accusations and ... I think in fairness, certainly as a documentary filmmaker you want to have everybody's point of view come across in the most fair way that you can and we tried."

== Critical response ==
Roger Ebert of the Chicago Sun-Times gave the film 3 1/2 out of 4 stars and wrote, "It is perfectly clear exactly what Barnes specified in his will. It was drawn up by the best legal minds. It is clear that what happened to his collection was against his wishes. It is clear that the city fathers acted in obviation of those wishes, and were upheld in a court of appeals. What is finally clear: It doesn't matter a damn what your will says if you have $25 billion, and politicians and the establishment want it."

Owen Gleiberman of Entertainment Weekly gave the film a B+ and noted that "at times, The Art of the Steal is a bit too shocked by the vulgarity of commerce, but it's memorable when it meditates on the changing face of where we look at art, and how that changes the art itself."

As of October 2016, the review aggregator website Rotten Tomatoes reported that 85% of critics gave the film positive reviews, based on 60 reviews with an average score of 7.2/10. The site's consensus of reviews was: "Deeply esoteric and unapologetically one-sided, The Art of the Steal proves a documentary doesn't have to make an objective argument as long as it argues well." Metacritic, which uses a weighted average, assigned the film a score of 75 out of 100, based on 19 critics, indicating "generally favorable" reviews.
