= The Pew Charitable Trusts =

American non-governmental organization

- Established: January 1948; 78 years ago
- Chair: Christopher Jones
- President: Susan K. Urahn
- Faculty: 11 (board of directors)
- Staff: 969
- Budget: $374 million
- Endowment: $6.7 billion
- Address: 2005 Market Street, Suite 1700; Philadelphia, Pennsylvania 19103-7077
- Website: pew.org

The Pew Charitable Trusts is an independent non-profit, non-governmental organization (NGO), founded in 1948.

Pew's stated mission is to serve the public interest by "improving public policy, informing the public, and invigorating civic life". Pew operates projects and conducts research across five main areas: communities, conservation, finance and economy, governing, and health. In addition, the Pew Research Center is a nonpartisan public polling and think tank that operates as a subsidiary of The Pew Charitable Trusts.

== History ==
=== 20th century ===
Pew was established by the merging of several charitable trusts that had been established between 1948 and 1979. The original trusts were created by J. Howard Pew, Mary Ethel Pew, Joseph N. Pew Jr., and Mabel Pew Myrin, the adult sons and daughters of Sun Oil Company founder Joseph N. Pew and his wife, Mary Anderson Pew. Honoring their parents' religious conviction that good works should be done quietly, the original Pew Memorial Foundation was a grantmaking organization that made donations anonymously.

In 1956, the foundation became the Pew Memorial Trust, based in Philadelphia, the donors' hometown. Between 1957 and 1979, six other trusts were created, representing the personal and complementary philanthropic interests of the four siblings. Assets held by the seven trusts totaled $6 billion as of 2020. The Trusts continues to be based in Philadelphia, Pennsylvania, with offices in Washington, D.C., London, and Brussels.

Although The Pew Charitable Trusts is non-partisan and non-ideological, Joseph Pew and his sons were politically conservative. The modern day organization works to encourage responsive government and support scientific research on a wide range of issues, including global marine conservation, correction reform, and biomedical research. Pew also conducts research and supports civic and cultural projects in Philadelphia.

Early priorities of the Pew Memorial Trust included cancer research, the American Red Cross, and a pioneering project to assist historically black colleges. Later beneficiaries included American Enterprise Institute, Brookings Institution, American Liberty League, John Birch Society, Oceana, and Woods Hole Oceanographic Institution.

In 2004, Pew applied to the Internal Revenue Service (IRS) to change its status from a private foundation to a public charity in order to operate its own programs more efficiently. Since that change it can now raise funds freely and devote up to 5% of its budget to lobbying the public sector.

In 2011, the Pew family was awarded the Carnegie Medal of Philanthropy in recognition of its support for The Pew Charitable Trusts.

According to the Pew Trusts' website as of 2024, four of the eleven Directors serving on the Board are named Pew.

== Projects ==
Pew operates several projects focused on specific public policy issues: modernization of the civil legal system, Philadelphia local public policies; justice and public safety; student loans; ocean and fisheries protection; conservation of public lands and rivers; consumer finance and the greater economy; government reform; and public health issues.

=== Maritime protection ===
The Trusts, with other groups, backed an effort to create marine protected areas in the Pacific Ocean, near the Mariana Islands. The protected area was officially designated in January 2009, and includes the Mariana Trench, the deepest ocean canyon in the world. Another marine protected area that the Trusts and other groups sought to protect is Papahānaumokuākea Marine National Monument which was protected by President Bush in 2006 and expanded by President Obama in 2016.

=== Pew Research Center ===
The Trusts also funds the Pew Research Center, the third-largest think tank in Washington, D.C., after the Brookings Institution and the Center for American Progress.

=== Justice and corrections reform ===
The Trusts have worked closely with the Vera Institute of Justice on issues related to state correction policies in the Public Safety Performance Project. In 2008, Pew reported that more than one in 100 adults in the United States is in jail or prison, an all-time high. The cost to state governments is nearly $50 billion a year and the federal government $5 billion more. The report compiled and analyzed data from the federal Bureau of Justice Statistics and Federal Bureau of Prisons and each state's department of corrections.

Pew reported in 2009 that "explosive growth in the number of people on probation or parole has propelled the population of the American corrections system to more than 7.3 million, or 1 in every 31 U.S. adults." "One in 31: The Long Reach of American Corrections" examined the scale and cost of prison, jail, probation and parole in each of the 50 states, and provides a blueprint for states to cut both crime and spending by reallocating prison expenses to fund stronger supervision of the large number of offenders in the community.

Pew supported police reforms enacted by the state of Washington in 2021. Gov. Jay Inslee (D-WA) signed 12 separate police reform bills that would, among other things, require officers to intervene when they see another officer using excessive force.

=== Health ===
"Based on data, science, and non-partisan research, Pew works to reduce hidden risks to the health, safety, and well-being of American consumers." One program, the Pew Scholars Program in the Biomedical Sciences, is intended to support promising early and mid-career scientists investigating human health, both basic and clinical. The awards provide flexible support ($240,000 over a four-year period). Grantees are encouraged to be entrepreneurial and innovative in their research.

In October 2020, the Trusts unveiled research on naloxone, the lifesaving overdose reversal drug. Pew researchers concluded that expanded access to naloxone saves lives and put forth several recommendations on how to do so, including options such as co-prescribing naloxone with opioids.

During the rollout of vaccines for the COVID-19 pandemic, Pew supported the CDC's determination that it was acceptable to leave some vaccine vials partially unused (potentially "wasting vaccines") in order to vaccinate teenagers, which represented a policy shift by the CDC regarding the efficient use of vaccines.

== Finances ==
According to the 2019 Consolidated Financial Statements, as of 30 June 2019, the Trusts owned over US$6.7 billion in assets. For the 12 months ending on that date, total revenues were about US$374 million and total expenses were about $341 million, of which about $6.6 million were for fundraising expenses.

According to IRS Form 990, filed for 2019 by Pew Charitable Trusts, the organization distributed $142,114,349 in grants in 2019; an increase from 2018, when it distributed $136,947,523 in grants.

== Controversy ==
=== Barnes Art Collection ===
The Trusts have supported the relocation of the famed Barnes Art Collection from its longtime home in Lower Merion, PA, to Center City. This has been controversial in the art world. The Barnes Foundation was established by Albert C. Barnes in 1922 to "promote the advancement of education and the appreciation of the fine arts and horticulture."

According to the Barnes Foundation:

The Barnes is home to one of the world's largest collections of Impressionist, Post-Impressionist and early Modern paintings, with especially deep holdings by Renoir, Matisse, and Picasso", as well as important examples of African art, Native American pottery and jewelry, Pennsylvania German furniture, American avant-garde painting, and wrought-iron metalwork.

Opponents of relocating the collection to a new museum along the Benjamin Franklin Parkway said that move violates Barnes's will that the collection stay intact at its original location and not be loaned, transferred or sold. Columnist Roger Ebert of the Chicago Sun-Times wrote in 2010, "It is perfectly clear exactly what Barnes specified in his will. It was drawn up by the best legal minds. It is clear that what happened to his collection was against his wishes." Yet the Barnes Foundation prevailed in a series of legal actions and the new museum opened on May 16, 2012. At the opening Barnes trustee and treasurer Stephen Harmelin noted, "There were financial challenges to be faced...questions about how the foundation as it existed could go on with its mission, worries about the safety and integrity of the collection in the long run," he said. "We were convinced that the only change that could save the Barnes was to redouble our commitment to its mission, to reach out more widely than ever before, to build, to expand and to move the collection to a more accessible location."

The Trusts became involved with the Barnes Collection when the foundation overseeing the art collection had serious financial trouble, ultimately contributing more than $20 million for a new museum. Reporter Roberta Smith of the New York Times said of the new building, "Against all odds, the museum that opens to the public on Saturday is still very much the old Barnes, only better."

The controversy involving Pew, other donors, the Barnes trustees and the collection was the subject of a documentary film The Art of the Steal. The Trusts did not participate in the film. Rebecca Rimel, then head of The Pew Charitable Trusts, said they believed the film would not be fair.

=== Texas Public Policy Foundation ===
Between 2011 and 2015, The Pew Charitable Trusts gave $4.7 million to the Texas Public Policy Foundation (TPPF), earmarked specifically for the foundation's criminal justice reform project.

== See also ==
- Pew Research Center
