= University of Virginia School of Nursing =

Public college in Charlottesville, Virginia, US

- Type: Public
- Established: 1901
- Dean: Dorrie K. Fontaine
- Students: 681
- Location: Charlottesville, VA, US; 38°01′53″N 78°29′56″W
- Campus: Suburban
- Website: http://www.nursing.virginia.edu/

The University of Virginia School of Nursing, established in 1901, is a school of nursing education. It has an enrollment of approximately 800 students (roughly half undergraduate and half graduate students), and is consistently rated in the top 4% of U.S. nursing schools. After the retirement of Dorrie K. Fontaine as the fifth dean of the School, two-term American Nurses Association President Pam Cipriano, a research faculty member at UVA for years, stepped in as interim dean in August 2019.

== History ==
The School of Nursing was founded in 1901. In 1928, the first baccalaureate nursing program in the South began at the University of Virginia. Men were first admitted in the 1960s. The first nursing PhD program offered in Virginia began at the School of Nursing in 1982, and in 2008, it became the first facility in Virginia to offer a DNP (Doctor of Nursing Practice) degree - the terminal degree for nursing clinicians.

== Academics ==
The School of Nursing offers a variety of options for attaining or augmenting a nursing degree.

Undergraduate

- Bachelor of Science in Nursing (BSN)
  - The Bachelor of Science in Nursing program is a four-year undergraduate program, offered for both traditional entry students and second-year transfers from a traditional undergraduate program. Students begin clinical coursework during their second year, including rigorous courses in pathophysiology and pharmacology (requirements that are over and above the scope of traditional BSN programs), and also begin clinical rotations the second semester of their second year after developing skills in the Clinical Simulation Learning Center, the School's 10,000 square foot skills lab.
- RN to BSN Program
  - The RN to BSN program is a part-time, executive format program uniquely tailored for RNs who wish to earn the personal and professional benefits a baccalaureate degree confers. Recognizing the experience an RN possesses prior to admission, RN to BSN students are individually assigned to work with a faculty advisor to create a plan of study to best meet their own personal academic and professional goals.
- Third Year Transfer to BSN
  - The Third Year Transfer to BSN program is a five-semester long program that enrolls students who have completed two years (55-60 credits) of college level work before transfer, either from a four-year institution, or from a two-year community college or associate degree program. Applicants who are accepted for transfer will enter the School of Nursing in the summer session.

Graduate

- MSN
  - The Master's of Science in Nursing is an advanced practice degree that trains RNs to take a more direct role in patient care and managing care plans. The MSN degrees is available through a variety of specialty areas: Adult-Gerontology Acute Care CNS or NP; Family Nurse Practitioner; Pediatric Nurse Practitioner; Neonatal Nurse Practitioner; Pediatric-Acute Care Nurse Practitioner; and Psychiatric Mental Health Nurse Practitioner.
- Post-Master's Programs
  - Post-Master's Programs are for individuals who already possess a MSN who wish to earn additional specialty certifications. Post-master's graduate are trained to assume the roles of clinician, educator and researcher, as well as clinical consultant and clinical leader. Emphasis is placed on providing students with the advanced theoretical knowledge and practice skills needed to function in increasingly complex care settings across the care continuum. Evidenced based practice, outcomes management, clinical research, and advanced clinical decision-making are also emphasized. Post-Masters Programs are offered in a variety of specialties.
- Doctoral (PhD and DNP) and Post-Doctoral Programs
  - The School of Nursing offers two doctoral programs in nursing to prepare expert clinicians and practitioners, as well as nursing scientists and researchers, to expand nursing knowledge in this new century in nursing leadership and faculty roles. The DNP program, in particular, focuses students to become leaders with expertise in specialty practice who can utilize research evidence to effect practice change, as opposed to the more theoretical approach of the PhD program.
- Clinical Nurse Leader (CNL)
  - The UVA School of Nursing's Clinical Nurse Leader program is a fast-track into the nursing profession for individuals with at least a bachelor's degree who wish to pivot into the field from another profession. Over its two-year, full-time program, CNL students (who earn a master's degree) become nurse generalists, prepared to direct care at the unit level.

== Affiliations and accreditation ==
The School of Nursing is a member of the Council of Baccalaureate and Higher Degree programs of the National League for Nursing, the American Association of Colleges of Nursing, and the Southern Council on Collegiate Education for Nursing of the Southern Regional Education Board. The school is nationally accredited, and approved by the Virginia State Board of Nursing. The School of Nursing is also the sole American nursing school to participate in Universitas 21, with exchange and research programs set up with the University of Auckland in New Zealand, and Oxford University in the United Kingdom. It also offers students regular opportunities to study and serve in Nicaragua, South Africa, St. Kitts, Denmark, Australia and New Zealand.

== Rankings ==
The School of Nursing's graduate programs are ranked in the top 4 percent of US nursing schools (out of more than 800 American nursing schools) and Virginia's only nursing graduate program to be ranked among the nation's top 25 (U.S. News & World Report, 2020). Several of its programs are also ranked in the nation's top 20. More than half of the School of Nursing's full-time research faculty hold national nursing Academy fellowships, and ten presidents and immediate past-presidents of key national and regional nursing organizations make the School their academic home.

== See also ==
- Nursing school
- List of nursing schools in the United States
