= Staffel =

Staffel, a German-language term used in several contexts to name a division or unit, may also refer to:

== Military ==
- Staffel (unit), in the air forces of German-speaking countries

== Places ==
- Staffel (mountain), in Bavaria, Germany
- Staffelsee (Lake Staffel), in Garmisch-Partenkirchen, Bavaria, Germany
- Staffel, a constituent community of Limburg an der Lahn, Hesse, Germany
  - Staffel station, a railway station

== People with the surname ==
- Izrael Abraham Staffel (1814–1884), Polish watchmaker, mechanic and inventor
- Megan Staffel (born 1952), American writer
- Rudolf Staffel (1911–2002), American ceramist

== See also ==
- Staffelkapitän, a position (not a rank) in flying units (Staffel) of the German Luftwaffe
- Schutzstaffel, a major paramilitary organization under Adolf Hitler and the Nazi Party
- Tim Staffell (born 1948), English rock singer and bass guitarist
