= John E. Dowell Jr. =

American printmaker, professor (b. 1941)

John Edward Dowell Jr.
- Born: 1941 (age 84–85); Philadelphia, Pennsylvania, U.S.
- Education: Art Students' League of Philadelphia, Tyler School of Art (BFA), Tamarind Institute
- Occupations: Visual artist, printmaker, educator, painter
- Known for: Etching, lithography
- Website: johndowell.com

John Edward Dowell Jr. (born 1941) is an American printmaker, painter, and educator. He was a professor of printmaking at the Tyler School of Art at Temple University in Philadelphia.

== Life and education ==
Dowell was born on March 25, 1941, in Philadelphia, Pennsylvania, and grew up in a housing project there. As a child, he explored art with his brother by copying the work in Lone Ranger comics.

When he was young he took classes at the Art Students' League of Philadelphia. Dowell studied at the Tyler School of Art at Temple University (now Tyler School of Art and Architecture), where he was mentored by ceramist Rudolf Staffel. He graduated from Tyler School of Art in 1963. He mastered his printmaking skills at the Tamarind Institute in Los Angeles, California, where he worked as a senior printer.

== Career ==
His work is influenced by abstract expressionists Willem de Kooning, Philip Guston, and Jackson Pollock and jazz musicians such as Miles Davis, Archie Shepp, and Cecil Taylor. While visiting Bahia, Brazil in 1988, Dowell explored interest in traditional African religions. He later converted to the voodoo religion, but later was defrocked from the Voodoo priesthood.

Dowell is well known for works keyed to music. He often focuses on abstract visual representations of poetry and music, notably jazz. In the late 1980s, he focused on art related to the voodoo religion. These works were inspired by voodoo forces and spirits.

Dowell's first individual exhibition was at the Swope Art Museum in 1968. Dowell's canvas, ceramic, and print works are showcased at over 70 museums worldwide, and he has had more than 50 solo exhibitions. He has also participated in a number of group exhibitions, including in "Philadelphia Teaches Printmaking" at Philadelphia's Print Club in 1978. His works are featured in many collections, including the Minneapolis Institute of Art, the Philadelphia Museum of Art, and the Smithsonian American Art Museum. Dowell also recorded photographic images of the President's House archaeological site.

Dowell's work was featured in the 2015 exhibition We Speak: Black Artists in Philadelphia, 1920s-1970s at the Woodmere Art Museum.

Dowell has received many awards for his work, including the James Van Der Zee award from the Brandywine Workshop, and grants from the National Endowment for the Arts.
