= David Sellin =

American art historian

David Frost Sellin (13 April 1930, Philadelphia, Pennsylvania – 11 April 2006, Washington, D.C.) was an American art historian, curator, educator, and author. He taught at a number of universities, worked on the staffs of several museums, and served as curator of the U.S. Capitol, 1976-1980.

== Biography ==
He was born in Philadelphia, Pennsylvania, the third son of University of Pennsylvania professor Thorsten Sellin and Amy Anderson. He and his two elder brothers attended Quaker schools. As a teenager, Sellin studied privately with painter Frank B. A. Linton, a former student of Thomas Eakins. He spent a year in Sweden in the atelier of painter Otte Sköld. Sellin received a bachelor's degree, 1952 magna cum laude, and a master's degree in art history, 1956, from the University of Pennsylvania. He returned to Stockholm to study for a year at the Royal Swedish Academy of Arts, and studied for two years in Rome as a Fulbright scholar.

Sellin returned to Philadelphia, and worked as an assistant curator at the Philadelphia Museum of Art, 1958-1960. He served as administrator of schools at the Pennsylvania Academy of the Fine Arts (PAFA), 1960-1962. He completed a doctorate in art history at the University of Pennsylvania, 1968.

Sellin's research into the influence of France on 19th-century Philadelphia artists – notably Joseph A. Bailly, Mary Cassatt, Eakins, and Howard Roberts – culminated in a 1973 exhibition at the Philadelphia Museum of Art. Sellin curated three additional exhibitions featuring Eakins as a subject—American Art in the Making: Preparatory Studies for Masterpieces of American Painting, 1800-1900 (Smithsonian Institution, 1976); Thomas Eakins, Susan Macdowell Eakins, Elizabeth Macdowell Kenton (PAFA, 1977); and Thomas Eakins and His Fellow Artists at the Philadelphia Sketch Club (Philadelphia Sketch Club, 2001). Sellin's research into expatriate American artists who settled in France led to a 1982 joint exhibition by PAFA and the Phoenix Art Museum, that also traveled to France.

Sellin was a lecturer at the University of Pennsylvania, Harvard University, American University, Tulane University, the University of Texas, and other universities. While serving on the faculties of Colgate University, 1963-1968, and Wesleyan University, 1969-1972, he also directed their art galleries.

Sellin moved to Washington, D.C. in 1971, to work as a research fellow at what became the Smithsonian Museum of American Art. As curator of the U.S. Capitol, 1976-1980, he oversaw restoration of four of the massive paintings in the Rotunda, and conserved hundreds of architectural drawings by Thomas U. Walter, architect of the Capitol's dome. He published numerous articles on American artists, and worked as an independent curator and consultant.

=== Exhibitions ===
- African Art and the School of Paris, Colgate University, 1966.
- The First Pose: Howard Roberts, Thomas Eakins, and a Century of Philadelphia Nudes, Philadelphia Museum of Art, 1973.
- American Art in the Making: Preparatory Studies for Masterpieces of American Painting, 1800-1900, Smithsonian Institution, 1976.
- Thomas Eakins, Susan Macdowell Eakins, Elizabeth Macdowell Kenton, Pennsylvania Academy of the Fine Arts, 1977.
- Americans in Brittany and Normandy, 1860-1910, Pennsylvania Academy of the Fine Arts and Phoenix Art Museum, 1982, co-curated with James K. Ballinger.
- William Lamb Picknell, 1853–1897, Taggart & Jurgensen Gallery, Washington, D.C., 1991.
- The Ipswich Painters at Home and Abroad: Dow, Kenyon, Mansfield, Richardson, Wendel; Cape Anne Historical Society, 1993, co-curated with Stephanie R. Gaskins.
- Thomas Eakins and His Fellow Artists at the Philadelphia Sketch Club, Philadelphia Sketch Club, 2001. Mark Sullivan contributed an essay to the catalogue.

=== Publications ===
- "A Benbridge Conversation Piece," Philadelphia Museum of Art Bulletin, 1961.
- "Denis A. Volozan, Philadelphia Neoclassicist," Winterthur Portfolio 4, 1968, 118-128.
- "1876: Turning Point in American Art," Fairmount Park Art Association Annual Report, Philadelphia, 1975.
- "The First Pose, 1876: Turing Point in American Art-Howard Roberts, Thomas Eakins, and a Century of Philadelphia Nudes", W.W. Norton & Company, Inc, New York, 1976, (ISBN 0 393 04447 5)
- "Frieseke in Le Pouldu and Giverny: The Black Gang and the Giverny Group," Frederick Carl Frieseke: The Evolution of an American Expressionism, Telfair Museum of Art, 2001.
- "Imogene Robinson Morrell (1837–1908)," Resource Library Magazine, November 8, 2002.

=== Personal ===
David Sellin married Anne C. Robertson on November 27, 1965. He died of lymphatic cancer in Washington, D.C., 11 April 2006. He was survived by his widow Anne R. Sellin, and his brothers Theodore Sellin of Washington, D.C. and Eric Sellin of Philadelphia.
