= Frank B. A. Linton =

American painter & teacher (1871–1943)

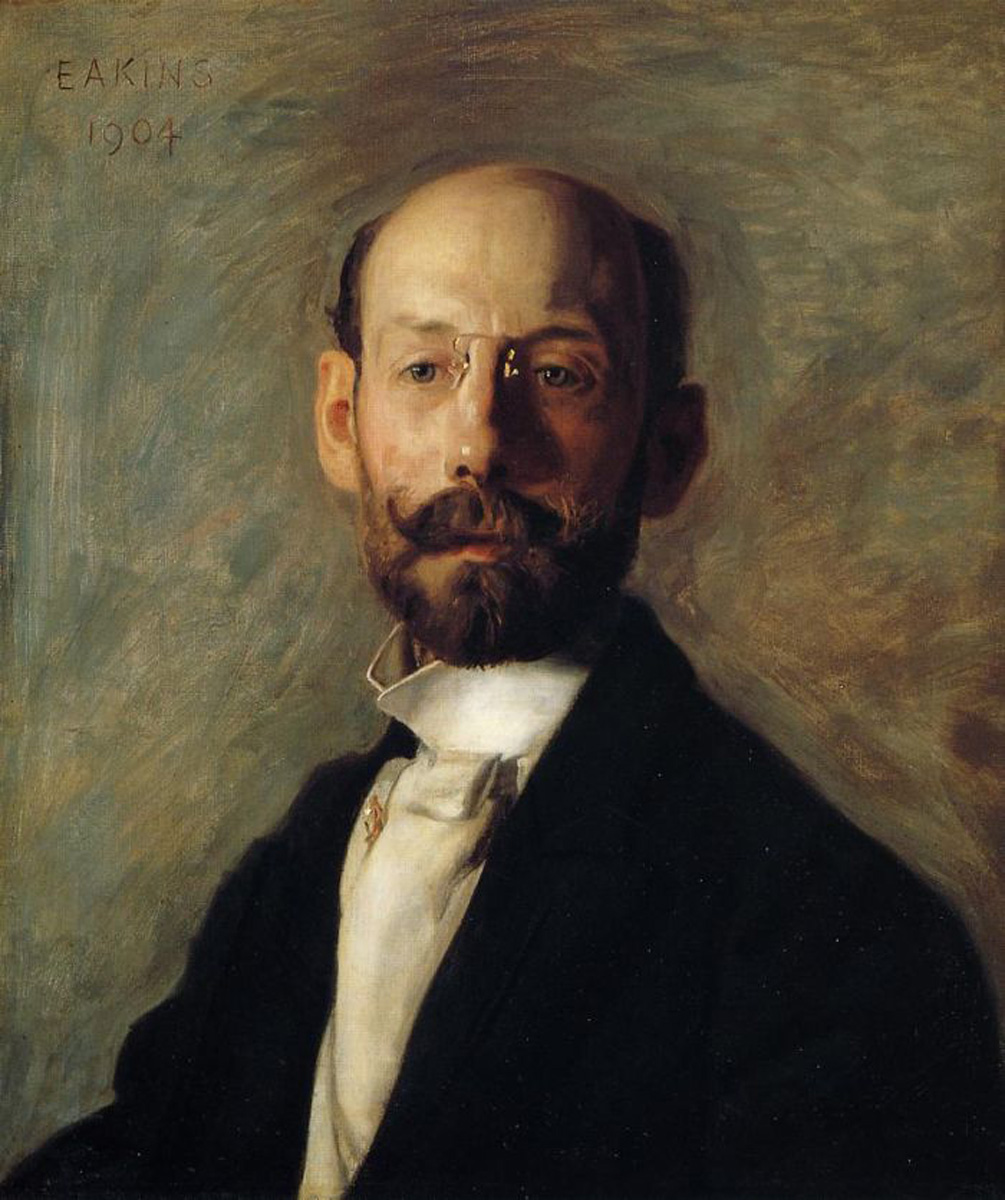
Portrait of Frank B. A. Linton (1904) by Thomas Eakins.

Frank Benton Ashley Linton (February 26, 1871, Philadelphia, Pennsylvania – November 13, 1943, Philadelphia, Pennsylvania) was an American portrait-painter and teacher. He was a student of Thomas Eakins, studied the École des Beaux-Arts, and won a bronze medal at the 1927 Salon Nationale in Paris. (Note: New York Times obituary: PHILADELPHIA. November 15 [1943] — Frank Benton Ashley Linton, Philadelphia artist who won the bronze medal in the Paris salon in 1927, died Saturday after a long illness. His age was 72. "The Last Touch" was the canvas that won for Mr. Linton the greatest recognition. After it had won in the Paris Salon, the painting was purchased by the French Government for exhibition in the Luxembourg Galleries. It was planned to place the work in the Louvre after Mr. Linton's death. Finished in 1922, "The Last Touch" was exhibited in this city and in New York, Baltimore and Washington before being sent to Paris. The painting is a life-size portrait of a circus clown making up for a performance. Mr. Linton had the distinction of having a one-man exhibition at the Corcoran Galleries in Washington. Born here, he studied with Thomas Eakins and later in Paris at the Ecole des Beaux Arts and Academie Julienne. He was a member of the Societe le Internationale des Beaux Arts et de Lettres. He was a cousin of the late Sir James Linton, for many years president of the Royal Academy of London. In 1921 he was commissioned by the Knights of Columbus to paint a portrait of General Pershing, which was presented to France by the War Department. Among his other portraits are those of Bianca Saroya, Ruth St. Denis, Admiral Benson and Cardinal Dougherty, the last named now hanging in the Apostolic Delegation Building in Washington. Mr. Linton leaves a brother, Cornelius H. Linton of Somerton.) Likely a closeted gay man, he lived with pianist Samuel Meyers for more than thirty years.

== Biography ==
Linton was the son of Philadelphia building contractor Edwin Ruthven Linton and Sarah Piper. His father was a cousin of the British painter Sir James Dromgole Linton, president of the Royal Institute of Painters in Water Colours. Linton attended Philadelphia public schools, and entered the Pennsylvania Academy of the Fine Arts in 1885 (at age 14). He studied under Thomas Eakins, and remained at PAFA following Eakins's forced resignation in 1886. He studied again under Eakins at the Art Students' League of Philadelphia from 1888 to 1890. He was admitted to the École des Beaux-Arts in 1890, and studied under Eakins's teachers, Jean-Léon Gérôme and Léon Bonnat. Reversing the usual course, he then studied at the Academie Julien under Jean-Joseph Benjamin-Constant, Jean Paul Laurens, and William-Adolphe Bouguereau. He returned to Philadelphia around 1896.

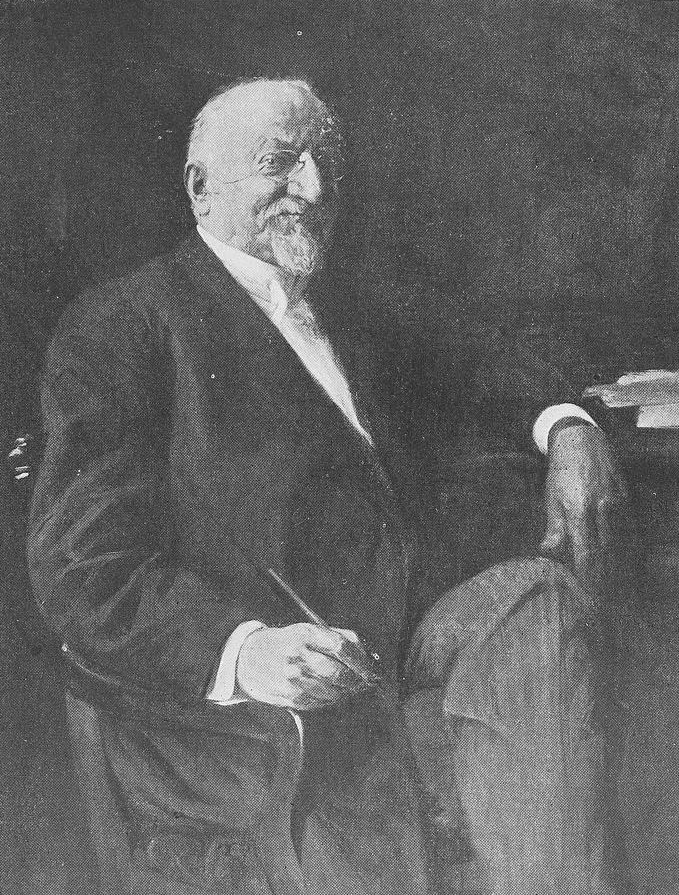
Portrait of Dr. William H. Greene (c.1912), unlocated. (Note: "Mr. Frank B. A. Linton's portraits of Dr. Wm. H. Greene, and of Wm. L. Austin, Esq., deserve the highest praise as the most successful delineations of the character of the subjects.")

Linton painted hundreds of portraits of Philadelphia businessmen, physicians, college faculty, politicians and artists, and also portraits of "Society" matrons and children. These ranged from life-sized, full-length portraits to portrait miniatures. (Note: Linton exhibited five portrait miniatures at the annual exhibition of the Art Club of Philadelphia in March 1902.) He sometimes worked as a copyist, painting replicas of American colonial and federal portraits, or posthumous portraits from photographs. He occasionally painted landscapes and still lifes, and modeled sculpture.

Linton had a special affinity for portraits of women. He exhibited An Evening's Reminiscence at the 1904 St. Louis World's Fair, a full-length painting of a nude woman seated before her dressing table and examining a rose. He painted an imperious full-length portrait of the dancer Ruth St. Denis, and a sensual full-length portrait of Ada Forman, a member of St. Denis's dance troupe. The Silver Heel was his playful full-length portrait of his friend and former student, Agnes Allen.

Linton exhibited regularly at the conservative Société Nationale des Beaux-Arts – known as the "Salon Nationale" – from about 1906 to the onset of World War II. He exhibited semi-regularly at PAFA between 1895 and 1912. He had a one-man show at the Corcoran Gallery of Art in Washington, D.C. in 1917, (Note: "The Corcoran Gallery of Art has planned an interesting series of One Man exhibitions for the coming season. the first of these, which opened September 26th, comprised 25 paintings by Frank B. A. Linton of Philadelphia.") and at the Reading Public Museum in 1939.

Following World War I, Linton was commissioned by the Knights of Columbus to paint a full-length portrait of Commander of American Expeditionary Forces General John J. Pershing, as a gift from the United States to France. The portrait hangs in Les Invalides, the French national military museum in Paris.

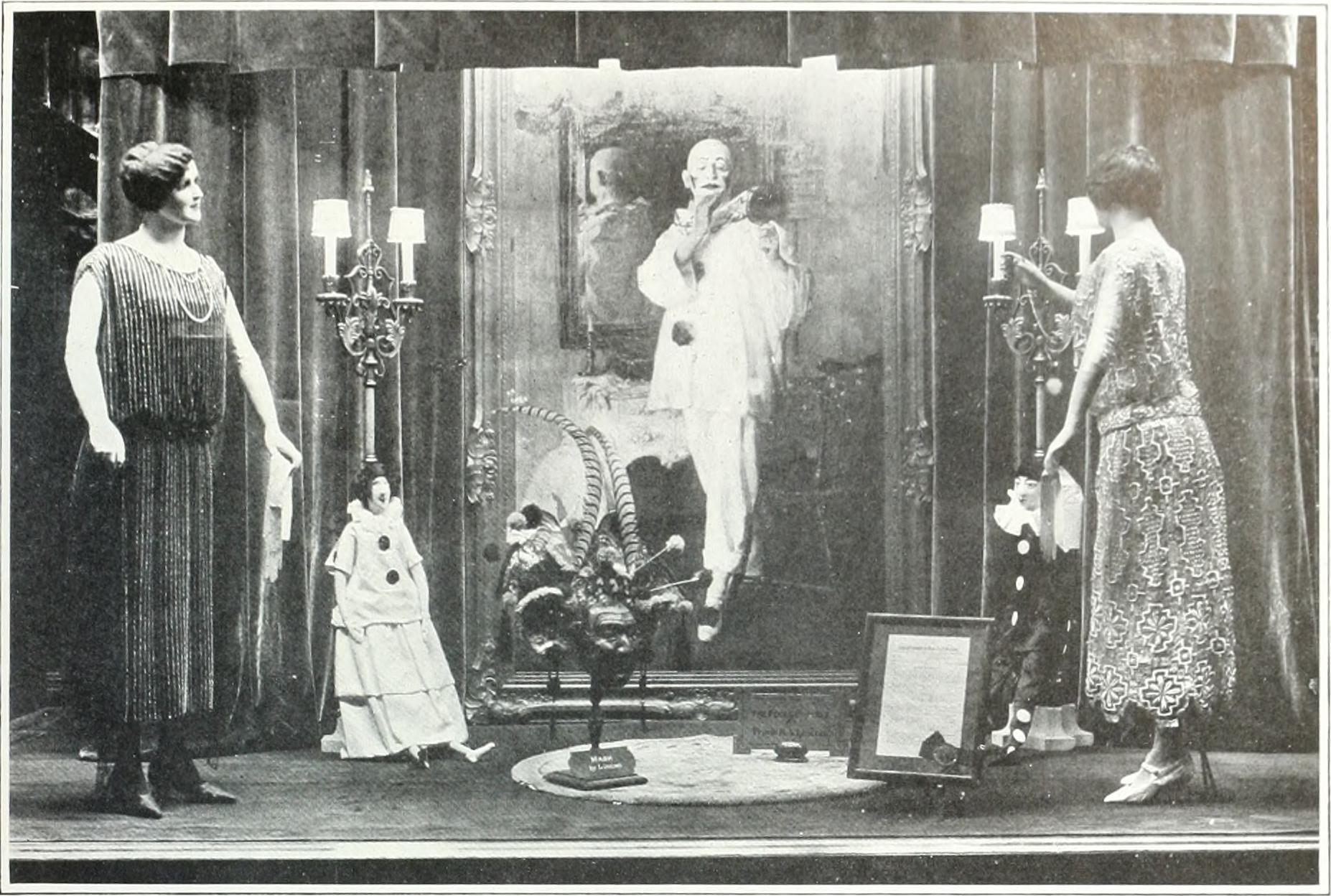
The Last Touch, on display in a department store window during Philadelphia Art Week, 1922. The painting was awarded a bronze medal at the 1927 Salon Nationale, and purchased for the Musée du Luxembourg.

Linton had his greatest professional success with a humorous twist on the traditional subject of a beautiful woman at her dressing table. A Fool's Finesse depicted a circus clown standing before his dressing table, and carefully applying one last touch of greasepaint. The painting was rejected for PAFA's 1922 annual exhibition, but was displayed later that year in a window of Wanamaker's department store during Philadelphia Art Week. Renamed The Last Touch (Le Denière Retouche), Linton submitted it to the 1927 Salon Nationale, where it was awarded a bronze medal and purchased for the Musée du Luxembourg, with the intention that it hang in the Louvre after Linton's death. The following year, Linton was decorated by the French government with the rank of Officier d'Academie.

=== 1941 Profile ===
Mr. Linton's facility and versatility, which have often been remarked, are only superficial aspects of his art, which is profound in its inspiration and superlative in its expression. He is not only a brilliant draftsman and colorist, a master of the brush but also possesses the keen psychological insight, which is the hallmark of genius in portraiture, and a freshness of outlook which reflects the rare quality of his creative imagination and lends individuality to his work. Among present-day artists his gifts are unsurpassed and they have won for him the highest honors in the world of art.

His claims to serious consideration, particularly in portraiture and figure work, were soon recognized and at the age of twenty-three he was awarded the silver medal for his exhibit at the American Art Exhibition. His first portrait hung in Paris, that of Dr. J. L. Borsch of Philadelphia, won for him enormous acclaim.

Mr. Linton is also a member of the Internationale Union des Beaux-arts et Lettres, to which only one member in the entire world is elected each year. He received this honor in 1913, (Note: Linton was elected to the Internationale Union des Beaux-arts et Lettres for his painting Moment Musical, a portrait of pianist Samuel Meyers. The French government was considering buying the painting for the Musée du Luxembourg, when the outbreak of World War I ended negotiations.) when his name was enrolled among the illustrious greats comprising the membership of the Internationale Union des Beaux-Arts et Lettres, including such personages as Kipling, Rodin, Degas, Anatole France, Renoir and many more.

=== Personal ===
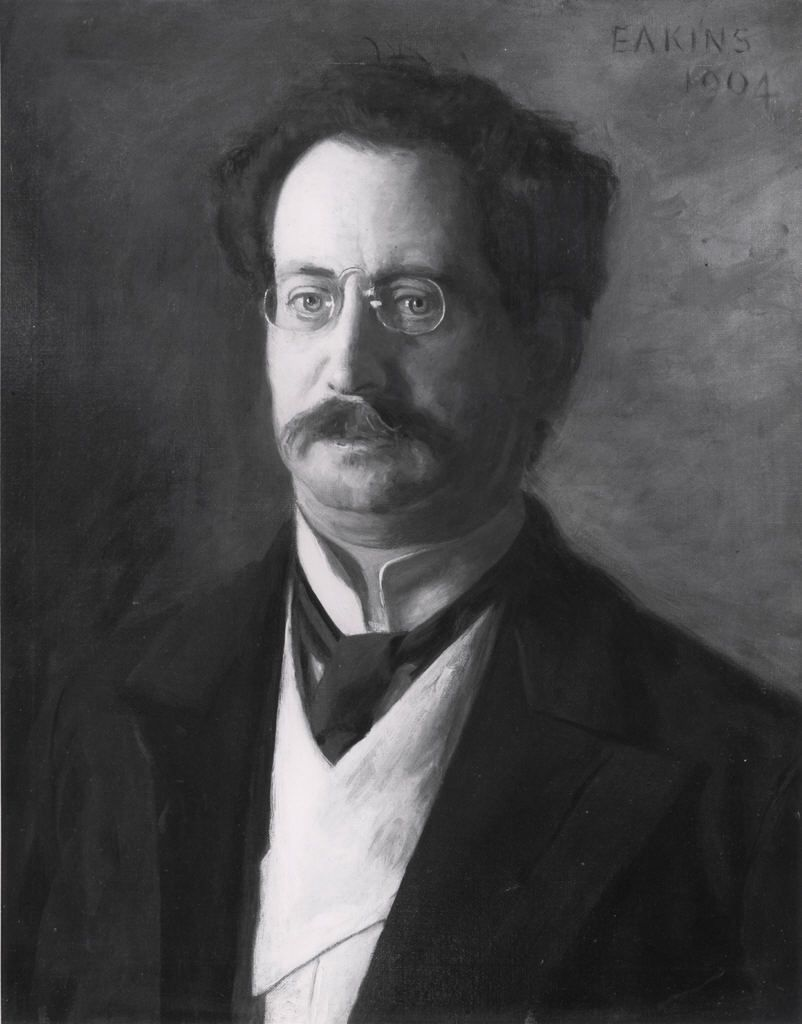
Portrait of Samuel Meyers (1904) by Thomas Eakins

Linton's life partner was the German-American classical pianist Samuel Meyers (1854–1933). They shared a house and studio at 1707 Chestnut Street from 1901 to 1924. Eakins was a frequent guest at their Saturday afternoon musicales, and painted portraits of both men. (The portraits are at the Hirshhorn Museum and Sculpture Garden.) It is likely that it was at one of the musicales that Eakins met the Philadelphia Orchestra violinist Hedda van den Beemt. Music (1904), (Note: Music is in the collection of the Albright–Knox Art Gallery. A study for it, The Violinist, is at the Hirshhorn Museum and Sculpture Garden. A sketch for Music is at the Philadelphia Museum of Art.) Eakins's portrait of van den Beemt, features Meyers in the background as the pianist.

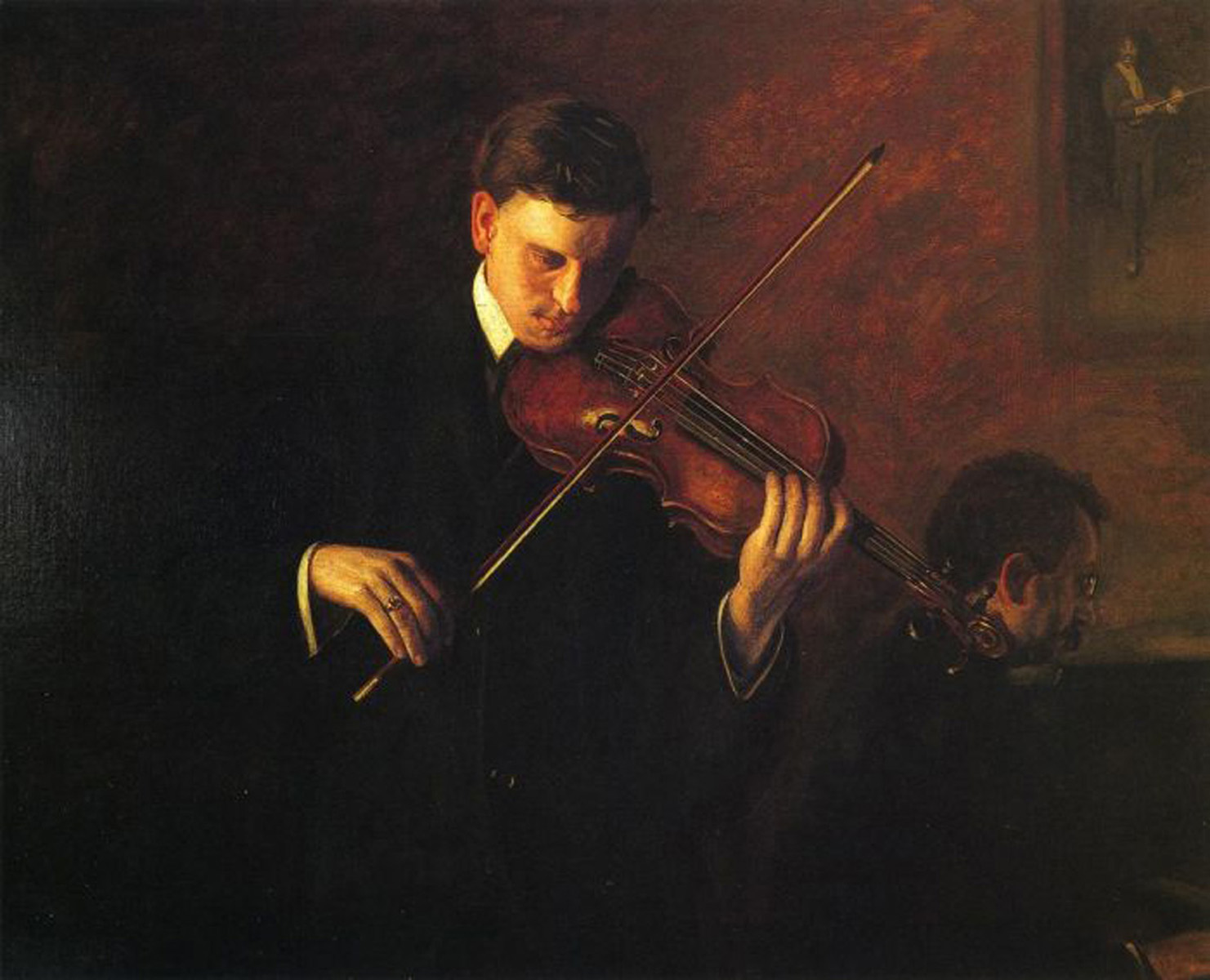
Music (1904) by Thomas Eakins. Hedda van den Beemt was the violinist, Samuel Meyers was the accompanist.

Linton hosted a March 1924 art exhibition at his Chestnut Street studio featuring paintings by fellow Eakins students Charles Bregler, David Wilson Jordan and Susan Macdowell Eakins (Eakins's widow), along with his own works.

Linton and Meyers moved to a house and studio at 2037 Delancey Street by 1925. Meyers died in July 1933. Linton continued living there through a long illness, until his death in 1943.

=== Legacy ===
Linton may be better remembered as the subject of Thomas Eakins's 1904 portrait than for his own paintings. He was also the model for a statuette by sculptor Samuel Murray, that was exhibited at the 1904 World's Fair. Murray and he were among the former Eakins students who had successful careers. Linton reportedly could command $5,000 to $10,000 for a portrait commission in the 1920s, but he died insolvent, and his paintings and possessions were sold to pay creditors. PAFA's Charles Bregler Collection contains a number of photographs of Linton by Eakins or Eakins's circle. He was one of the former Eakins students interviewed by Lloyd Goodrich for his 1933 biography, Thomas Eakins: His Life and Work.

Linton's private students included artists Agnes Allen, Lila Oliver Asher, Mabel B. Davis, Berla Emeree, Eleanora G. Fiore, Robert O. Frick, Edward Newnam, Joy Rubin, and art historian David Sellin.

Linton's works are in the collections of the Pennsylvania Academy of the Fine Arts, the Delaware Art Museum, the Musée du Luxembourg in Paris, the University of Pennsylvania, the University of Delaware, Girard College, the College of Physicians of Philadelphia, and many private collections.

== Selected works ==
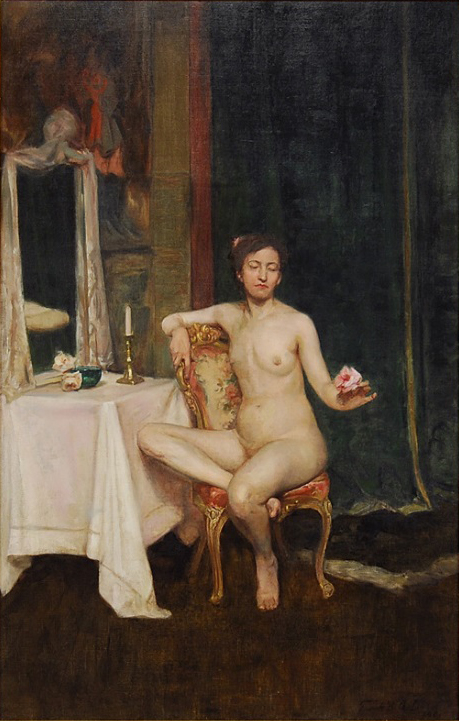
An Evening's Reminiscence (1901), unlocated

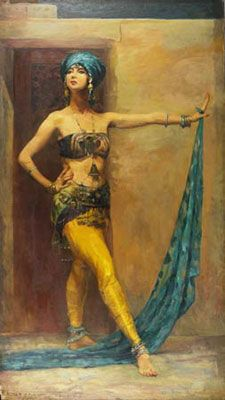
Orientale—Portrait of Ruth St. Denis (c.1918), unlocated

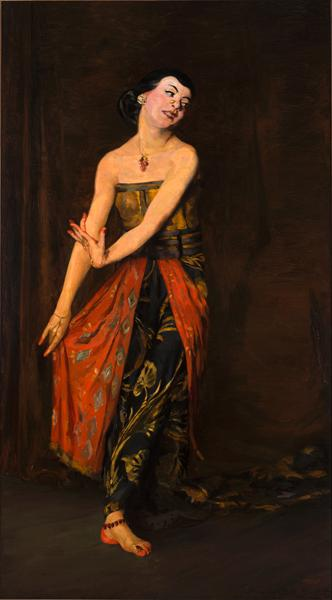
Portrait of Ada Forman in Her Javanese Palace Dance (1920), Delaware Art Museum

=== Portraits ===
- Portrait of George R. Bonfield (c.1895). Bonfield was a Philadelphia landscape painter. Exhibited at PAFA, 1895.
- Portrait of Frederic B. Peakes (c.1899). Peakes was a concert pianist. Exhibited at PAFA, 1899.
- Posthumous Portrait of Dr. James A. McCrea (c.1900), unlocated. Dr. McCrea was a Philadelphia physician. Painted from a photograph. Sold at Northeast Auctions, Portsmouth, New Hampshire, 17 May 2008, Lot 11.
  - James A. McCrea with a Dog (c.1900), unlocated. Copy after Thomas Sully's c.1815 portrait of McCrea as a boy.
- Portrait of Dr. J. Louis Borsch (1906), unlocated. (Note: "Frank B. Linton, whose studio is at 1707 Chestnut Street, is giving a series of musical afternoons, which are exceedingly popular. Mr. Linton has recently done a charming miniature of Mrs. Robert Emmott Hare, and at present is engaged on a three-quarter portrait of Dr. Lewis (sic) Borsch.) Dr. Borsch was a Philadelphia ophthalmologist.
- Portrait of Dr. Matthew Woods (c.1906), private collection. Dr. Woods was a Philadelphia physician and author. Exhibited at PAFA, 1906.
- Portrait of the Rev. Dr. Perry S. Allen (before 1910) Dr. Allen was a Presbyterian minister.
- Portrait of Mrs. Perry S. Allen, (before 1910)
- Portrait of Samuel Meyers (by 1912), Pennsylvania Academy of the Fine Arts, Philadelphia, Pennsylvania Exhibited at PAFA, 1912.
- Portrait of Dr. William H. Greene (c.1912). Dr. Greene was a chemistry professor at the University of Pennsylvania. Exhibited at PAFA, 1912.
- Portrait of William L. Austin, Esq. (c.1912). Austin was president of the Baldwin Locomotive Works. Exhibited at PAFA, 1912.
- Moment Musical—Portrait of Samuel Meyers (c.1913), unlocated, destroyed?
  - Samuel Meyers at the Piano (undated), University of Pennsylvania, Philadelphia, Pennsylvania, destroyed. Moment Musical and Samuel Meyers at the Piano may refer to the same painting.
- Self-Portrait (1915), University of Delaware, Newark, Delaware
- Posthumous Portrait of Dr. William H. Allen (c.1916), Girard College. Dr. Allen was president of Girard College, 1850-1862 and 1867–1882. Painted from a photograph.
- Posthumous Portrait of Dr. Adam H. Fetterolf (c.1916), Girard College. Dr. Fetterolf was president of Girard College, 1882–1910. Painted from a photograph.
- Portrait of Dr. James Cornelius Wilson (1917), College of Physicians of Philadelphia. Dr. Wilson was a professor at Jefferson Medical College.
- Portrait of Richard Mott Jones (c.1917), William Penn Charter School, Philadelphia, Pennsylvania. Jones was headmaster of Penn Charter, 1874–1917.
- Orientale—Portrait of Ruth St. Denis (c.1918), unlocated
- Portrait of Mrs. Edwin R. Linton, the Artist's Mother (by 1919), University of Pennsylvania, Philadelphia, Pennsylvania
- Portrait of Ada Forman in Her Javanese Palace Dance (1920), Delaware Art Museum, Wilmington, Delaware
- Portrait of Mayor Thomas B. Smith (c.1920), Philadelphia City Hall. Smith served as mayor of Philadelphia, 1916–1920.
- Portrait of President Warren G. Harding (1920s), St. Charles Borromeo Seminary, Overbrook, Pennsylvania
- Portrait of Cardinal Dennis Joseph Dougherty (c.1921), Cardinal Dougherty High School, Philadelphia, Pennsylvania. Dennis Joseph Dougherty served as Archbishop of Philadelphia, 1918–1951, and was elevated to Cardinal in 1921.
- Portrait of Professor Herbert Spencer Jennings (1921), Johns Hopkins University, Baltimore, Maryland
- Portrait of General John J. Pershing (1921), Les Invalides, Paris, France. General Pershing was Commander of American Expeditionary Forces during World War I.
- Portrait of Admiral William S. Benson (c.1921). Admiral Benson was Chief of Naval Operations during World War I.
- The Silver Heel: Portrait of Agnes Allen (1923), Pennsylvania Academy of the Fine Arts, Philadelphia, Pennsylvania
- Portrait of Mabel Linton Williams (1924), Corcoran Gallery of Art, Washington, D.C. Williams was a concert pianist and the artist's cousin.
- Portrait of Bianca Saroya as Floria Tosca (c.1926), unlocated. Saroya was an operatic soprano. Possibly painted as a prop for a 1926 Philadelphia production of Tosca.
- Self-Portrait (c.1935), Pennsylvania Academy of the Fine Arts, Philadelphia, Pennsylvania
- Portrait of Senator Daniel Oren Hastings (1939), Delaware State Capitol, Dover, Delaware
- Portrait of James Cowart (undated), University of Pennsylvania, Philadelphia, Pennsylvania
- Portrait of David Ross (undated), University of Pennsylvania, Philadelphia, Pennsylvania
- Portrait of Mrs. John Partenheimer (undated), University of Pennsylvania, Philadelphia, Pennsylvania

=== Figure works ===
- Pickling Gherkins (c.1893–96), inscribed "F. B. A. Linton, Paris." Sold at Freeman's Auction, Philadelphia, 10 December 2000, Lot 114.
- Christ Being Raised from the Dead (c.1895), Academie Julien, Paris, France. Exhibited at PAFA, 1895.
- An Evening's Reminiscence (1901). Exhibited at the 1904 World's Fair in St. Louis. Sold at Freeman's Auction, Philadelphia, 10 December 2000, Lot 115. Sold at Morphy Auctions, 25 August 2009, Lot 2102.
- The Last Touch (Le Denière Retouche) (1922), Musée du Luxembourg, Paris, France. Awarded a bronze medal at the 1927 Salon Nationale in Paris.
- Italian Girl (undated), University of Delaware, Newark, Delaware
- Seated Country Girl (undated), University of Delaware, Newark, Delaware
- Veiled Lady (undated), University of Pennsylvania, Philadelphia, Pennsylvania
- The Romance of Salome (undated), University of Pennsylvania, Philadelphia, Pennsylvania
- Untitled (Italian Woman) (undated), The Illustrated Gallery, Fort Washington, Pennsylvania.

=== Other works ===
- A Case of Miniatures (c.1905). Exhibited at PAFA, 1905.
- Cows in Front of a Barn (undated)
