= Paula Winokur =

American artist (1936–2018)

Paula Colton Winokur
- Born: Paula Colton; May 1935; Philadelphia, Pennsylvania, U.S.
- Died: February 4, 2018 (age 82)
- Education: Tyler School of Art
- Known for: ceramics

Paula Colton Winokur (May 1935 – February 4, 2018) was an American artist. She was one of the leading ceramic artists in the United States from the 1970s until her death in 2018.

== Early life and education ==
Paula Colton was born and raised in Philadelphia. She graduated from Tyler School of Art, where she was a student of Rudolf Staffel, and where she met her future husband.

== Career ==
Winokur is best known for the work she made during the 1990s through the 2010s, "subtle, sophisticated, and sometimes gargantuan" porcelains that often had an environmental focus. "My feeling is I want to make this work and bring it into the gallery and have people say, 'oh yeah, I should think about that.' That's my hope" she said in 2014.

In 2004, critic David C. Farmer described her show in Honolulu as "a memory of dreamscapes brimming with pulsating, organic energies", and compared one work "Segments Erraticus" (1999) to dinosaur vertebrae and "an elongated geode". "Winokur's stark white pieces – some wall-mounted and others set on the floor – evoke the stark beautiful landscapes of the southwestern United States, and, for contrast, Alaskan glaciers," wrote critic Edward Sozanski in 2006, adding that the works "evoke an evolutionary history" and "address the current concerns of global warming and environmental spoliation".

Winokur established the ceramics department and taught ceramic art at Arcadia University (formally known as Beaver College), in Glenside, Pennsylvania from the 1970s until the 2000s. She won an NEA Craftsman's Fellowship in 1976. In 2002 she was elected to the College of Fellows at the American Craft Council. She was Arcadia's Professor of the Year in 2003.

== Personal life ==
Colton married fellow ceramic artist and teacher Robert Winokur. They lived in Denton, Texas, in the 1960s, and had two sons. She died in 2018, at the age of 82.

== Collections ==
- Renwick Gallery, Smithsonian American Art Museum
- Philadelphia Museum of Art

== Exhibitions ==
- Andrews Gallery, College of William & Mary, 1980
- Cheltenham Art Centre Craft Festival, 1984
- "Transcending Memory" Contemporary Museum, 2004
- "Geological Sites", Acadia University, 2006
- Material Legacy, Philadelphia Art Alliance, 2015
- Fellowship in Clay, The Clay Studio, 2015
- Watershed Center for the Ceramic Arts, University of Maine, 2017
- "Paula Winokur: A Tribute" The Clay Studio, 2019
