= Lila Oliver Asher =

American artist (1921–2021)

- Born: November 15, 1921; Philadelphia, Pennsylvania
- Died: February 11, 2021 (aged 99)
- Education: Fleischer Art Memorial, 1933–1938, Frank B. A. Linton, 1938–1942
- Spouses: Sydney S. Asher (died) Kenneth P. Crawford (died)
- Children: Warren Oliver Asher (deceased), Bonnie Asher

Lila Oliver Asher (November 15, 1921 – February 11, 2021) was an American artist and printmaker. She is best known for her printmaking, primarily with linocut and woodcut, and her subjects spanned from religious themes, myths, musicians, and mothers. Asher also explored a variety of mediums including watercolor, sculpture, drawing, portraiture, wrought iron, murals, stained glass windows, and published book about her experiences as an artist in World War II. She explored these themes and mediums over the expanse of her long career as they connected with her experiences in life.

== Life ==
=== Early years ===
Lila was born Lila Estelle Oliver on November 15, 1921, in Philadelphia, Pennsylvania. She started drawing as a child and received her first set of oil paints as a birthday gift from her parents when she was seven. At the age of 12, Lila began studying with Joseph Grossman and started painting lessons with Frank B. A. Linton, a protégé of Thomas Eakins while attending classes at Fleischer Art Memorial from 1933 to 1938. She was also a pupil of Prof. Gonippo Raggi and held a four-year scholarship to the now University of the Arts. She attended in 1943, during World War II, where the skills and abilities she showed with sketching would lead to the job of sketching soldiers at military hospitals and Stage Door Canteens through the USO. These portraits would then be sent to the soldiers' loved ones back home and sometimes were even used by plastic surgeons in reconstructing faces disfigured by combat wounds. Asher was an unconventional volunteer for the USO Program having been an artist, but made the important and unique contribution of approximately 3,600 keepsake portraits for soldiers and their families.

=== Middle years ===
After the war, in 1946, Asher moved to Washington, D.C., to establish her studio where she created advertisements, sculptures, paintings, and prints. To supplement her art, she took illustration jobs advertising for Charles Schwartz Jewelers and upscale men’s clothiers Lewis & Thos. Saltz. In 1947 she started as an instructor for Howard University in their Art Department and was there until 1951. She then taught at Wilson Teachers College from 1953 to 1954 before returning to Howard University in 1961. In 1964 she was promoted to Assistant Professor, Associate Professor in 1966, and full Professor in 1971.

=== Later years ===
In a 1987 newspaper, The Hilltop (a Howard University newspaper), it was pointed out that “Asher has had more than 27 one-person shows in cities throughout the nation, and has had shows in India, Iran, Turkey, and Japan”. Since 1991 she had been Professor Emerita and continued to work in her studio before her death in 2021. One of Asher's later solo exhibits, in 2013, showed a collection of her works within many mediums and was called "A Life With Line".

=== Death and relatives ===
Asher died of complications from surgery for a perforated ulcer on February 11, 2021, at a care center in Washington at the age of 99.

The Washington Post said in Asher's obituary, "She is best known for her prints in permanent collections at the Smithsonian American Art Museum, universities, embassies, and many private collections in the US and abroad." Her first husband, Sydney Asher, died in 1974 at the age of 62 of a heart attack. She was survived by a daughter, Bonnie Asher. Her son Warren Oliver Asher has also passed. Her second husband Kenneth Crawford, who Asher married in 1978, died of cardiac arrest in 2006 at the age of 86.

== Works ==
=== Men I Have Met In Bed ===
In addition to Asher's artwork, she wrote a book about the experiences she had while volunteering for the USO and making portraits for soldiers. Her book, Men I Have Met In Bed, (Heritage Books) consists of the stories of servicemen she encountered in hospitals she would travel to and spend a week at. One of Asher's sketches from her time sketching servicemen has been featured in the magazine On Patrol in 2012. This specific issue is on women in the military with the cover highlighting a sketch from Asher of a servicewoman in a wheelchair. Asher even describes her book as "a patchwork of stories about the many soldiers and sailors who came back from World War II less than whole".

In addition, the Online Archive of California (OAC) has a collection that “contains personal correspondence to and from Lila Oliver Asher, as well as sketches done by Asher, military realia, and a series of thank you letters to Asher."

== Career achievements ==
=== Permanent collections ===
- Nat. Museum of American Art, Wash. D.C.
- Corcoran Gallery of Art, Wash. D.C.
- Howard Univ. Gallery of Art, Wash., D.C.
- Barnett Aden Collection, Tampa, Fla.
- Univ. of Virginia, Charlottesville, Va.
- Sweet Briar College, Sweet Briar, Va.
- B'nai B'rith, Wash. D.C.
- City of Wolfsburg, Germany
- David Lloyd Kreeger Collection, Wash. D.C.
- Superior Court of the Dist. of Columbia, Wash., D.C.
- Federal Mediation and Conciliation Serv., Wash., D.C.
- Center for Research in Education of the Disadvantaged, Jerusalem, Israel
- Embassy of the U.S., Tel Aviv, Israel
- Embassy of the U.S., Mexico City, Mexico
- Fisk Univ., Nashville, Tenn.
- Montgomery County Collection of Contemporary Prints, Montgomery County, Md.
- Nat. Council on Art in Jewish Life; American Jewish Congress, New York, N.Y.
- Georgetown Univ., Wash., D.C.
- Nat. Mus. of History, Taipei, Taiwan
- Kastrupgårdsamlingen Kunst Museum, Denmark
- Nat. Museum of Women in the Arts, Wash. D.C.
- Jundt Museum, Gonzaga Univ. Spokane, Wash.

In addition to these permanent collections Asher's work is also in private collections in the U.S. and abroad.

=== Solo exhibitions ===
- 1951 - Barnett Aden Gallery, Wash., D.C.
- 1955 - William C. Blood Gallery, Phila., Pa.
- 1957 - Arts Club, Wash., D.C.
- 1959 - Collectors Gallery, Wash., D.C.
- 1960 - Garrett Park Public Library, Garrett Park, Md.
- 1963 - Burr Galleries, New York, N.Y.
- 1965 - Gallery Two Twenty Two, El Paso, Tex.
- 1968 - Thomson Gallery, New York, N.Y.
- 1969 - B'nai B'rith Headquarters, Wash., D.C.
- 1970 - Univ. of Virginia, Charlottesville, Va.
- 1972 - Green-Field Gallery, El Paso, Tex.
- 1972 - Northwestern Michigan College
- 1972 - Franz Bader Gallery, retrospective, Wash., D.C.
- 1973 - American Club, Tokyo, Japan
- 1974 - USIS Bombay, India
- 1974 - Iran-America Soc., Teheran, Iran
- 1974 - Fisk Univ., retrospective, Nashville, Tenn.
- 1975 - USIS Calcutta, Bombay and Madras, India
- 1975 - USIS Karachi, Lahore, and Islamabad, Pakistan
- 1976 - USIS Ankara and Adana, Turkey
- 1976 - Via Gambaro Gallery, Wash., D.C.
- 1978 - Gallery Kormendy, Alexandria, Va.
- 1978 - Howard Univ., retrospective
- 1979 - Washington Hebrew Cong., Wash., D.C.
- 1980 - Northeastern Univ., Boston, Mass.
- 1982 - Nat. Museum of History, Taipei, Taiwan
- 1982 - Kastrupgårdsamlingen Kunst Museum, Denmark
- 1985 - Gallaudet Univ. Wash., D.C.
- 1986 - Mickelson Gallery, Wash., D.C.
- 1986 - UCLA, Los Angeles, Cal.
- 1987 - National Press Club, Washington., DC
- 1988 - Univ. of Virginia, Charlottesville, Va.
- 1991 - Howard Univ. Retrospective, Wash. D.C.
- 1992 - Cosmos Club, Wash., D.C.
- 1992 - Rockville Art Mansion, Rockville, Md.
- 1992 - Georgetown Univ. Wash., D.C
- 1992 - Hood College, Frederick, Md.
- 1993 - Nat. Institutes of Health, Bethesda, Md.
- 1997 - Goldman Gallery
- 1997 - Jewish Community Center
- 1998 - Cosmos Club, Washington, D.C.
- 1999 - Montpelier Cultural Arts Center, Prince George's County, Md.
- 2001 - Strathmore Hall Arts Center, North Bethesda, Md.
- 2009 - Henry J. Stimson Center (Institute for International Peace and Security) Washington, D.C.
- 2010 - Ratner Museum, Bethesda, Md.
- 2010 - The Washington Arts Club, Washington, D.C.
- 2011 - The Printmakers Gallery, Silver Spring Md.
- 2012 - "American Impressions" contemporary printmaking exchange Shanghai, China
- 2013 - Washington Printmakers Gallery, Washington, D.C.

=== Group exhibitions ===
- Pennsylvania Academy of Fine Arts, Phila, Pa.
- Corcoran Gallery of Art, Wash., D.C.
- Howard Univ., Wash., D.C.
- Pan American Union, Wash., D.C.
- Library of Congress, Wash., D.C.
- Univ. of Maine, Orono, Me.
- Baltimore Mus. of Art, Baltimore, Md.
- Philadelphia College of Art, Phila., Pa.
- Riverside Mus., New York, N.Y.
- Arts Club, Wash., D.C.
- Rochester Mus. Memorial Art Gallery, Rochester, N.Y.
- Garden Pier, Atlantic City, N.J.
- Virginia Intermont College, Bristol, Va.
- Longwood College, Va.
- Rockville Civic Center, Rockville, Md.
- New York World Fair, New York, N.Y.
- U.S. Department of State, Wash., D.C.
- Univ. of Illinois Krammet Mus., Champaign, Ill.
- Woodmere Gallery, Phila., Pa.
- Nat. Collection of Fine Arts, Wash., D.C.
- Smithsonian Institution, Wash., D.C.
- Univ. of Virginia, Charlottesville, Va.
- Virginia Museum, Richmond, Va.
- Sweet Briar College, Sweetbriar, Va.
- Dimock Gallery, Geo. Washington Univ. Wash., D.C.
- Studio Museum, Harlem, New York, N.Y.
- Univ. of Texas, Auburn, Tex.
- Appalachian State Univ. N.C.
- Montgomery College, Montgomery County, Md.
- International Monetary Fund, Wash., D.C.
- Atlanta College of Art, Atlanta, Ga.
