= Art Students' League of Philadelphia =

Former art school in Philadelphia, Pennsylvania

Art Students' League of Philadelphia was a short-lived, co-operative art school formed in reaction to Thomas Eakins's February 1886 forced-resignation from the Pennsylvania Academy of the Fine Arts. Eakins taught without pay at ASL from February 1886 until the school's dissolution in early 1893.

== Loincloth incident ==
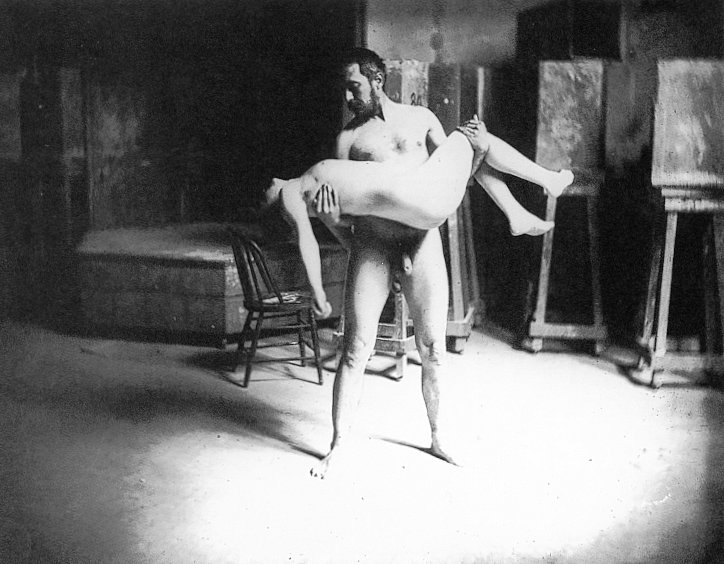
"Thomas Eakins nude, holding a nude female in his arms, looking down." (c.1885). Bregler cat. no. 348. This photograph was taken in the studios at PAFA.

In early January 1886, Eakins, director of the art school at the Pennsylvania Academy of the Fine Arts, had a male model remove his loincloth during an anatomy lecture in front of either an all-female or a mixed male-and-female class of students. This was contrary to PAFA policy, and Eakins was reprimanded in a January 11 letter by Director of Education Edward Hornor Coates. But the incident ignited controversy, including charges that Eakins had cavorted nude with his students, had manipulated them into posing nude for him or for each other, had photographed them nude, and that he did not possess the moral character to be a teacher at PAFA.

Over the next month, Eakins's brother-in-law and teaching assistant, Frank Stephens, became the most vituperative critic. Stephens accused Eakins of indecent behavior with his students and even having committed incest with his deceased sister, Margaret Eakins (died 1882). Stephens and his wife (Eakins's sister Caddy) were living with her father at 1729 Mount Vernon Street. Eakins had married Susan Macdowell in January 1884, and they were living in his studio at 1330 Chestnut Street. The surviving documentation contains no accusation of homosexual activity by Eakins. Although another brother-in-law, lawyer Will Crowell, raised the possibility that Stephens himself had engaged in homosexual activity, and suggested that the threat of exposure could be used to silence him, "if he is not stark mad."

The incident and accusations against Eakins occurred at a time when PAFA was facing financial challenges, and a new opportunity. PAFA had ended 1885 with a $6,000 deficit. In January 1886, the Estate of Joseph E. Temple proposed to contribute $25,000 toward establishing an endowment for the museum/school, with the condition that PAFA raise an additional $75,000 within three years.

=== Resignation ===
Coates wrote to Eakins on February 8, requesting that he resign; Eakins submitted a one-sentence resignation the following day. Eakins continued to protest his innocence, and met with Coates on February 13. Coates presented the charges to PAFA's Board of Directors at a meeting that night, and the Board voted to accept Eakins's resignation. Eakins wrote to Coates on February 15:

Was ever so much smoke for so little fire? I never in my life seduced a girl, nor tried to, but what else can people think of all this rage and insanity. It is not a rare ambition in a painter to want to make good pupils. My dear master Gerome who loved me had the same ambition, helped me always and has to this day interested himself in all I am doing. My figures at least are not a bunch of clothes with a head and hands sticking out but more nearly resemble the strong living bodies than most pictures show. And in the latter end of a life so spent in study, you at least can imagine that painting is with me a very serious study. That I have but little patience with the false modesty which is the greatest enemy to all figure painting. I see no impropriety in looking at the most beautiful of Nature's works, the naked figure. If there is impropriety, then just where does such impropriety begin? Is it wrong to look at a picture of a naked figure or at a statue? English ladies of the last generation thought so and avoided the statue galleries, but do so no longer. Or is it a question of sex? Should men make only the statues of men to be looked at by men, while the statues of women should be made by women to be looked at by women only? Should the he-painters draw the horses and bulls, and the she-painters like Rosa Bonheur the mares and cows? Must the poor old male body in the dissecting room be mutilated before Miss Prudery can dabble in his guts? ... Such indignities anger me. Can not anyone see into what contemptible inconsistencies such follies all lead? And how dangerous they are? My conscience is clear, and my suffering is past.

Sympathy for Eakins built in the press, with multiple calls for him to be reinstated. Five PAFA instructors — Frank Stephens, Charles Stephens (Frank's first cousin), Colin Campbell Cooper, James P. Kelly, and Thomas Anshutz — wrote a joint letter to PAFA's Board appealing to it to make "an official statement" that "Mr. Eakins' dismissal was due to the abuse of his authority and not to the malice of his personal or professional enemies." The Board declined to do so. (Technically, the Board had not dismissed Eakins; it accepted his letter of resignation.) Eakins continued to teach at PAFA into March, and tried to appeal his departure for more than a year, but to no avail. A more conservative curriculum was adopted at PAFA, and Anshutz, Kelly, and Charles Stephens were all promoted.

=== Philadelphia Sketch Club ===
Anshutz and both Stephenses took their accusations to the Philadelphia Sketch Club: "We hereby charge Mr. Thom^{s} Eakins with conduct unworthy of a gentleman & discreditable to this organization & ask his expulsion from the club." A committee investigated, concluding that: "Eakins has used his position as an artist and his authority as a teacher to commit certain trespasses on common decency and good morals." His honorary membership in the club was revoked.

A front-page story in The Philadelphia Evening Item was headlined: "The End of Eakins," and a subsequent story asked, "does anyone imagine he [Eakins] will not sink into obscurity and leave the city?" Eakins's personal reputation was ruined, something from which he never totally recovered.

=== Protest ===
All fifty-five male PAFA students signed a February 15 petition threatening to withdraw from the school if Eakins was not reinstated. The female PAFA students also circulated a petition, that eighteen of the thirty signed. That evening, thirty-eight male students, led by George Reynolds, marched to Eakins's studio to show their support. Eakins had offered to teach them outside of PAFA, and they proposed forming their own school – The Art Students' League. But, "[o]nce the renegades fully understood they would be forgoing an education in the most respected and best outfitted art school in the country for a one-room studio without electricity and plumbing, only sixteen of the fifty-five who had signed the petition made good on their pledge to withdraw from the academy."

Those sixteen were: Albert W. Baker, Edward W. Boulton (ASL's second president), Charles Bregler, James J. Cinan, Charles Brinton Cox (ASL's first secretary), Eldon R. Crane, Alexander Duncan, Thomas J. Eagan, Charles F. Fewier, J. P. McQuaide, G. H. Merchant, Henry A. Nehmsmann, George Reynolds (ASL's first curator), Rudolph Spiel, James M. Wright, and August Zeller.

== School ==
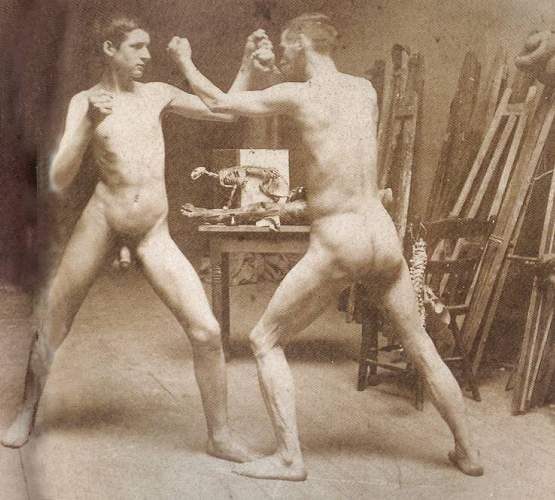
"James Wright and George Reynolds nude, boxing." (c.1886-88). This photograph was taken in the ASL studio at 1338 Chestnut Street.

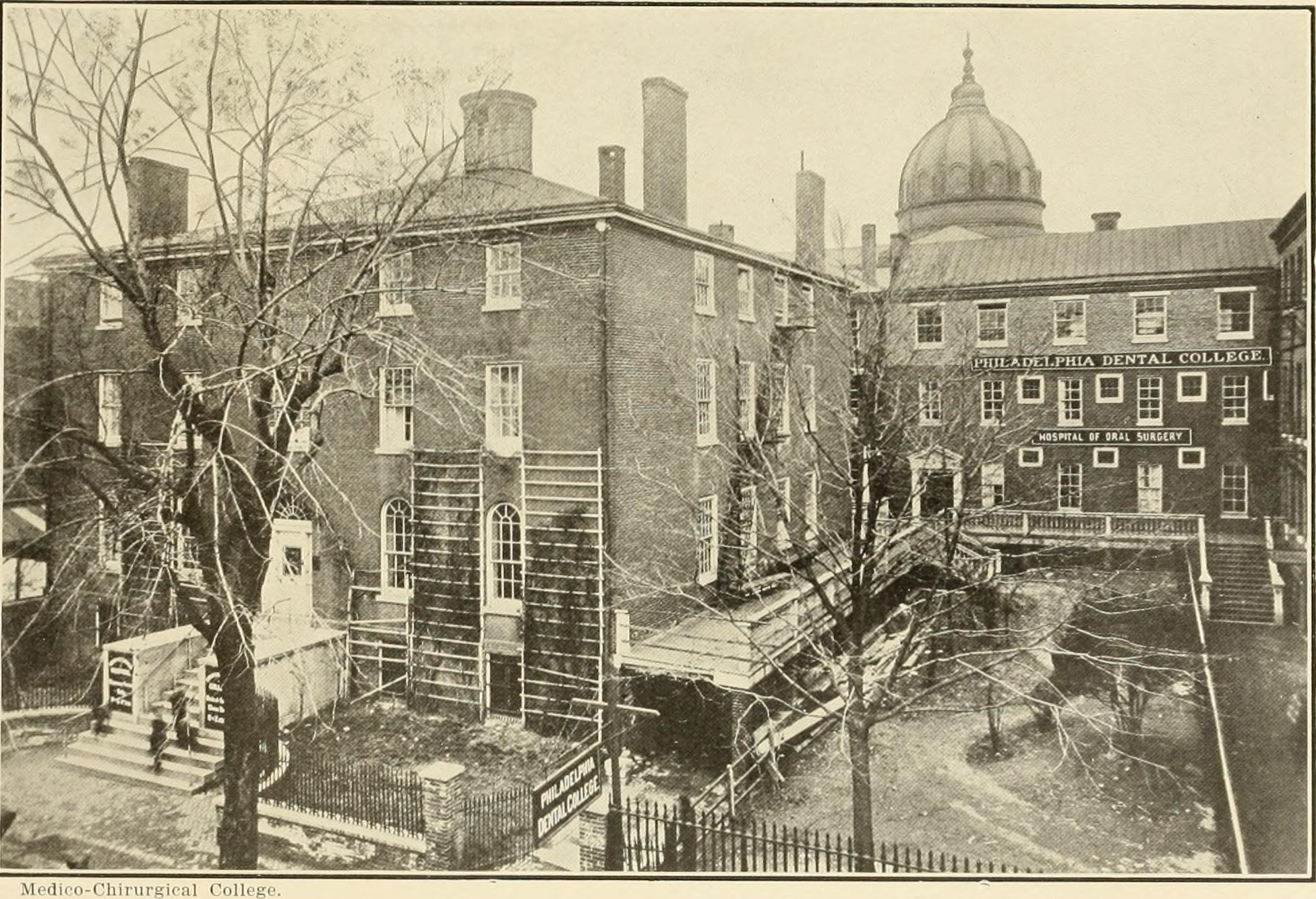
Philadelphia Dental College (right)

Temporary quarters at 1429 Market Street were secured, and "The League" held its first session on February 22, 1886, with about 30 students present. ASL's first president, H. T. Cresson, was quoted that day in a Philadelphia newspaper: "[T]he young men who have formed the Art Students' League ... desire to study THE ENTIRE NUDE FIGURE, not because it affords them pleasure to look at it, but because it is the only true way to obtain the necessary experience to represent a draped figure ..."

Subsequent students, some of whom may have been there that first night, included Cresson, Maurice Feely, Charles H. Fromuth, Douglass M. Hall, Lilian G. Hammitt, Frank B. A. Linton, Edwin George Lutz, Albert Oldach (ASL's third secretary), Edmond T. Quinn (ASL's third curator), Franklin L. Schenck (ASL's second curator), Amelia Van Buren, and Francis J. Ziegler (ASL's treasurer and second secretary). Charles Grafly, made the move to ASL, but returned to PAFA the following year, perhaps to be eligible for its traveling scholarships to Europe, one of which he was awarded in 1888. Seventeen-year-old Samuel Murray enrolled in ASL in Fall 1886, and eventually became Eakins's assistant and protégé.

Eakins set forth the school's purpose: "The Art Students' League of Philadelphia is an association formed for the study of painting and sculpture. The basis of study is the nude human figure." Tuition was initially set at $25, but it was raised to $40 for the 8-month 1886-87 season, and finally to $50. The school never had more than forty-one students, and sometimes had as few as twelve. "No antique or drawing classes were included; only painting and modelling from life. Eakins gave criticisms two mornings, one afternoon and one evening a week, delivered lectures on anatomy, perspective, and other subjects, and superintended the dissecting. For all this he refused to accept any salary during the years of the school's existence; indeed, he assisted some of the poorer students financially, often under the guise of paying them to pose for him."

ASL's first location was outgrown in only two months, and later demolished for Frank Furness's expansion of Broad Street Station. Its second location was at 1338 Chestnut Street (April 1886-May 1888), near Eakins's own studio at 1330. Its third location, 1816 Market Street (May 1888 – 1890), suffered a major fire, and its fourth and final location was at 12th & Filbert Street (1890–1893), above the Philadelphia Dental College.

The school was able to sustain itself into the 1890s, but lost passion as the students who had been personally involved in the battles moved on. In her biography of her father, sculptor Charles Grafly, art critic Dorothy Grafly Drummond wrote: “[T]he little band was fighting for its own bread and butter, at best thinly sliced and even more thinly spread. With time, tradition proved more strong than the rebellion against it.” Eventually, the school could not attract enough paying students to cover expenses, and it was dissolved in early 1893.

=== Teaching elsewhere ===
Eakins taught elsewhere, concurrent with the Art Students' League of Philadelphia, and subsequent to it: Art Students' League of New York, 1885–1888; Cooper Union in New York City, 1887–1897; National Academy of Design in New York City, 1888–1895; Art Students' League of Washington, D.C., 1893. Dismissed by Philadelphia's Drexel Institute in March 1895 for again using a fully nude male model before female students, Eakins gradually gave up teaching.

=== Bregler Collection ===
Much of what is known of the Art Students' League of Philadelphia comes from Charles Bregler, who was a student for the school's whole 7-year existence. He remained a lifelong friend to Eakins and his wife, and wrote two lengthy articles in the 1930s about Eakins's teaching methods. He preserved an enormous trove of Eakins papers, memorabilia, and minor works, although it was unavailable to scholars until the 1980s. The Bregler Collection was purchased by The Pew Charitable Trusts in 1985, and donated to the Pennsylvania Academy of the Fine Arts.

The Bregler Collection papers have changed the general perception of Eakins's departure from PAFA. It is now seen as less of a case of Victorian authority (PAFA's Board) persecuting a heroic iconoclast (Eakins), and more as a conspiracy by Eakins's colleagues and personal enemies to engineer his ouster from PAFA and deliberately sabotage his reputation.

== Eakins portraits of Art Students' League students ==
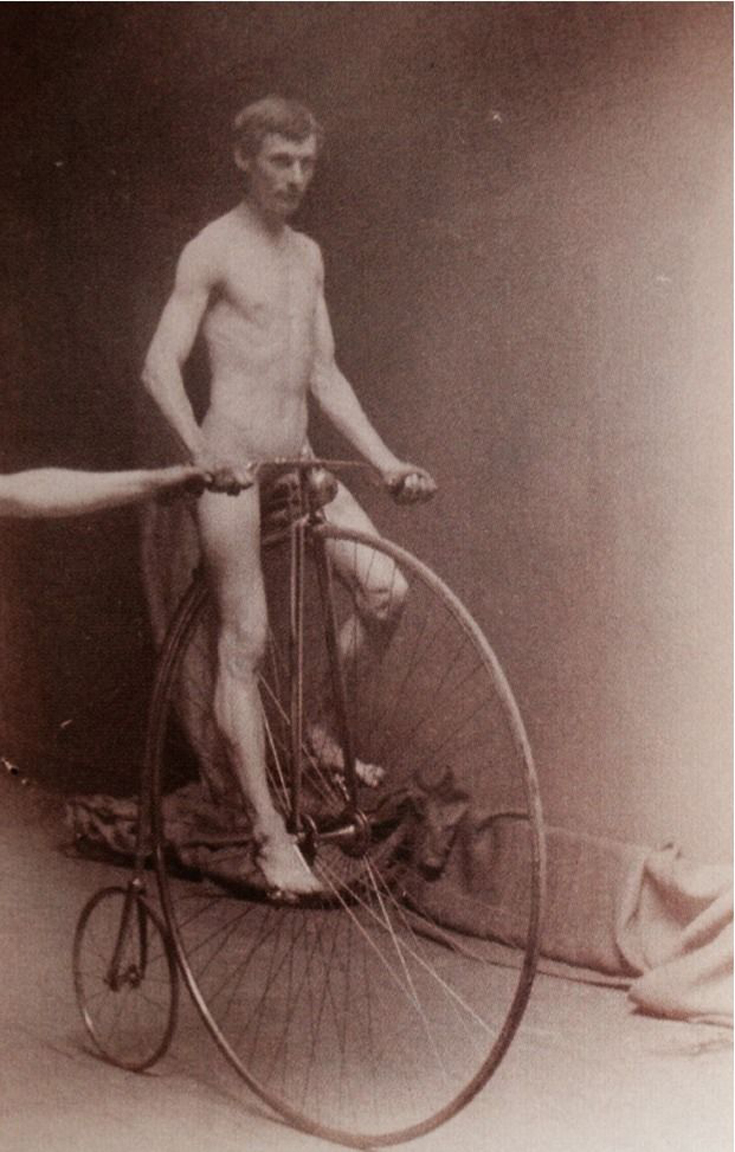
^{Sterling and Francine Clark Art Institute.}
Photograph of Charles Grafly on a High Wheel (1886). Grafly became a noted sculptor, and taught at PAFA from 1892 to his death in 1929. His works include the George Gordon Meade Memorial in Washington, D.C., and the Pioneer Mother Monument in San Francisco.

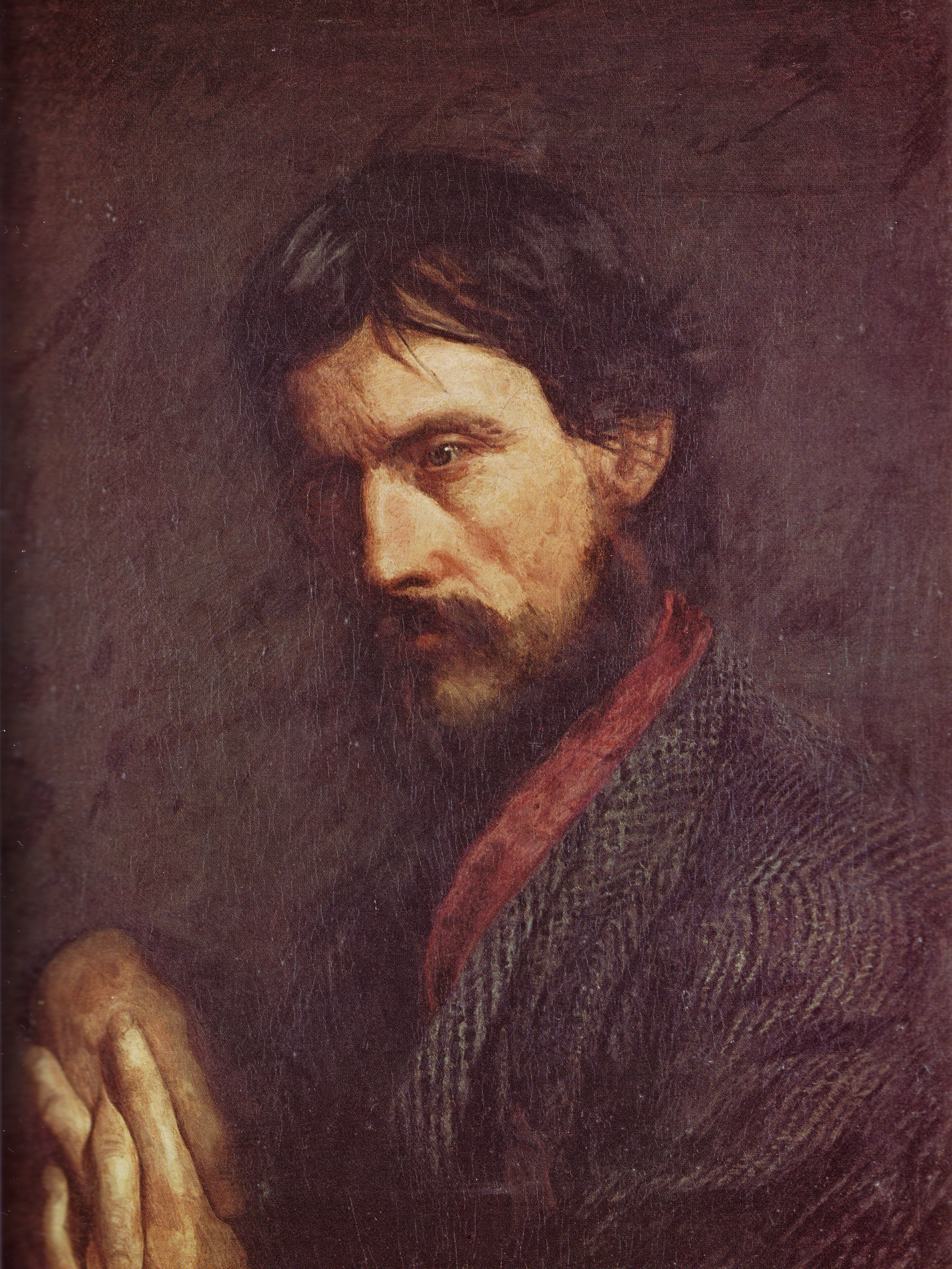
^{Yale University Art Gallery.}
The Veteran: Portrait of George Reynolds (c.1886). Irish-born. Civil War veteran, recipient of the Medal of Honor. Widower. Entered PAFA in 1882. The diver in Swimming. First curator of ASL. Became an illustrator. Died NYC, 1891 (age 52).

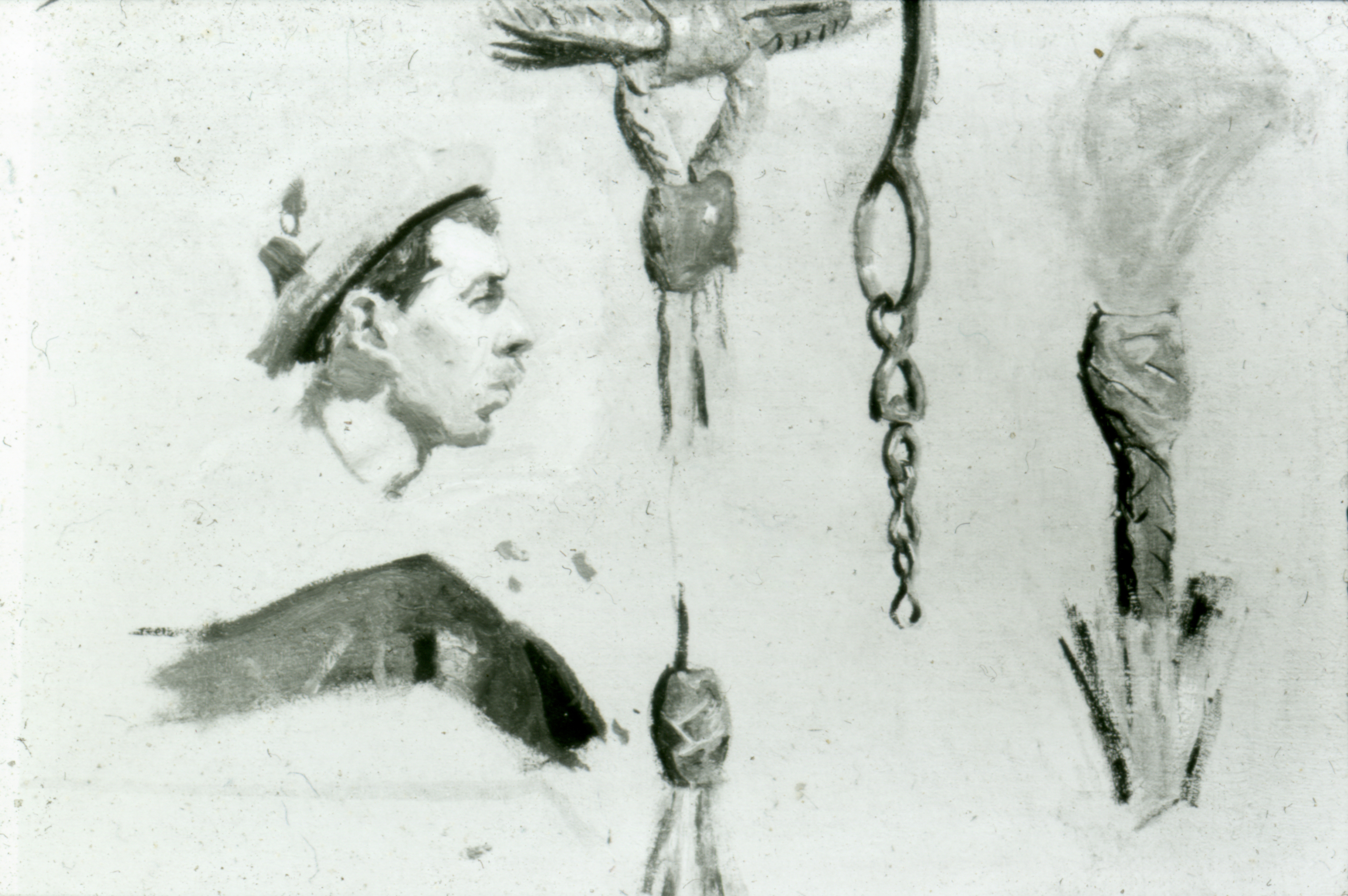
Sketch of Edward Boulton (c.1887). Former businessman. Entered PAFA in 18xx. Second president of ASL. Posed for Cowboys in the Badlands. Left ASL for Mexico. Eakins's oil portrait of Boulton was destroyed.

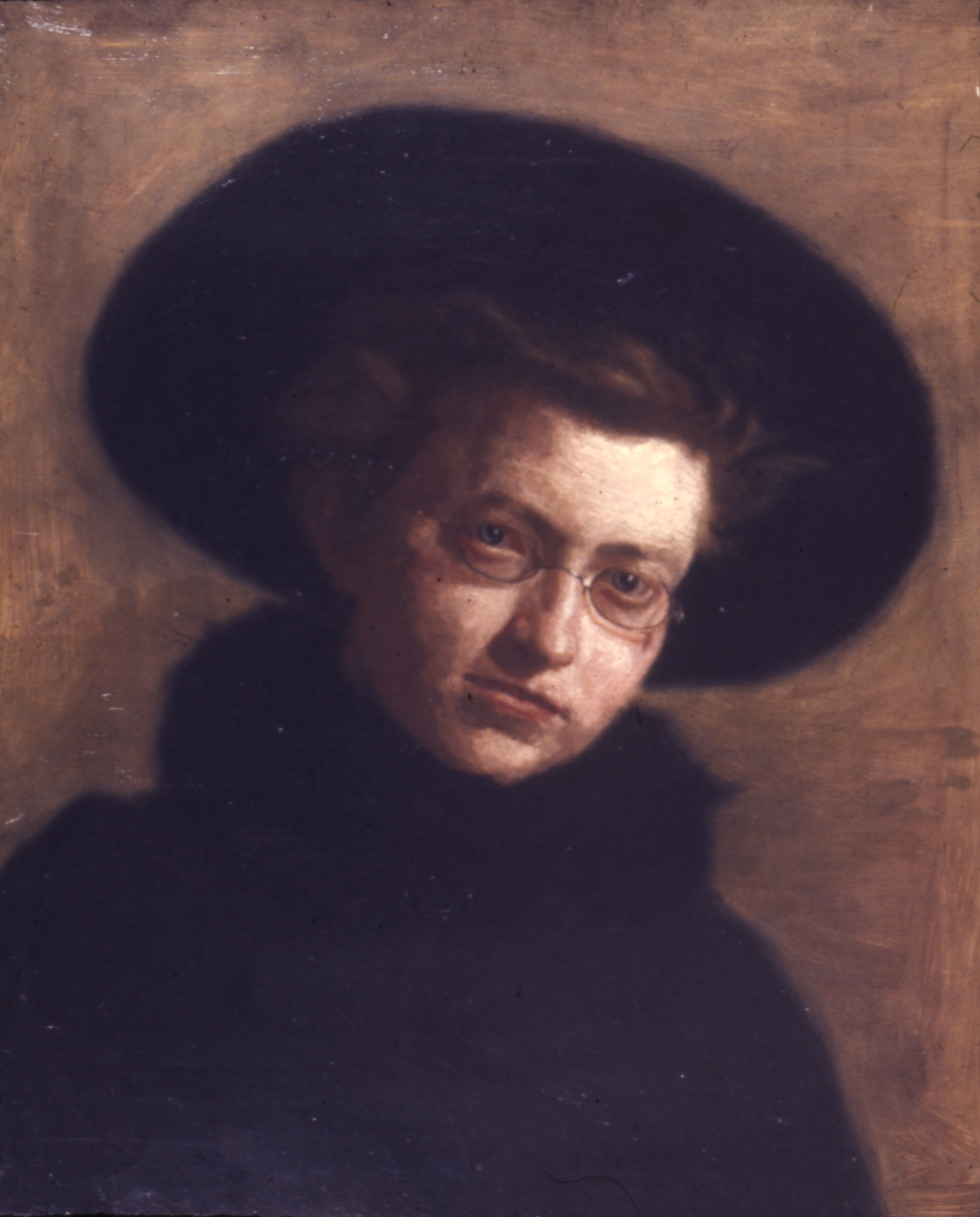
^{Hirshhorn Museum and Sculpture Garden.}
Girl in a Big Hat: Portrait of Lilian Hammitt (c.1888). From Alabama. Entered PAFA in 1883. ASL from 1886 to 1888. Fantasized about marrying Eakins. Committed to Norristown State Hospital, 1892. Released 1894, she was found walking the streets in a bathing suit and claiming to be "Mrs. Thomas Eakins." Recommitted.

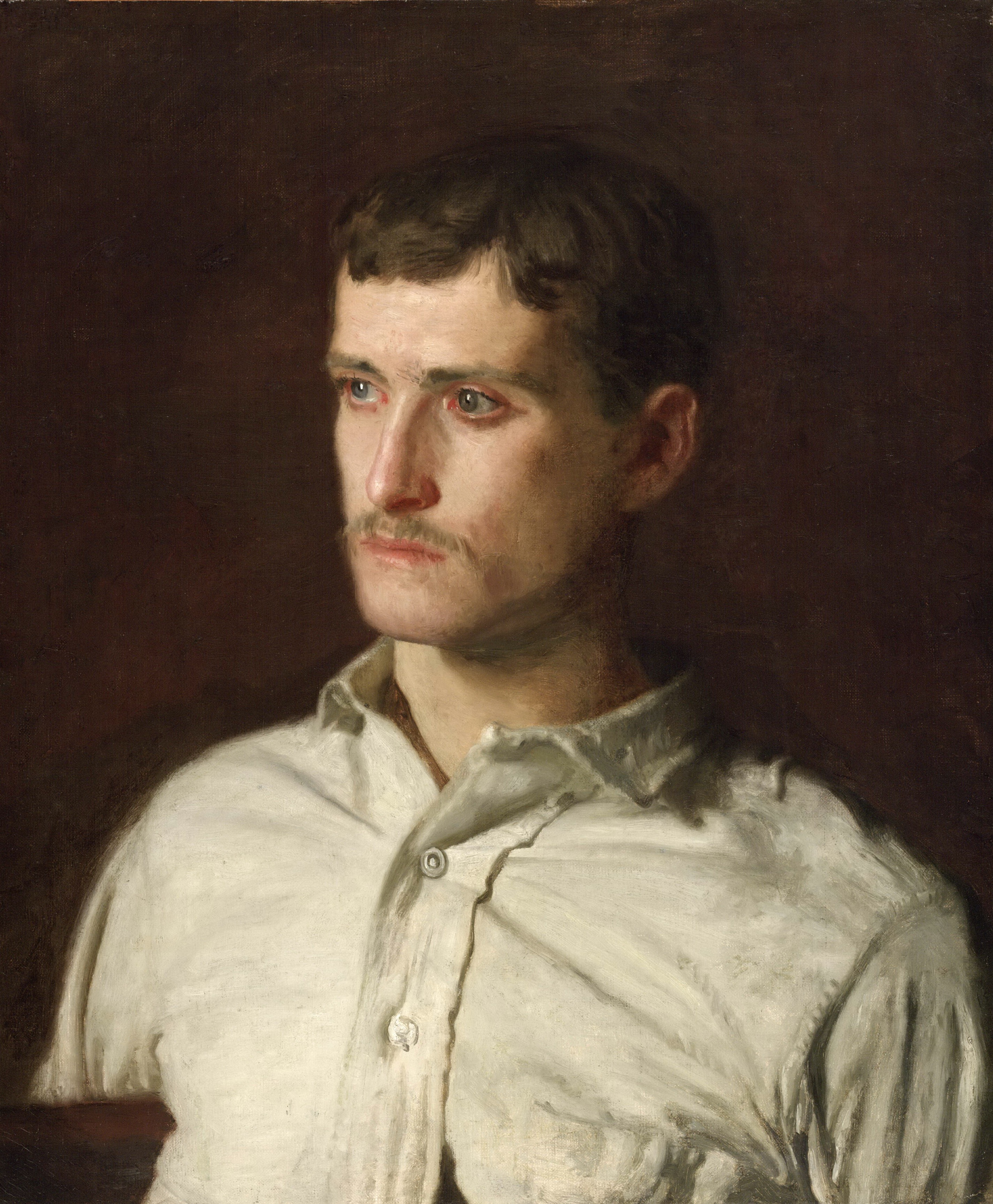
^{Philadelphia Museum of Art.}
Portrait of Douglass M. Hall (c.1888). From Philadelphia. Entered PAFA in 1885. ASL from 1887 to about 1890. Never pursued a professional art career. Died insane at Pennsylvania Hospital, 1912 (age 44), possibly from syphilis.

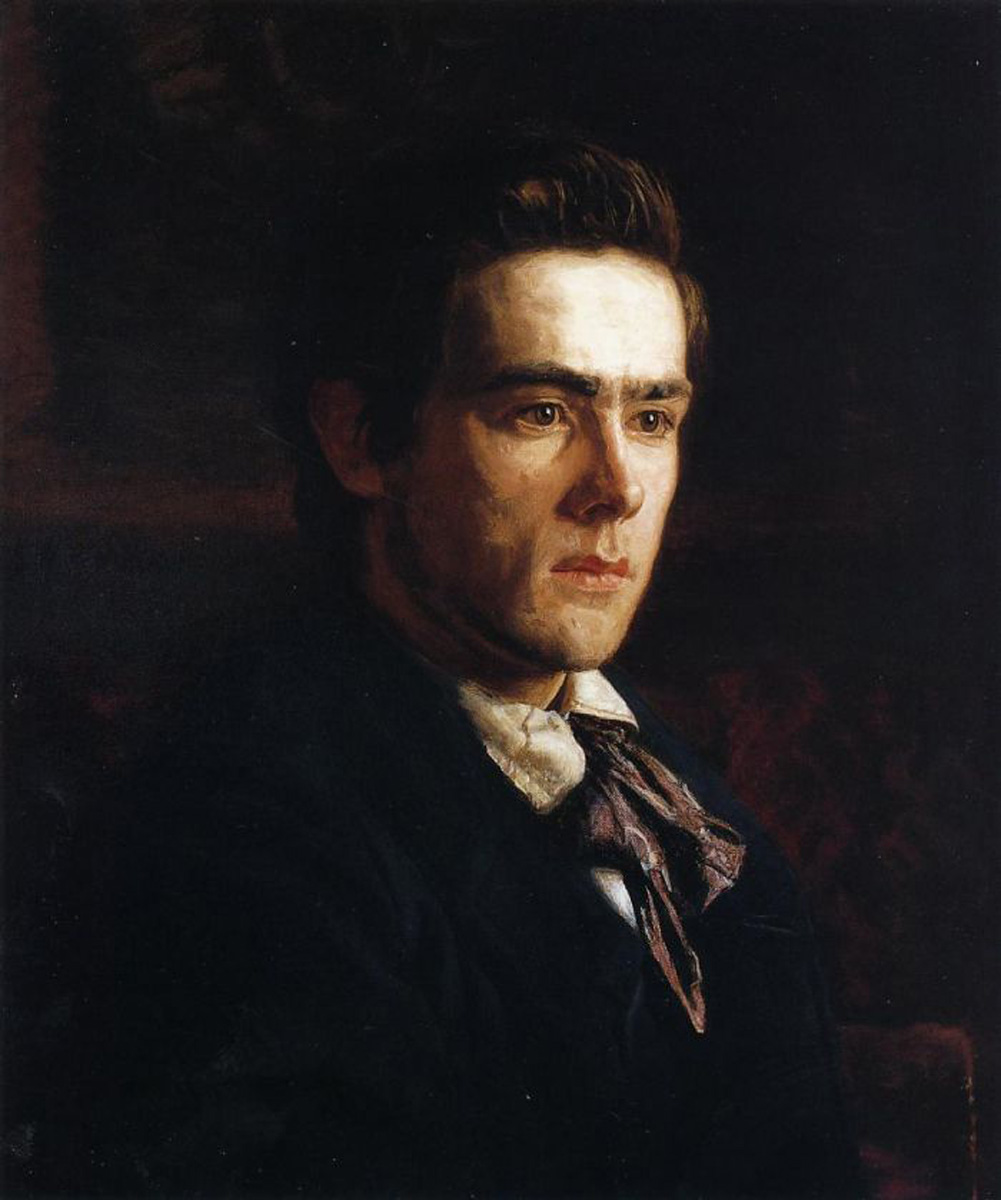
^{Mitchell Museum at Cedarhurst.}
Portrait of Samuel Murray (1889). From Philadelphia. ASL from 1886 to 1893. Assistant professor at ASL, 1892. Eakins's protégé and lifelong friend. Instructor at Philadelphia School of Design for Women, 1890-1941. Successful sculptor. Died Philadelphia, 1941 (age 72).

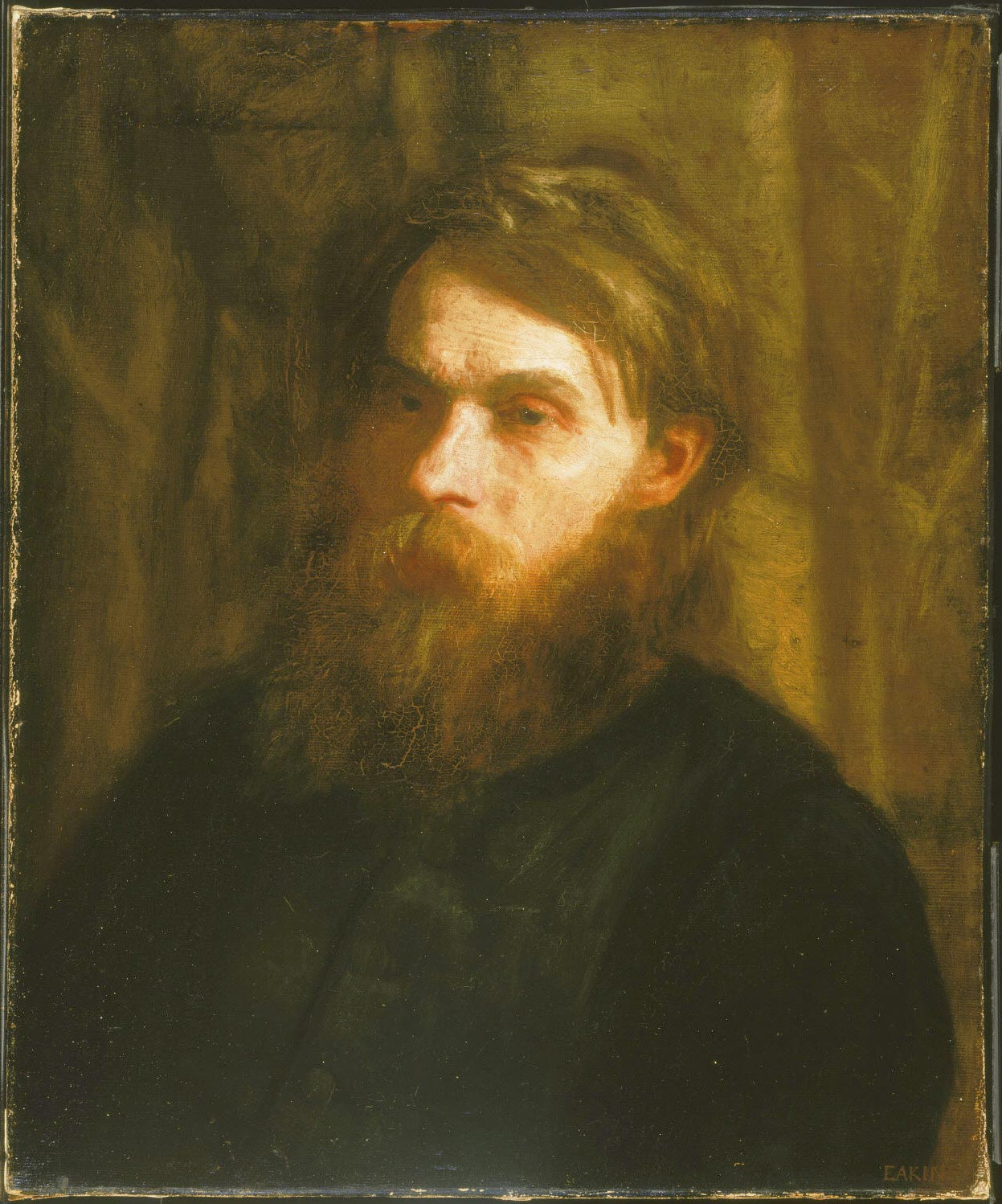
^{Philadelphia Museum of Art.}
The Bohemian: Portrait of Franklin Louis Schenck (c.1890). ASL from c.1888 to 1893. Second curator of ASL. Featured in 7 Eakins paintings. Moved to Brooklyn after ASL's failure. Settled in Northport, Long Island, painting romantic landscapes. Died 1926 (age 71).

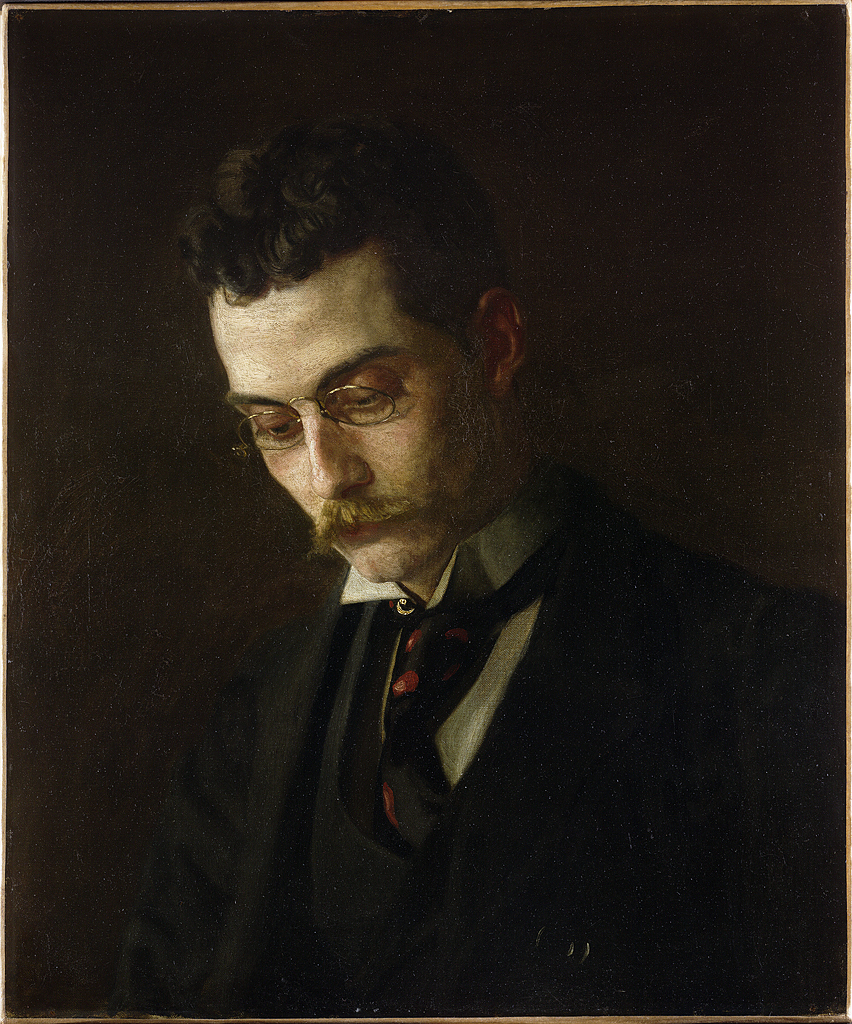
^{Fogg Art Museum, Harvard University.}
The Critic: Portrait of Francis J. Ziegler (c.1890). Entered PAFA in 18xx. Treasurer of ASL. Became a journalist and art critic. Translated plays. Eakins never forgave him for filing a newspaper report on the Lilian Hammitt scandal.

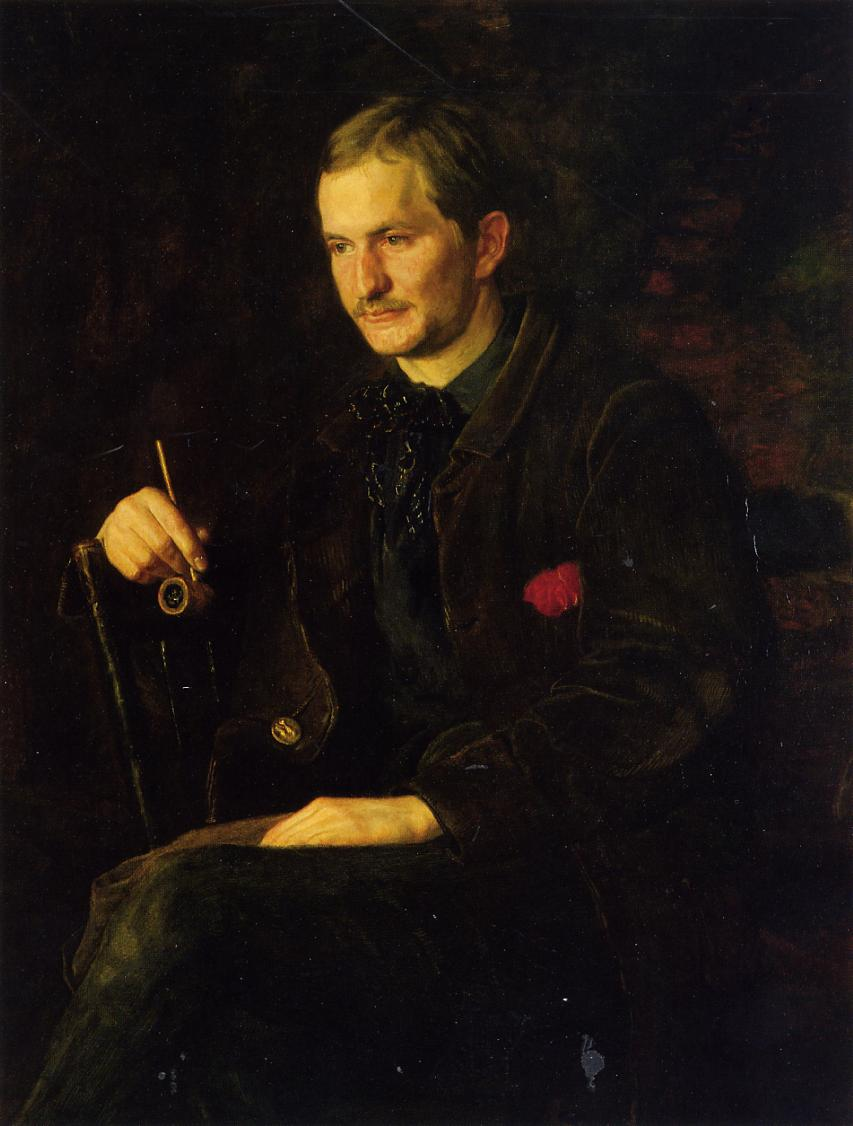
^{Crystal Bridges Museum of American Art.}
The Art Student: Portrait of James M. Wright (c.1890). Entered PAFA in 18xx. Moved to Brooklyn following ASL's failure. Became a businessman.

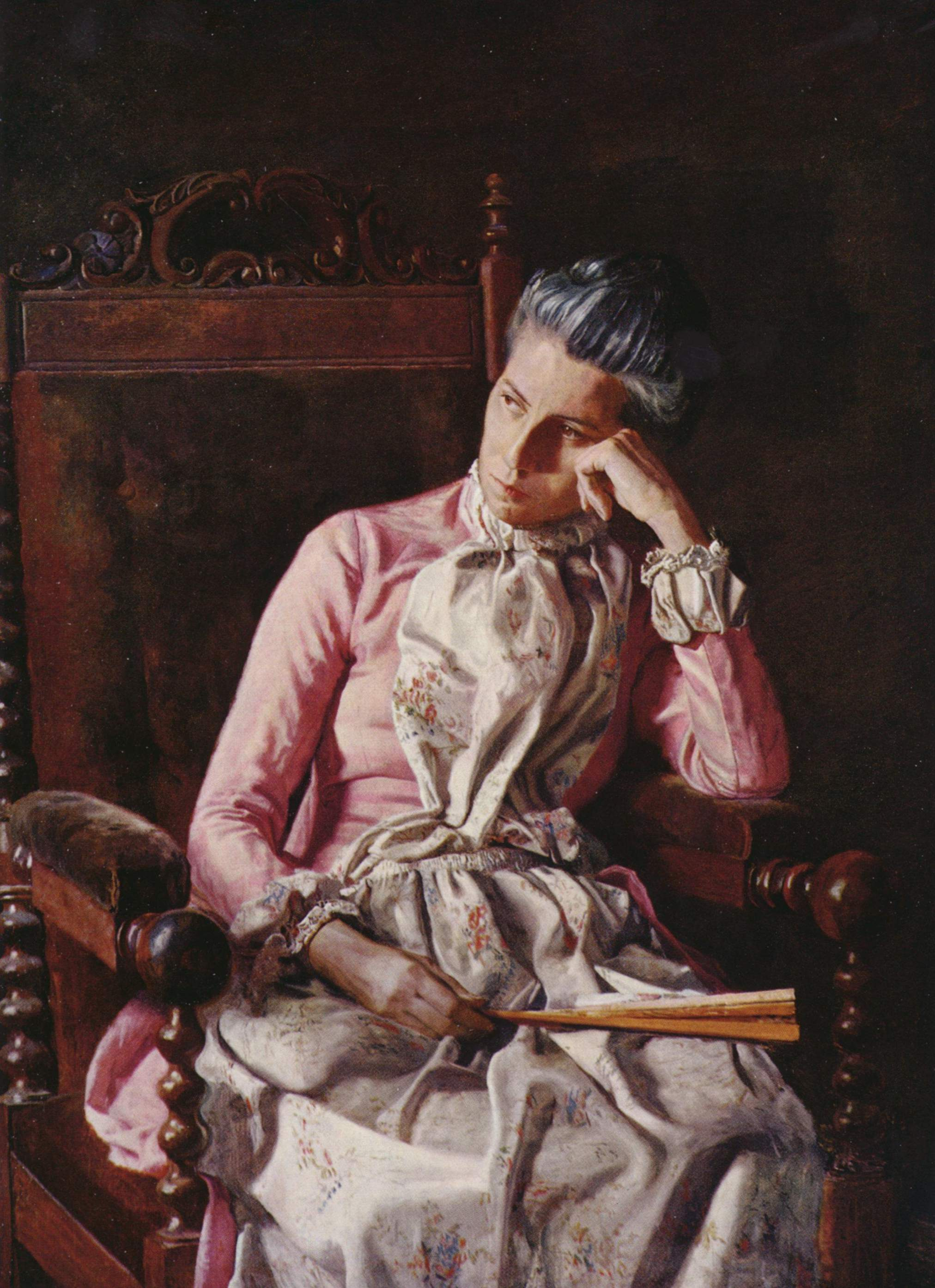
^{The Phillips Collection.}
Portrait of Amelia Van Buren (c.1891). From Detroit. Entered PAFA in 1884. Named in 1886 Eakins scandal (without her knowledge). Became a photographer. Died Tryon, NC, 1942 (age 86).

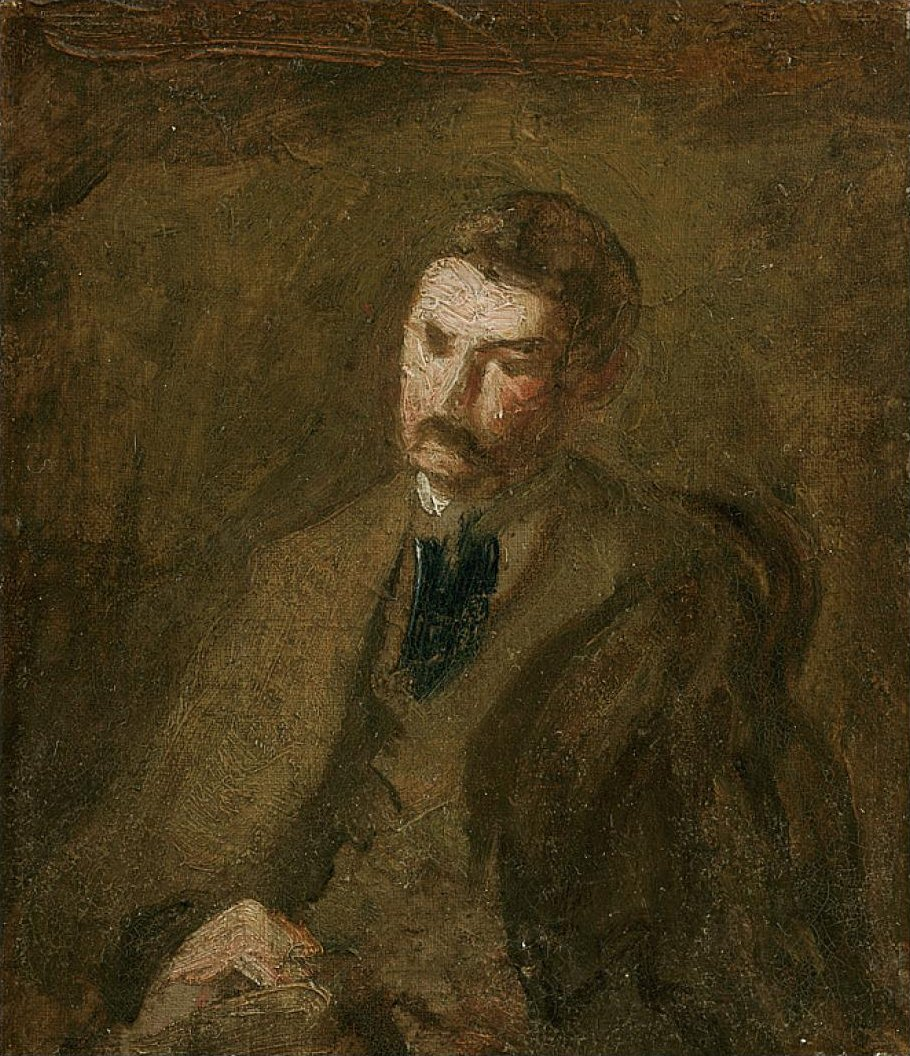
^{Johnson Museum of Art, Cornell University.}
Sketch of William L. MacLean (c.1895).

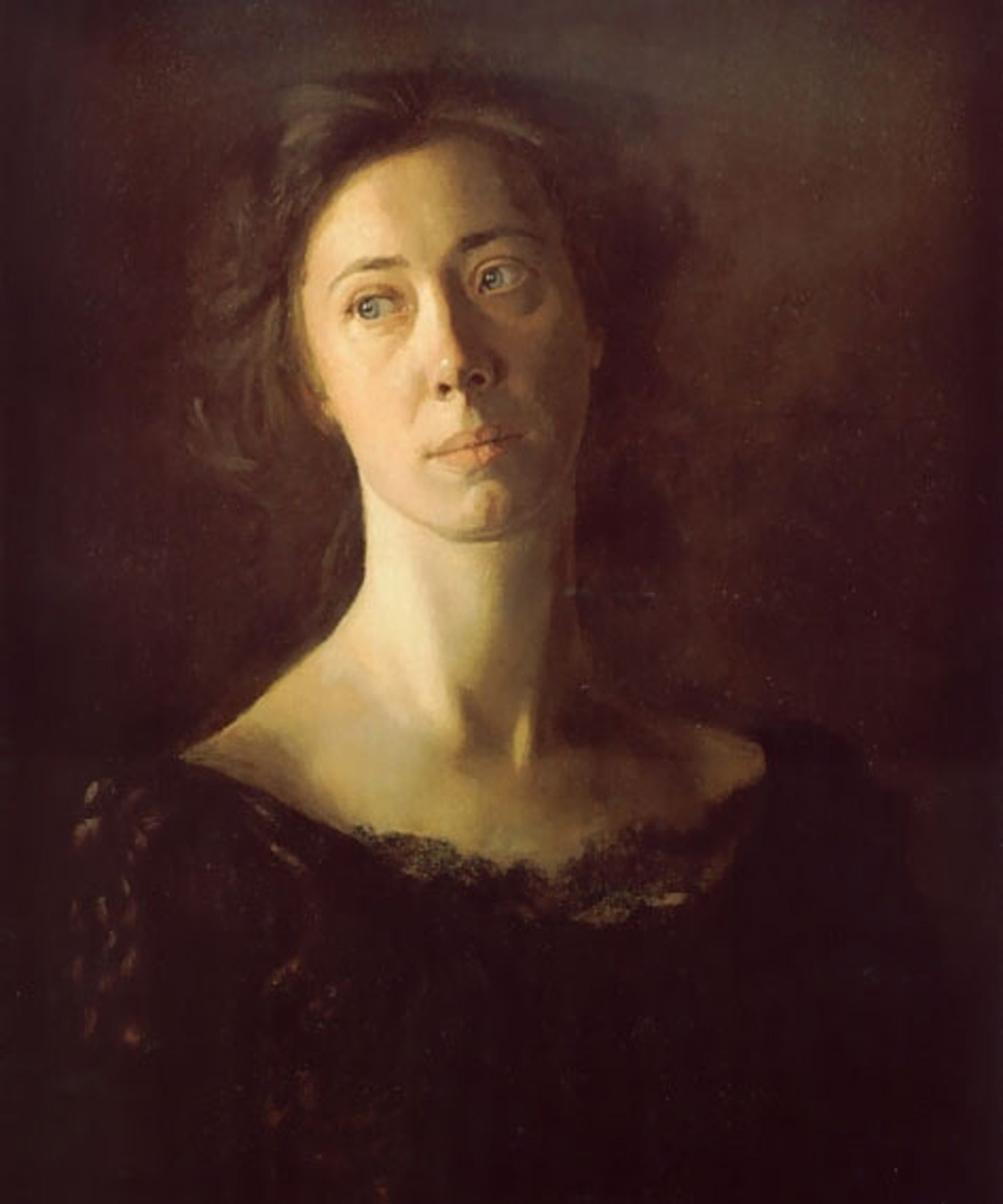
^{Musée d'Orsay.}
Clara: Portrait of Clara Janney Mather (c.1900). Philadelphia Quaker. Left ASL after deaths of both parents.

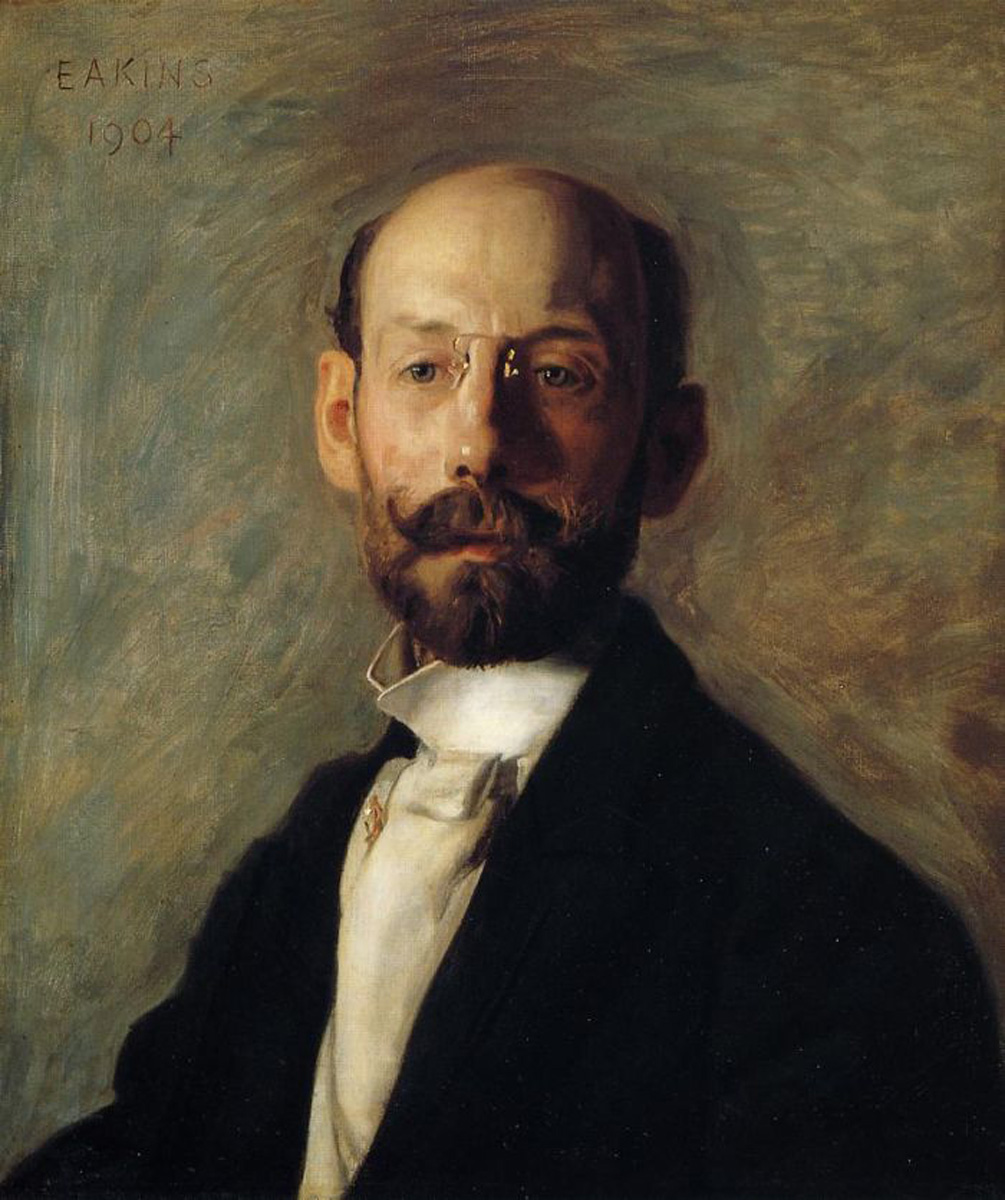
^{Hirshhorn Museum and Sculpture Garden.}
Portrait of Frank B. A. Linton (1904). Entered PAFA in 1885. ASL from 1888 to 1890. Studied at Ecole des Beaux-Arts under Gérôme and Bonnat. Became a successful portrait painter. Won a bronze medal at 1927 Paris Salon. One painting in Musée du Luxembourg. Died Philadelphia, 1943 (age 72).

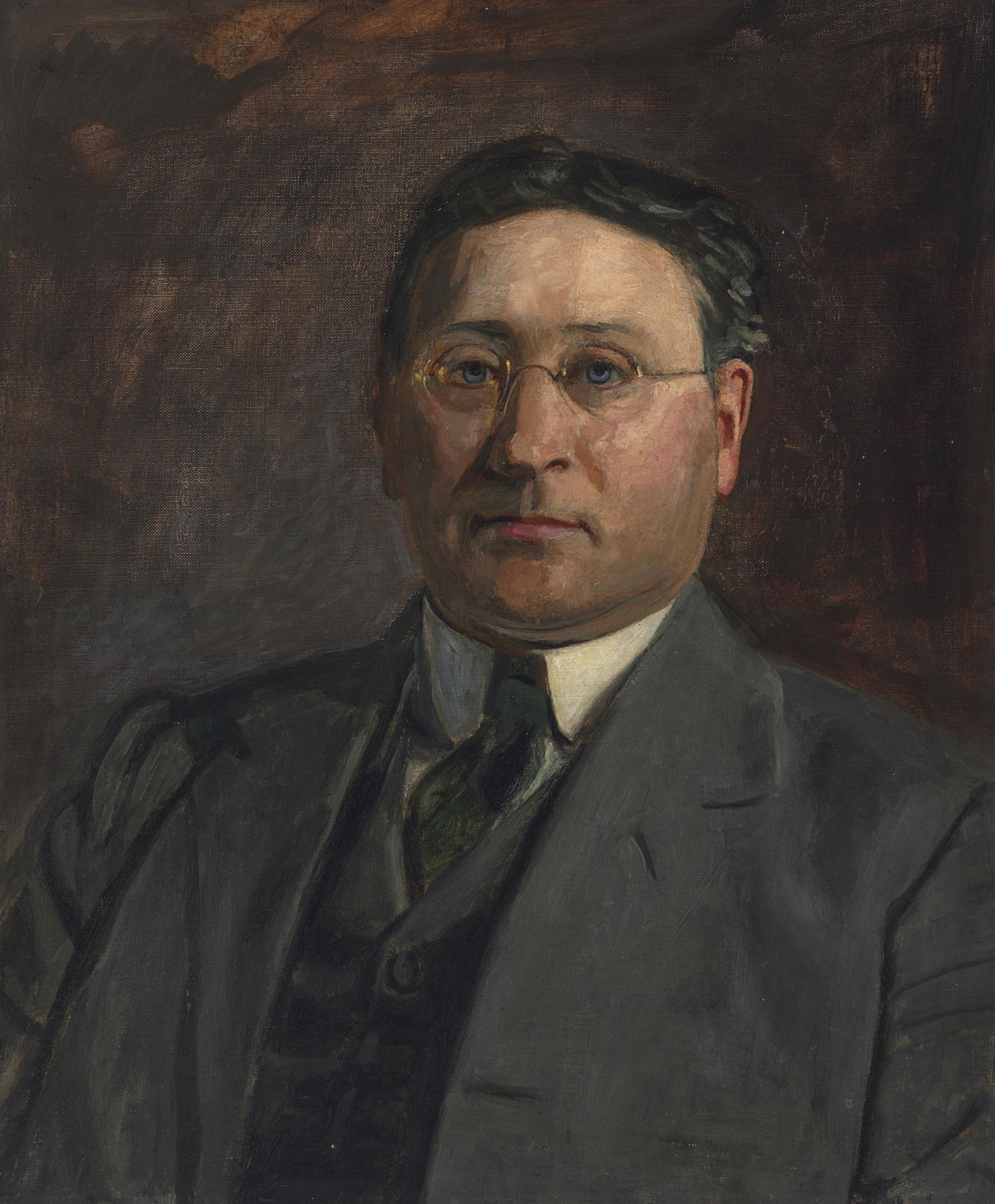
Portrait of Maurice Feely (c.1905). Irish-born. ASL c.1890. Founded a sign-painting company, 1893. Portrait painter in Paris, France (after 1905), and Hollywood (1920s). Died Philadelphia, 1941 (age 80). Deaccessioned from Hirshhorn Museum and Sculpture Garden, 2011.

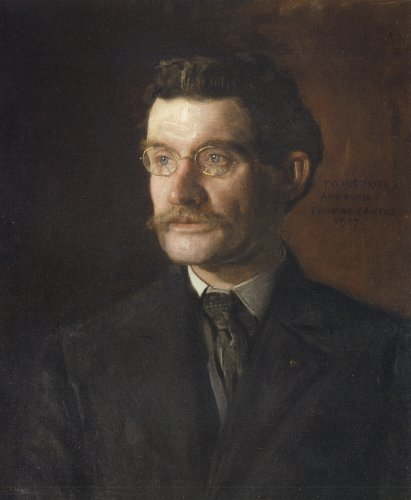
^{Terra Collection, Art Institute of Chicago.}
Portrait of Thomas J. Eagan (1907). Entered PAFA in 1885. Left ASL to become a draftsman and mechanical engineer. Settled in Conshohocken, PA. Returned to painting in retirement.
