= Staffel (mountain) =

Mountain in Bavaria, Germany

Coordinates: 47°35′N 11°28′E

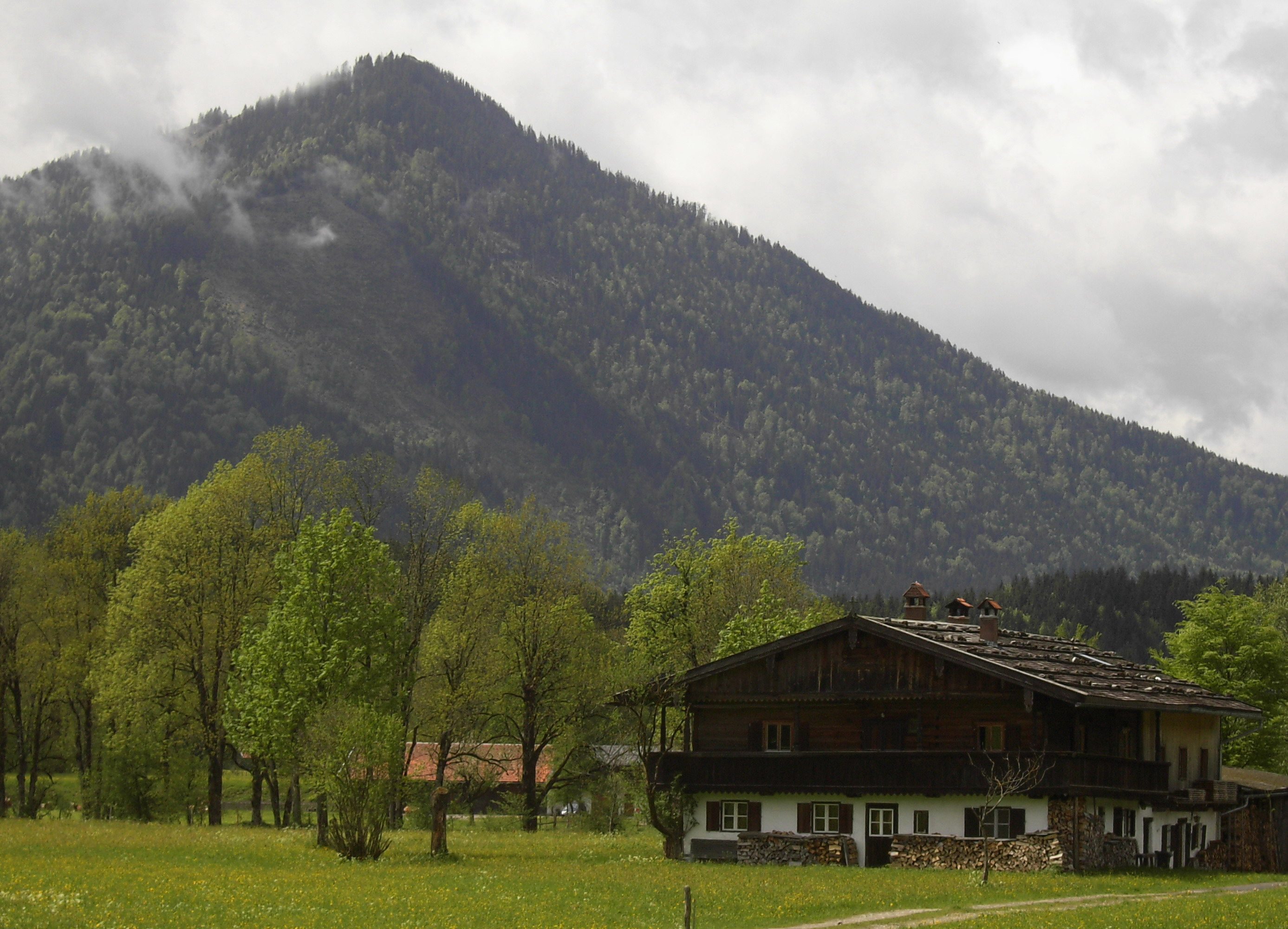

Highest point
- Elevation: 1,532 m (5,026 ft)

Geography
- Location: Bavaria, Germany

Staffel is a mountain in Bavaria, Germany. It is part of the Bavarian Prealps.
