= Megan Staffel =

American writer

Megan Staffel (born 1952, Philadelphia, Pennsylvania, USA) is an American fiction writer and essayist. She is the author of two novels, The Notebook of Lost Things and She Wanted Something Else, and three story collections, A Length of Wire and Other Stories, Lessons In Another Language and The Exit Coach. Her story collection, Lessons in Another Language, was awarded the 2011 IPPY AWARD for Bronze Medal Winner in the Short Story and the 2011 Foreword Review's Book of the Year Award for Silver Medal Winner in the Short Story. Her stories have appeared in numerous journals, including Ploughshares and New England Review. Her essays on the craft of fiction appear in A Kite in the Wind, edited by Andrea Barrett and Peter Turchi, and Letters to a Fiction Writer, edited by Frederick Busch. She teaches in the MFA Program for Writers at Warren Wilson College.

== Writing ==
The daughter of a ceramicist, Rudolf Staffel, and a painter, her fiction often concerns itself with the relationship between Epistemology and stillness, evidenced in an interview with Want Chyi for the publication Rain Taxi:

"A story creates a frame around a movement in time. It bites off a piece of life. This is why it’s necessary to read stories. Life’s constancy of movement lulls us into a soporific acceptance. If you frame a portion of it, you lift it out of context. And suddenly, it can look very different. Tragedy can frame the continuous movement of life the same way a story does. For instance, we all know what we were doing on the morning of September 11, 2001. That morning has been lifted out of our lives and will always be separate. I know I’ve arrived at the ending of a story if I’ve taken it to a place where something has happened that removes that particular life out of its assumed trajectory. It no longer fits, and thus, hangs in suspension. A short story frames a piece of the movement of life in such a way that it can never go back into place."

== Bibliography ==
- A Length of Wire and Other Stories (1983)
- She Wanted Something Else (1987)
- The Notebook of Lost Things (1999)
- Lessons In Another Language (2010)
- The Exit Coach (2016)
