= Rudolf Staffel =

American sculptor

Rudolf Harry Staffel
- Born: 1911; San Antonio, Texas, U.S.
- Died: 2002 (aged 90–91); Alfred, New York, U.S.
- Other name: Rudi Staffel
- Education: School of the Art Institute of Chicago
- Employer: Tyler School of Art
- Known for: ceramic artist, educator
- Website: www.rudolfstaffel.com

Hand-built translucent porcelain by Rudolf Staffel, 1985, Smithsonian American Art Museum

Rudolf Harry "Rudi" Staffel (1911 – 2002) was an American ceramic artist and educator.

== Biography ==
Rudolf Staffel was born in 1911 in San Antonio, Texas. Staffel attended Brackenridge High School. Staffel initially wanted to be a painter, and early on attended the School of the Art Institute of Chicago. While there, an exhibition of Wiener Werkstätte at the Field Museum of History, captivated him with its glass art.

Staffel briefly moved to Mexico to study glass blowing, and while there he fell in love with ceramics at the National Museum of Anthropology in Mexico City. His early ceramics were in a mid-century studio style, with traditional forms and glazes, although sometimes with social commentary and often with references to Native American, Asian and Scandinavian ceramic traditions. In the 1940s, he studied with Hans Hofmann in New York, who instilled in him a strong sense of "push/pull" pictorial content that would later come to maturity in his Light Gatherers. Circa 1954-1955, Staffel turned from stoneware to porcelain as the result of a dinnerware commission he was given.

By the late 1950s, Staffel worked exclusively in porcelain. His Light Gatherers, as they would become known, would occupy Staffel for the rest of his career. The ability of a work to hold and transmit light was the most important quality for him. "Even when I was a painter, I was always interest in light," he said. "Something about light coming through glass, wax, or snow. I wanted to achieve a passage of light."

Staffel made his own porcelain compositions in an effort to achieve the maximum translucency, the same as with glass or paint. He also manipulated the material via piercing, stretching, folding and even engraving. His works are almost exclusively white, are rarely glazed, and when he occasionally adds color it is limited to blue, green or, rarely, red tones that come from metal oxides.

Staffel taught at the Tyler School of Art in Elkins Park, Pennsylvania from 1940, until his retirement in 1978. While there, he mentored artists including Paula Winokur, and John E. Dowell Jr.

Staffel died in 2002 in Alfred, New York. His daughter is writer Megan Staffel.

== Exhibitions ==
Staffel has his first one-person museum exhibition at the Museum of Contemporary Crafts (now the Museum of Art and Design) in New York, in 1967. From 1976 he showed regularly in one-person and group exhibitions at Helen Drutt Gallery in Philadelphia. He was the subject of the retrospectives Rudolf Staffel: Selected Works, 1935-1989 at Temple University, Philadelphia in 1989; Transparency in Clay: The Work of Rudolf Staffel at Museum voor Het Kruithuis, 's-Hertogenbosch, The Netherlands in 1990; and Rudolf Staffel: Searching for Light; A Retrospective View, 1936-1996 at the Museum of Applied Arts, Helsinki, in 1996 and which travelled to the Philadelphia Museum of Art in 1997.

Prominent group shows in which he's recently been included are Clay Into Art: Selections from the Collection of Contemporary Ceramics at the Metropolitan Museum of Art, New York, in 1998; Crafting A Legacy: Contemporary American Crafts in the Philadelphia Museum of Art in 2003; Dirt on Delight: Impulses That Form Clay at the ICA, Philadelphia and the Walker Art Center, Minneapolis in 2009-2010 and White Magic: Robert Ryman and Rudolf Staffel at David Nolan Gallery, New York in 2014.

== Collections ==
Staffel is represented widely in important museum collections across the United States and internationally, including at the Metropolitan Museum of Art, New York City, New York; the Philadelphia Museum of Art; the Smithsonian Museum of American Art, Washington, D.C.; the Houston Museum of Fine Arts; the Los Angeles County Museum of Art; the Victoria and Albert Museum, London; the State Hermitage Museum, St. Petersburg; Museum Boymans-van Beuningen, Rotterdam; Woodmere Art Museum; and the Museum of Art and Design, Helsinki.

== Recognition and reception ==
As a result of his innovations, technical prowess and vision, Staffel is widely considered to be one of the most significant American ceramic artists working in the latter half of the 20th century. Noted historian Garth Clark called Staffel "one of the most original vessel makers in American ceramics." Comparisons have also been made to the work of George Ohr, although Staffel was not directly aware of the earlier ceramicist's work. "While Ohr revealed his virtuosity in paper-thin ceramics, Staffel took this a step further. His porcelain vases show a mastery of the material which is virtually breath-taking in its fragility and transparency." Marianne Aav called him "one of the most daring innovators and renewers of ceramic thinking during the late twentieth century" and noted that "Especially among the pieces from the 1970s onward, there are examples that show risk-taking, daring and freedom from all conventional forms that is seldom, if ever, seen in ceramics … We can say that Staffel is an expressionist, a very sophisticated one, whose work is based on incredible skill and thorough observation."

== Awards ==
- 1977 National Endowment for the Arts
- 1978 American Craft Council, Fellows Award
- 1982 Pennsylvania Council on the Arts, Hazlett Memorial Award for Excellence in the Arts
- 1990 National Endowment for the Arts
- 1995 American Craft Council, College of Fellows, Gold Medal for Lifetime Achievement
- 1996 Pew Fellowships in the Arts

== Sources ==
- Jeffri, Joan (ed.), The Craftsperson Speaks, Artists in Varied Media Discuss Their Crafts, New York, Greenwood Press, 1992.
- "Oral history interview with Rudolf Staffel, 1987 July 17-Aug. 6", Smithsonian Archives of American Art
- "E. Sozanski, "A Master Of Light Ceramic Artist Rudolf Staffel Has Made A Career In Translucency-- Light Gathering, He Calls It. At 84, He's Reaping Wide Notice, Including A Retrospective Of His Life's Work That Opens Next Month In Helsinki.", Philadelphia Inquirer, May 21, 1996.
