= San Simeone =

San Simeone may refer to

- San Simeone Piccolo, the Church of San Simeone Piccolo in Santa Croce, Venice, northern Italy
- San Simeone Profeta, the Church of San Simeone Grande in Santa Croce, Venice, northern Italy
- San Simeone Profeta, Rome, a former titular church in Rome, in the Ponte district, located in Piazza Lancellotti.
