= San Giovanni Battista, Mensano =

Church in Mensano, Italy

Coordinates: 43.3008°N 11.0542°E

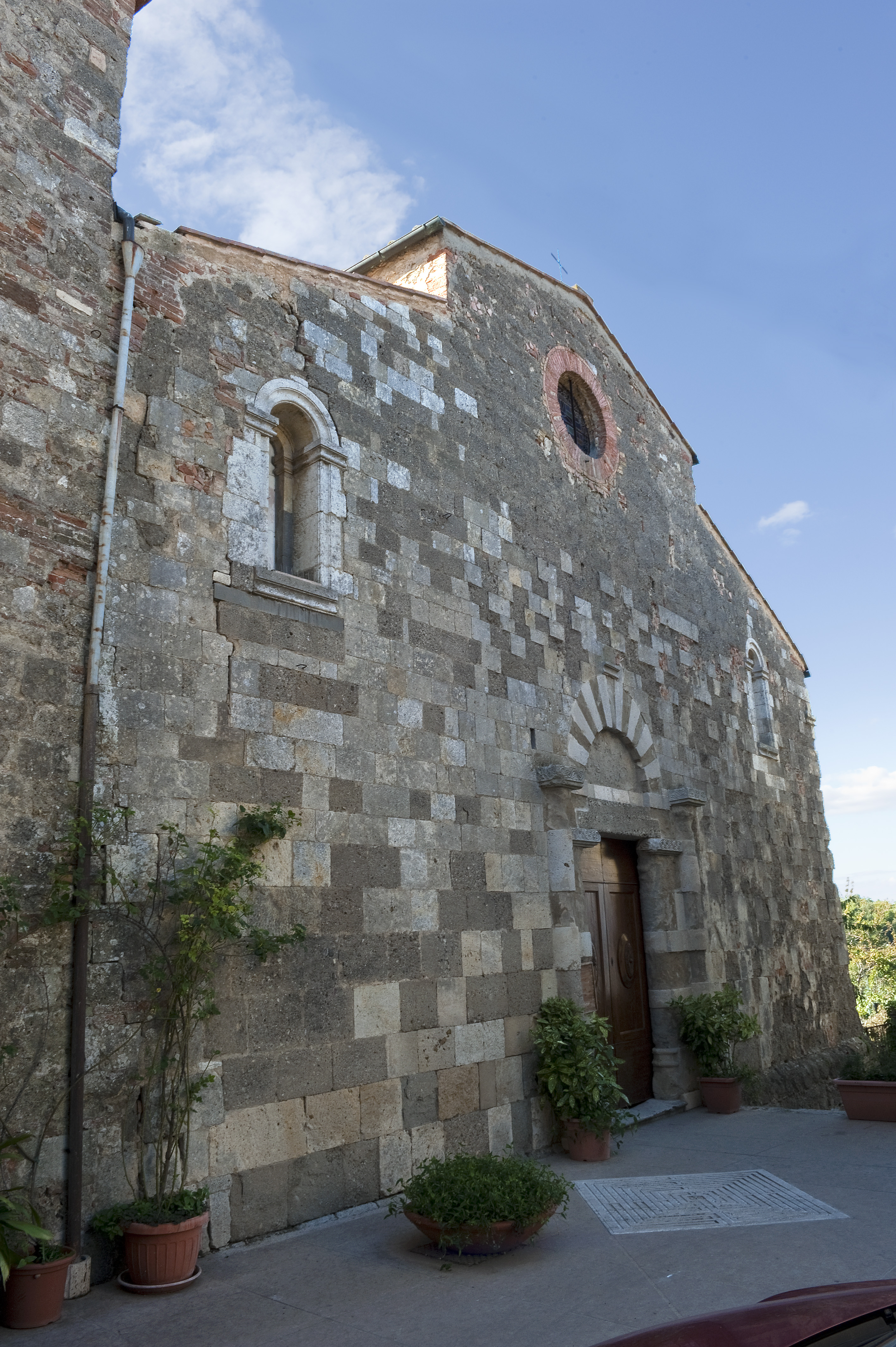
San Giovanni Battista in Mensano

San Giovanni Battista is a Romanesque-style, Roman Catholic pieve, or rural parish church with baptistery, located in the village of Mensano, in the comune of Casole d'Elsa, Tuscany, Italy.

== History ==
A church at the site is documented in a papal bull of Pope Alexander III since 1171. Inscriptions uncovered in the three nave church attributed work of maestro Buonamico in the construction. Traces of 13th-century frescoes are present.
