= Marco Romano =

Marco Romano may refer to:

- Marco Romano (sculptor) (fl. c. 1318), Italian sculptor
- Marco Romano (footballer) (1910–1952), Italian footballer
- Marco Romano (fencer) (born 1953), Italian fencer and physician
- Marco Romano (rower) (born 1963), Italian lightweight rower
- Marco Romano Frigerio (born 2001), Italian footballer
