= Stanley Whitney =

American contemporary artist (born 1946)

- Born: November 11, 1946 (age 79); Bryn Mawr, Pennsylvania, U.S.A.
- Education: Kansas City Art Institute (B.A.); Yale University (M.F.A)
- Occupations: Painter, printmaker

Stanley Whitney (born 1946) is an American artist who primarily works in abstract painting and printmaking.

== Biography ==
Stanley Whitney was born in Bryn Mawr, Pennsylvania on November 11, 1946. The third of four children, his father was a real estate agent and accountant, and his mother worked for the board of education in nearby Philadelphia. The family were part of Bryn Mawr's small, working-class black community, and lived in an apartment above a store owned by his father.

In 1964, Whitney enrolled in art school at the Columbus College of Art and Design and then transferred to the Kansas City Art Institute, where he completed his undergraduate degree in 1968. He also spent time studying at Skidmore College, where Philip Guston befriended and served as an early mentor to Whitney, and in an exchange program at the New York Studio School of Drawing, Painting and Sculpture. Avoiding Vietnam War draft eligibility due to asthma, he continued to graduate school at the Yale School of Art.

As an art student in Kansas City, Whitney chose not to involve himself with the Black Panther Party, and resisted pressure for African-American artists to make overtly political work about black identity and experience.

After graduating from Yale, Whitney became an instructor of painting and drawing, teaching at the University of Rhode Island, Stanford University, and UC Berkeley before joining Temple University's Tyler School of Art and Architecture, where he remained on the faculty for at least twenty years.

He is married to the artist Marina Adams (b. 1960), with whom he shares one son, William. The couple previously lived in Rome and in a loft overlooking Cooper Square in New York City. As of 2024, they live between homes in Bridgehampton, New York and Solignano, Italy.

== Work and approach ==
=== Painting ===
Whitney has engaged in abstraction since early in his career, and is best known for his paintings which take the form of "grids" of color, arranged in four rows. He arrived at this mode while working in Italy in the 1990s, after the sights of stone blocks in ancient monuments and closely-stacked funeral urns at the Museo Etrusco Guarnacci led Whitney to reconcile his concepts of space and color in painting: “When I understood that, I felt I had the last piece of the puzzle. Space is in the color – boom, I’ve got it." Other influences cited by Whitney have included Paul Cézanne, Piet Mondrian, Agnes Martin, and the quilters of Gee's Bend.

In a 2015 interview, Whitney considered: "I never think about the structure as a grid—though it is a grid, really. I’m a real New York City painter, if you know what I mean. My paintings are just the way New York is. I want that kind of simplicity, which is also the madness of New York, because of the color. So you have this contradiction, in a sense. There’s the grid, which should be very orderly, and then you put the color, and it throws the whole thing off." In a given work, he will begin painting with a single stripe of color beginning at the top-left corner of his canvas, and then paint along and down in square forms using a method inspired by jazz improvisation: “Once I’ve got one color down, it will tell me what the next color will be.”

=== Other media ===
Whitney has also worked in monotype and in drawing, and premiered his first work in stained glass in 2022. Created to fulfill a commission by the Baltimore Museum of Art for permanent installation in their Ruth R. Marder Center for Matisse Studies, Whitney's suite of stained glass windows were inspired by Henri Matisse's work at the Chapelle du Rosaire de Vence.

== Recognition ==
Whitney worked in "relative obscurity" for the majority of his career, often failing to sell paintings; he did not stage an exhibition in a public institution until he was 68 years old. He began to receive public acclaim in the early 21st century after adopting what became his signature style. A 2015 New York Times review praised his work for having "quietly and firmly expanded abstraction’s possibilities." By 2023, The Guardian had named Whitney "the greatest abstract artist in America."

Whitney was inducted as a member of the American Academy of Arts and Letters in 2017. Other honors awarded to Whitney have included the inaugural Robert De Niro Sr. Prize (2011); a Pollock-Krasner Foundation fellowship; and a Guggenheim Fellowship (1996).

== Art market ==
Whitney is represented by Galerie Nordenhake since 2012, and has exhibited across the three locations of the gallery in Berlin, Stockholm, and Mexico City. He is also represented by Gagosian Gallery since 2022, having previously staged his first exhibition with Gagosian at the gallery's Rome location in 2020. At previous phases of his career, he was represented by and staged solo exhibitions with Lisson Gallery, Matthew Marks Gallery, Team Gallery, Galerie Christine König, and Albert Baronian.

In 2022, his painting Forward to Black (1996) sold for over US$2.3 million at Sotheby's in New York, setting a record for the artist. In 2024, two of Whitney's paintings became the subject of multimillion-dollar legal filings between art dealer Gary Tatintsian and art collector Andrey Isaev.

== Exhibitions ==
Museum exhibitions focused on Whitney's work have included Stanley Whitney: Dance the Orange (2015) at the Studio Museum in Harlem, New York; FOCUS: Stanley Whitney (2017) at the Modern Art Museum of Fort Worth; Stanley Whitney: Dance with Me Henri (2022) at the Baltimore Museum of Art; and Stanley Whitney: The Italian Paintings (2022), which was presented by the Buffalo AKG Art Museum at Palazzo Tiepolo Passi during the 59th Venice Biennale.

A first major museum retrospective of Whitney's work, Stanley Whitney: How High the Moon (2024), was organized by and premiered at the Buffalo AKG Art Museum, where the exhibition was curated by Cathleen Chaffee. The exhibition also travelled to the Walker Art Center and the Institute of Contemporary Art, Boston.

His paintings have also broadly appeared in group shows, notably including Quiet as it's Kept (2002), an influential exhibition of black American abstract artists which was curated by David Hammons and staged at Christine König Gallery in Vienna. His paintings were also shown at the 50th Venice Biennale (2003) and as part of documenta 14 (2017).

== Collections ==
- Addison Gallery of American Art
- Art Gallery of New South Wales
- Art Institute of Chicago
- Baltimore Museum of Art
- Birmingham Museum of Art
- Buffalo AKG Art Museum
- Harvard Art Museums
- He Art Museum
- High Museum of Art
- McNay Art Museum
- Metropolitan Museum of Art
- Modern Art Museum of Fort Worth
- Moderna Museet
- Morgan Library & Museum
- Museum of Fine Arts, Boston
- Museum of Fine Arts, Houston
- National Gallery of Canada
- Nelson-Atkins Museum of Art
- Nerman Museum of Contemporary Art
- Palm Springs Art Museum
- Pennsylvania Academy of the Fine Arts
- Rollins Museum of Art
- Saint Louis Art Museum
- Sheldon Museum of Art
- Solomon R. Guggenheim Museum
- Studio Museum in Harlem
- Whitney Museum of American Art
- Yale University Art Gallery
