= Palazzo Gradenigo =

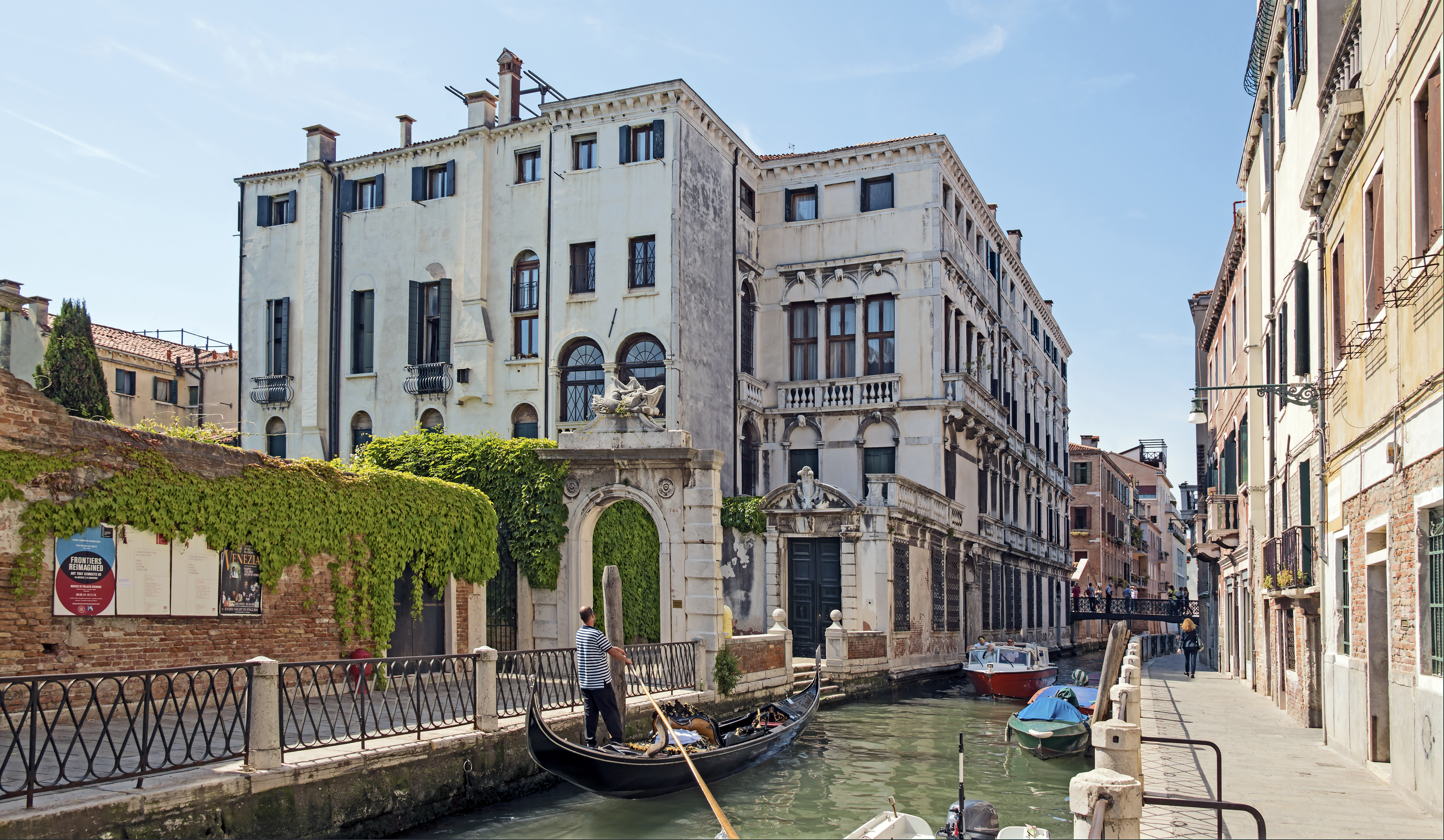
- Palazzo Gradenigo as seen from fondamenta rio Marina
- Interactive map of the Palazzo Gradenigo area

General information
- Type: Residential
- Architectural style: Baroque
- Location: Santa Croce district, Venice, Italy
- Coordinates: 45°26′25.48″N 12°19′26.16″E
- Construction stopped: 17th century

Technical details
- Floor count: 4 levels

Design and construction
- Architect: Domenico Margutti

Palazzo Gradenigo is a palace in Venice, located in the Santa Croce district, near Palazzo Soranzo Cappello and the church of San Simeone Profeta, and overlooking Rio Marin.

== History ==
The palace was built on a project by architect Domenico Margutti, a student of Baldassare Longhena, at the end of the 17th century to be the grand residence of the Gradenigo family, one of the noblest among the Venetian aristocracy. Over the centuries, the palace was the site of great celebrations, which were held in the palace gardens. In the 19th century, Archduke Frederick of Austria lived in the palace and died there.

In the early 20th century these gardens inspired some places in novel Il Fuoco by the Italian writer Gabriele D'Annunzio.

Currently, the palazzo is in good condition after being restored in 1999.

== Architecture ==
The façade has three levels and an attic open by square windows, overlooks the river, on which, on the ground floor, there are two portals.

The two noble floors are asymmetrical: the first features a series of ten balustraded single-lancet windows; the second has larger windows, among which stands out, on the far left, a quadrifora, corresponding on the facade overlooking the garden, to a trifora.

It is precisely the garden that has made the palace famous: in fact, until the early 20th century the garden was among the vastest in Venice and was one of the greatest prides of the Gradenigos. A small part of it remains nowadays, following the building development in the surrounding area.

Inside, much of the original pictorial decoration has been lost over the centuries; however, there remain 17th-century stuccos and some 18th-century frescoes attributed to Jacopo Guarana.

== Gallery ==
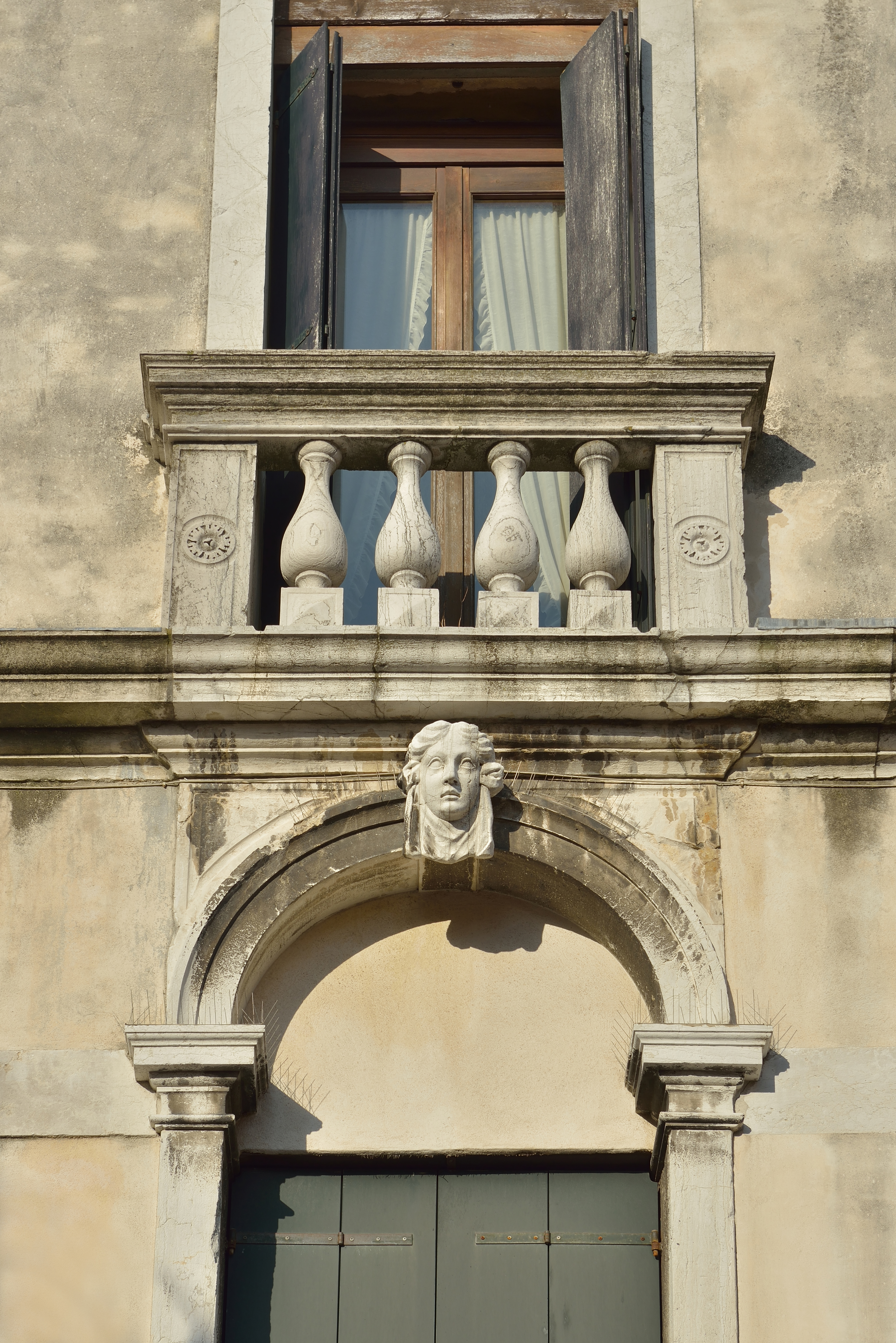
Facade details

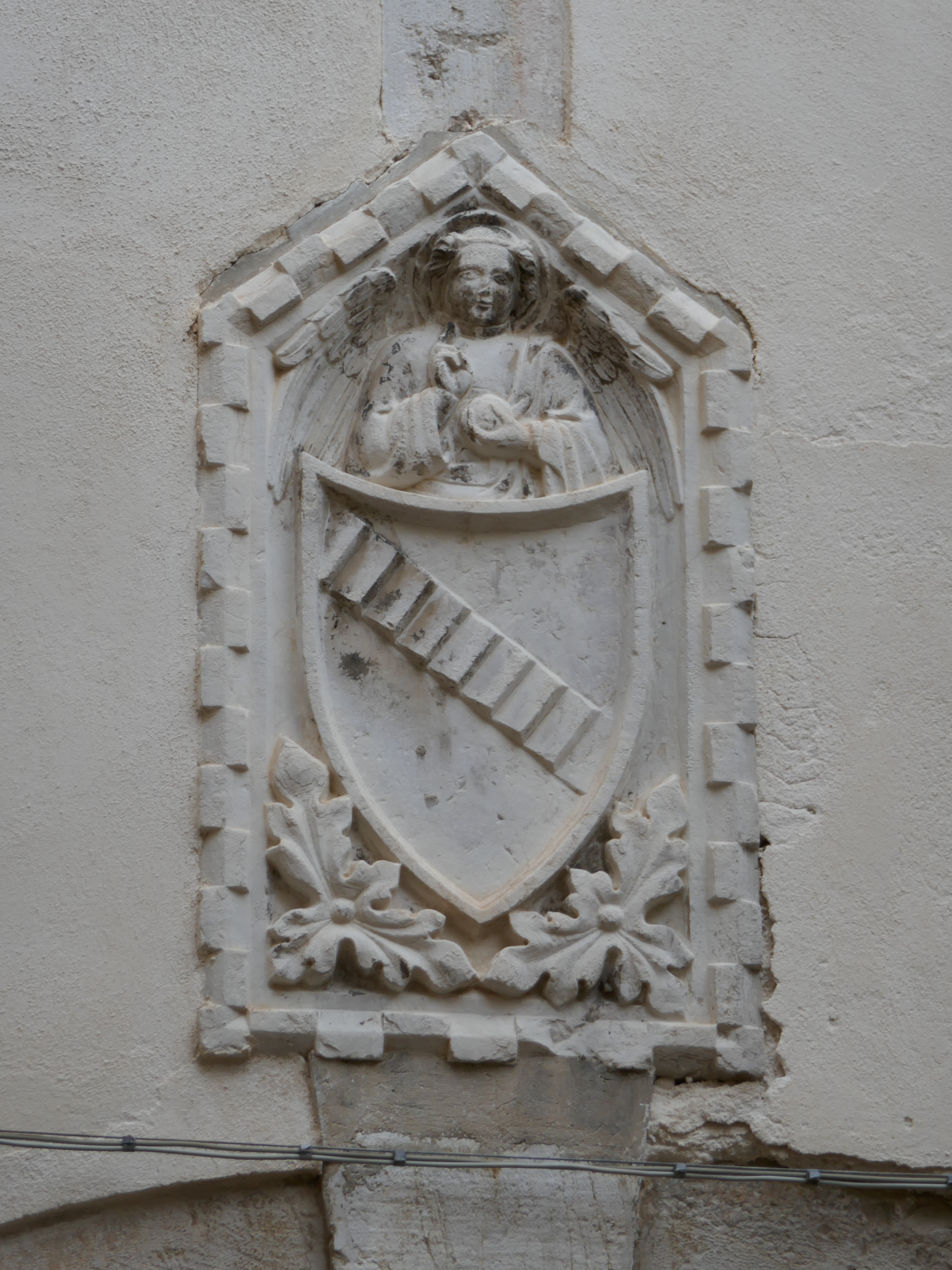
Gradenigo coat of arms

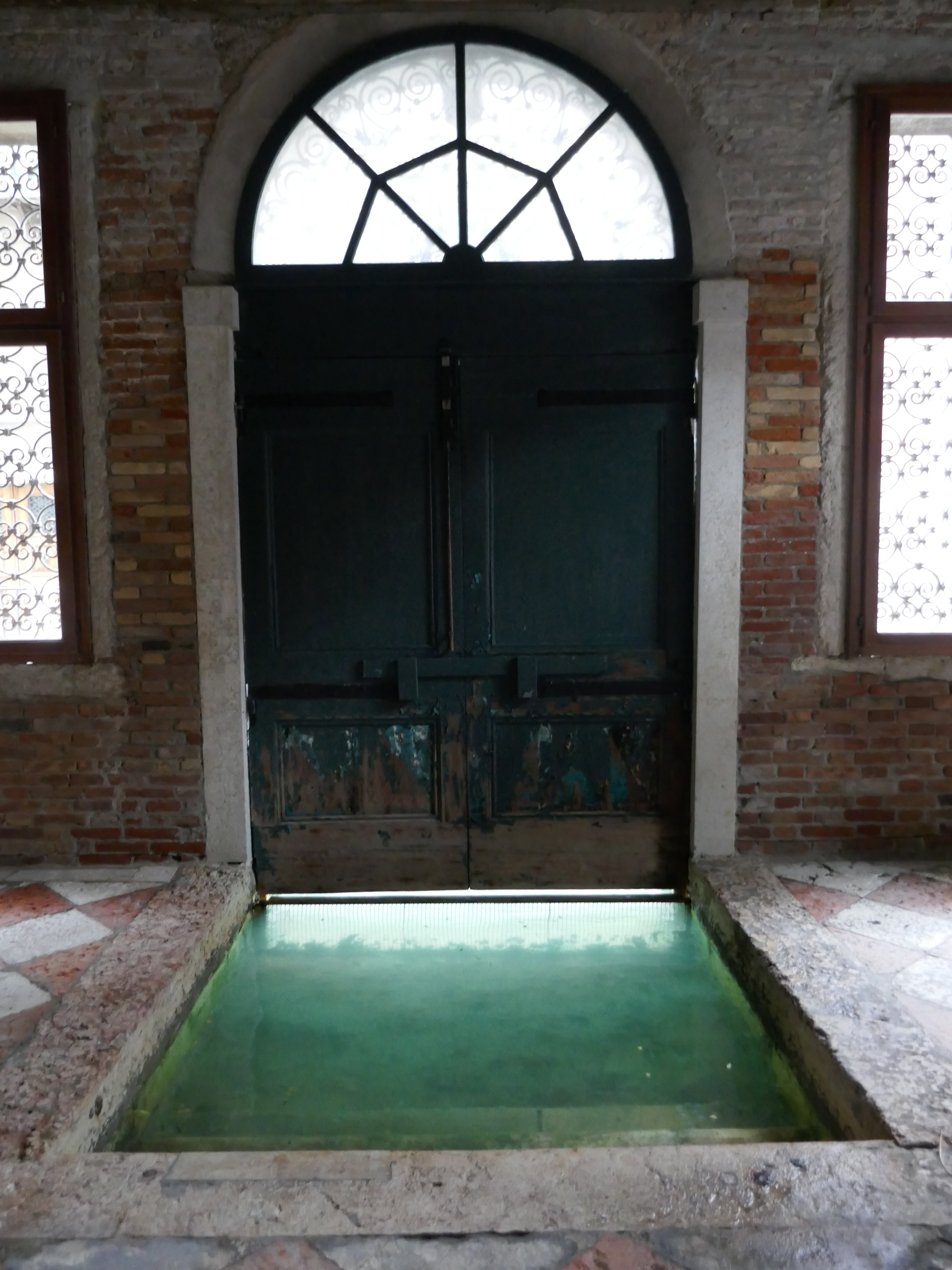
Portal to the canal

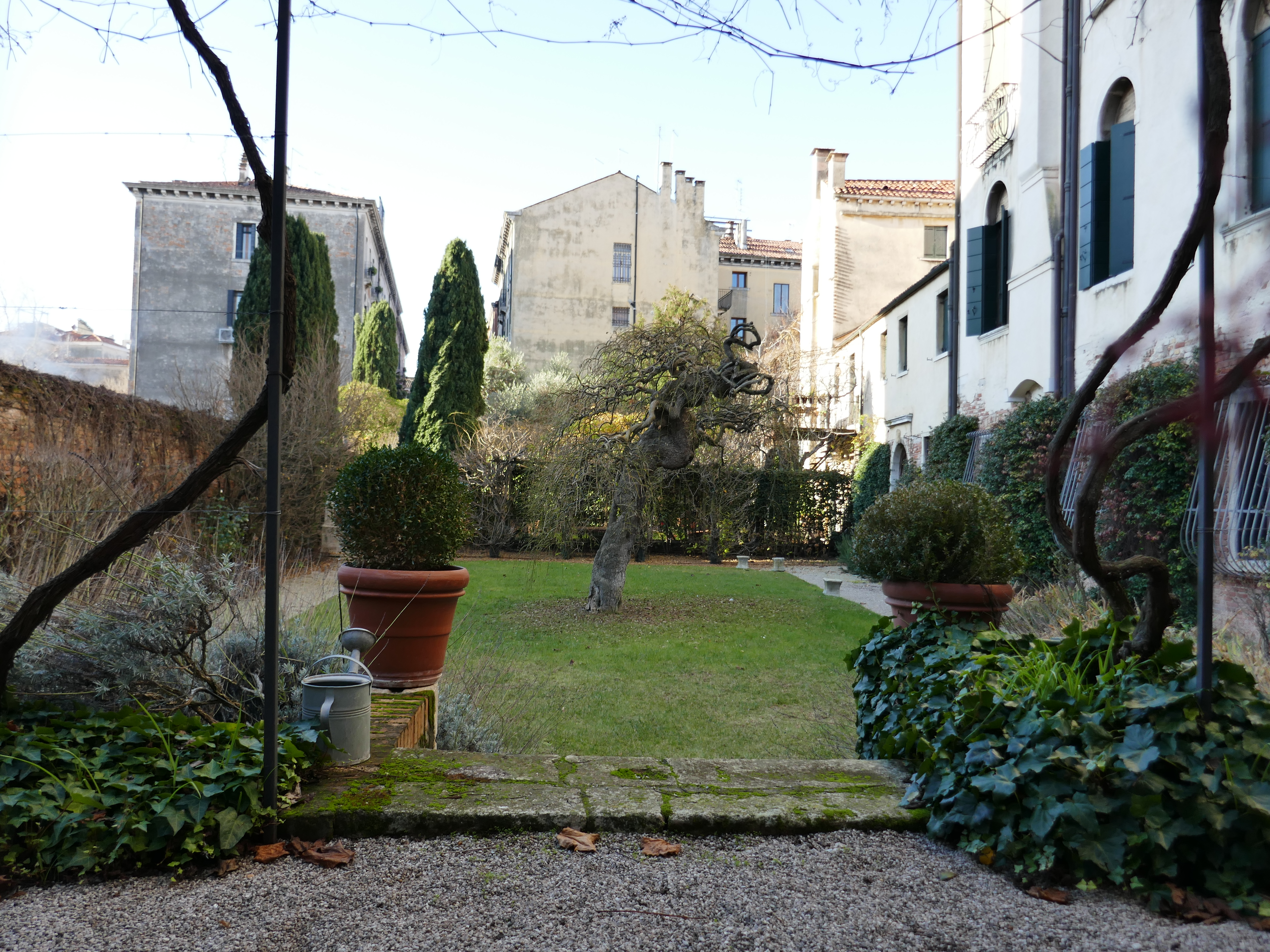
Garden

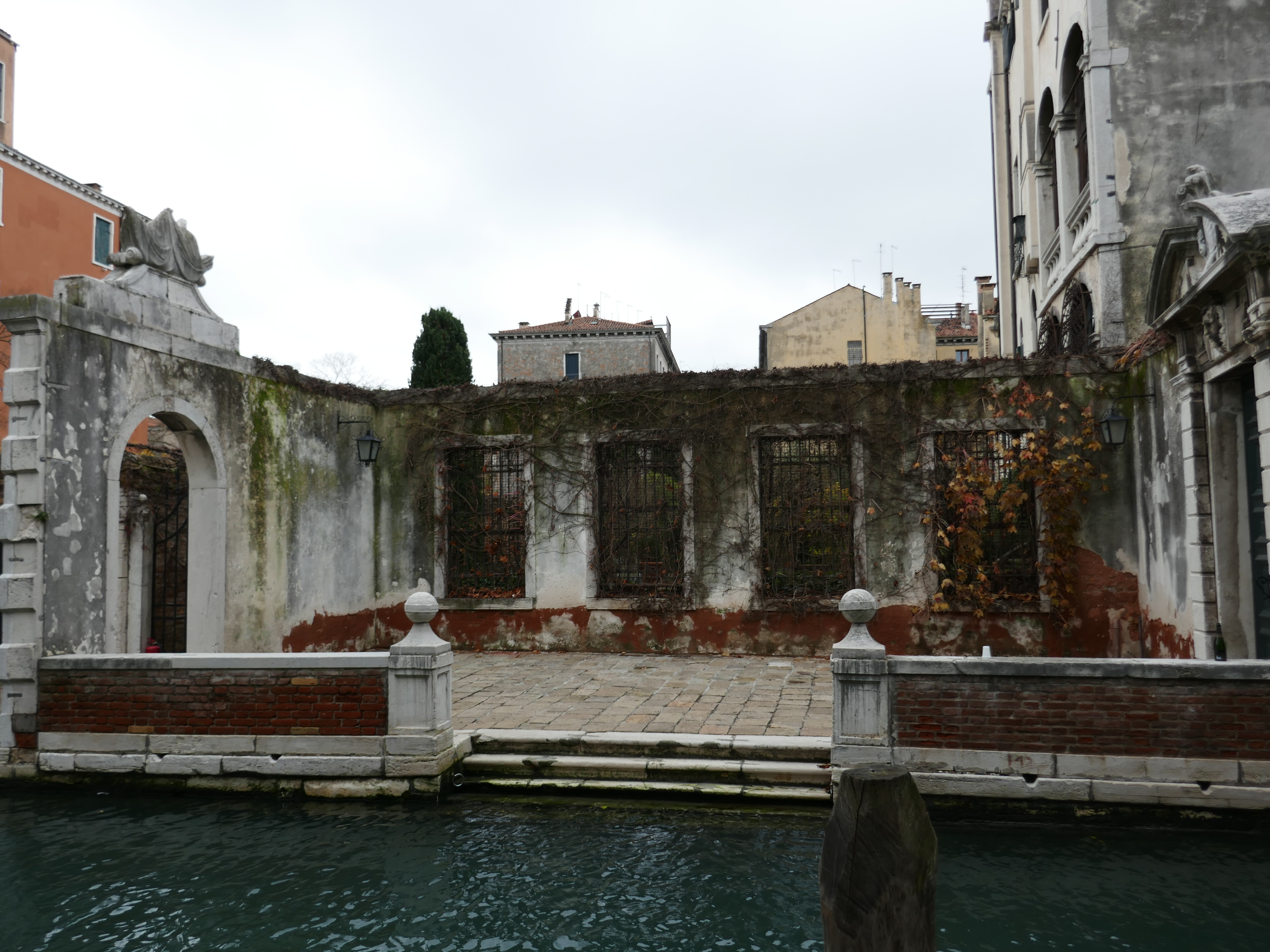
The entry to the garden
