= Marco Romano (sculptor) =

Italian sculptor (fl. c. 1318)

Marco Romano (fl. c. 1318) was an Italian sculptor active in Venice and Rome, best remembered for his work on the Siena Cathedral, the collegiate church in Casole d'Elsa, and the San Simeone Profeta.
