= Cavallano =

- Frazione
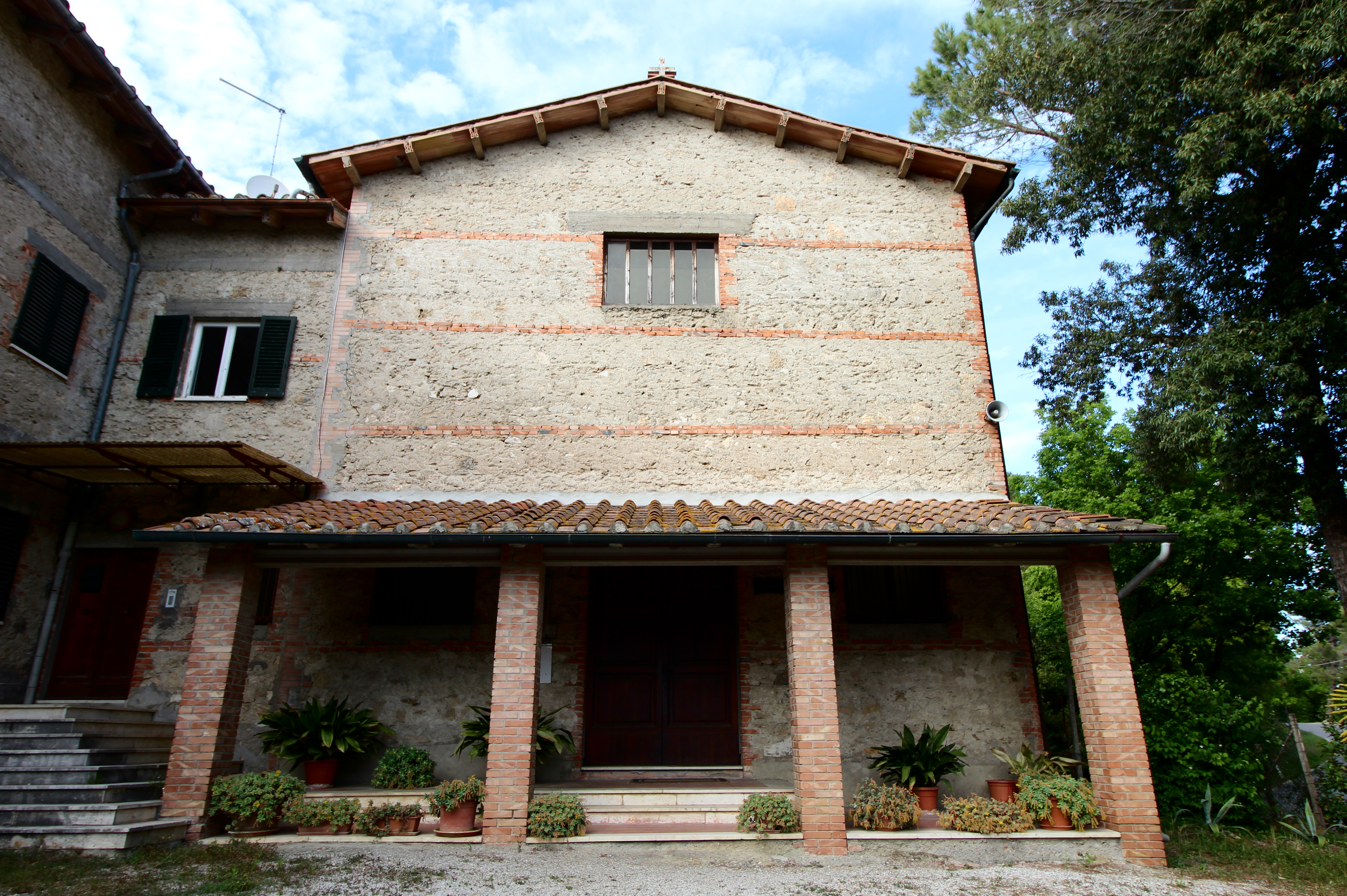
- The church of San Michele in Cavallano

- Location of Cavallano in Italy
- Coordinates: 43°21′48″N 11°2′18″E
- Country: Italy
- Region: Tuscany
- Province: Siena (SI)
- Comune: Casole d'Elsa
- Elevation: 298 m (978 ft)

Population (2011)
  - Total: 421
- Demonym: Cavallanai / Cavallanesi
- Time zone: UTC+1 (CET)
  - Summer (DST): UTC+2 (CEST)

Cavallano is a village in Tuscany, central Italy, administratively a frazione of the comune of Casole d'Elsa, province of Siena. At the time of the 2001 census its population was 118.

Cavallano is about 40 km from Siena and 4 km from Casole d'Elsa.
