= Erica Baum =

American photographer (born 1961)

- Born: 1961 (age 63–64); New York City
- Education: Barnard College; Yale University
- Known for: Photography

Erica Baum (born 1961) is an American photographer who lives and works in New York City. She is known for her work that uses printed paper and language as subject, in a form of word art.

== Early life and education ==
Baum was born in New York City in 1961.

She received a BA in anthropology from Barnard College in 1984. She also received an MA in TESOL/applied linguistics from Hunter College in 1988, and an MFA in photography from Yale University in 1994.

== Work ==
Baum's work is characterized by a cropped, close-up style that captures the material details of subjects, ranging from chalkboards to library card catalogues, book pages and newspaper. Her composition of these details and her use of language has been compared to concrete poetry.

Baum's work is in the collections of the Albright-Knox Art Gallery, Metropolitan Museum of Art, the Solomon R. Guggenheim Museum, Whitney Museum of American Art and the Yale University Art Gallery, among others.

== Exhibitions ==
- Foul Play, Thread Waxing Space, New York (1999)
- Subject Index, Malmö Konstmuseum, Sweden (2008)
- The Imminence of Poetics, São Paulo Biennial (2012)
- Athens Biennial (2013)
- Kunstverein Langenhagen, Germany (2013)
- Reloaded: Concrete Trends, Weserburg Museum für Moderne Kunst, Bremen, Germany (2015)
- Photo-Poetics: An Anthology, Solomon R. Guggenheim Museum, New York (2015)
- The Arcades: Contemporary Art and Walter Benjamin, Jewish Museum, New York (2017)

== Publications ==
- Chaffee, Cathleen; Colard, Jean-Max (2016). Erica Baum: The Naked Eye (art exhibition). Erica Baum (photographer). Crevecœur/Bureau. ISBN 978-2954136943.
- The Melody Indicator, Triple Canopy (2012)
- Dog Ear, with Kenneth Goldsmith and Béatrice Gross, Ugly Duckling Presse (2011)
- Sightings, One Star Presse (2011)
- Naked Eye, with Kenneth Goldsmith, Free Association (2009)
