= Palazzo Tiepoletto =

Building in Venice, Italy

Palazzetto Tiepolo
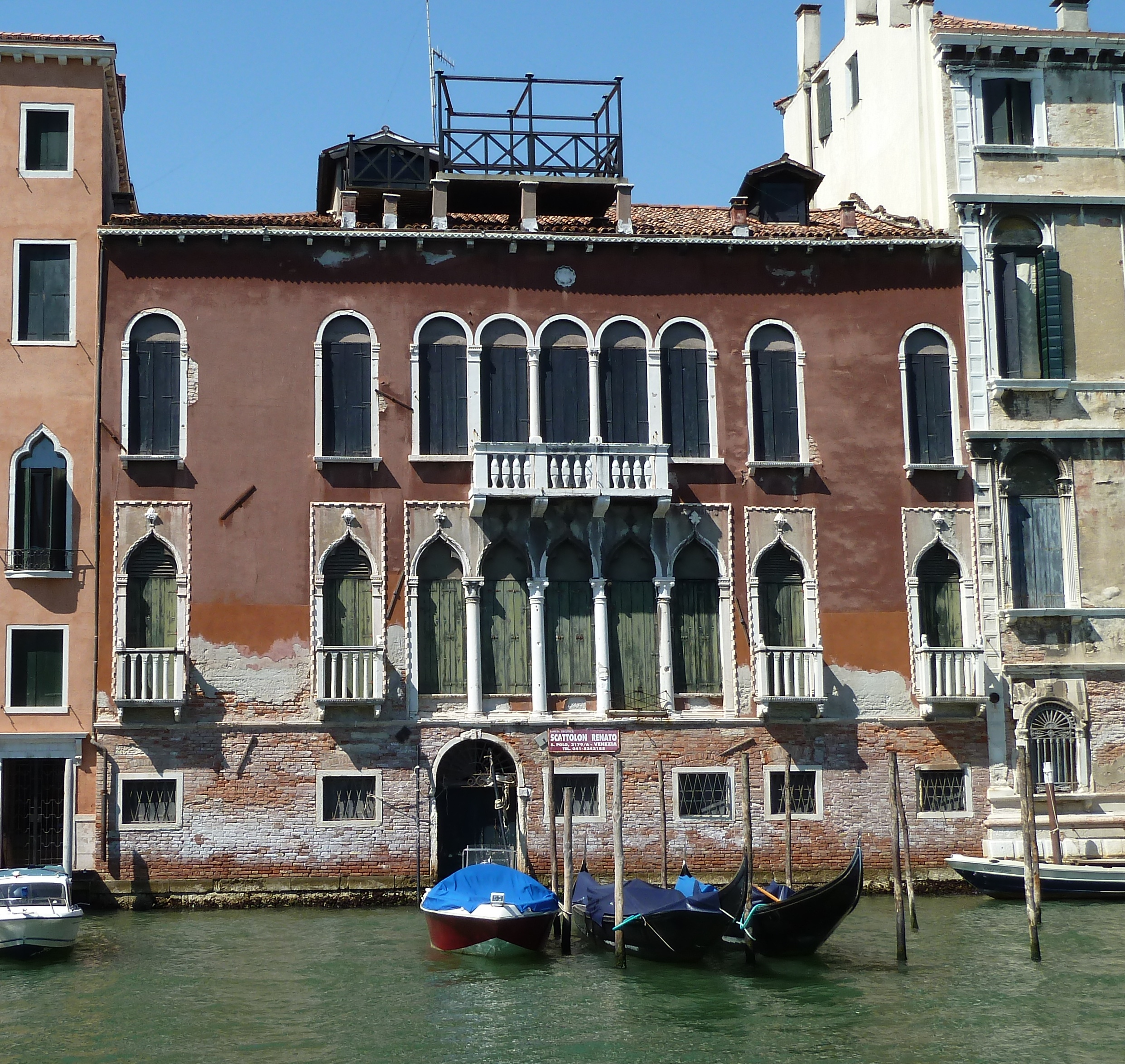
- Palazzo Soranzo Pisani
- Interactive map of the Palazzetto Tiepolo area

General information
- Type: Residential
- Architectural style: Gothic, Renaissance
- Location: San Polo district, Venice, Italy
- Coordinates: 45°26′08.77″N 12°19′44.11″E

Technical details
- Floor count: 3

Palazzo Tiepoletto (also known as Palazzetto Tiepolo or Palazzo Soranzo Pisani) is a 15th-century palace on the Grand Canal in Venice, located in the San Polo district, between Palazzo Tiepolo and Palazzo Tiepolo Passi. Built in the Venetian Gothic style with later Renaissance additions, it has historically been owned by several noble Venetian families: Tiopolo, Soranzo, Pisani, and, since the 19th century, the Passi Family, who remain its proprietors today. The name Tiepoletto, a diminutive form meaning “smaller Tiepolo”, distinguishes it from the adjacent Palazzo Tiepolo Passi.

== History ==
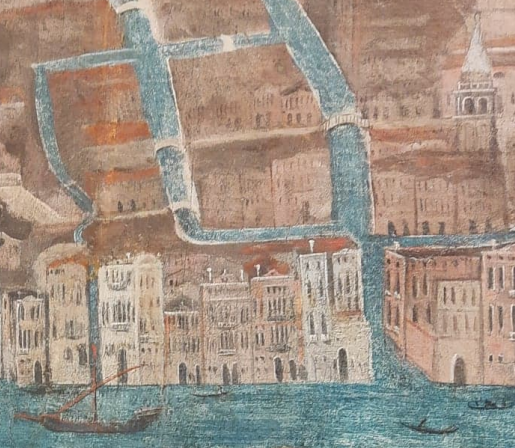
17th century painting of Palazzo Tiepoletto

The first and second floors of Palazzo Tiepoletto date to the 15th century, while the third floor is likely a 16th-century addition. The palace originally had two doors opening onto the canal, but by the late 19th century the smaller right-hand door had been walled up. Earlier depictions, such as Canaletto’s Grand Canal from Palazzo Balbi toward Rialto (1722), show a slightly different arrangement, with a balcony on the first floor and Gothic arches also on the second.

In the early 19th century, the complex was still owned by the Tiepolo family. Later in that century, the property passed to Giulia Valier, a descendant through Caterina Tiepolo, and subsequently to her son Enrico Matteo Passi. The Passi family, originally from Bergamo, settled in Venice around 1900 and have retained ownership to this day. Enrico Matteo Passi was responsible for giving the building much of its present appearance.

Extensive conservation and renovation work on the ground floor was completed in 2010. Excavations revealed 18th–19th-century floors approximately 70–80 cm below current levels, as well as drainage channels leading directly into the canal. The lower parts of the building, historically used as service quarters and kitchens, now house apartments.

== Architecture ==
The façade of Palazzo Tiepoletto is entirely covered with reddish-brown plaster and combines elements of the Venetian Gothic and Renaissance architectural styles. It is among the lowest buildings along the Grand Canal between the Rio di San Polo and the Rio di San Tomà.

The ground floor, lacking a mezzanine, features a modestly sized water portal positioned asymmetrically toward the left, rather than in the center of the façade. A second, smaller entrance to the right, visible in 19th-century depictions such as Antonio Quadri’s Il Canal Grande di Venezia (1831), has since been walled up.

The first Piano Nobile displays a central pentafora (five-light window) with pointed Gothic arches, flanked on each side by pairs of single-lancet (monofora) windows, all framed by denticulated (serrated) stone mouldings. The side windows retain small balconies, while the central pentafora lacks one—likely the result of later remodeling.

The second Piano Nobile follows the same overall layout but with round-arched openings instead of pointed ones. Here, a continuous balcony runs beneath the three central arches of the polifora.

Overall, the architectural composition of Palazzo Tiepoletto reflects the transitional aesthetic typical of late 15th- and early 16th-century Venice, blending mature Gothic forms with early Renaissance symmetry and restraint.

== Gallery ==
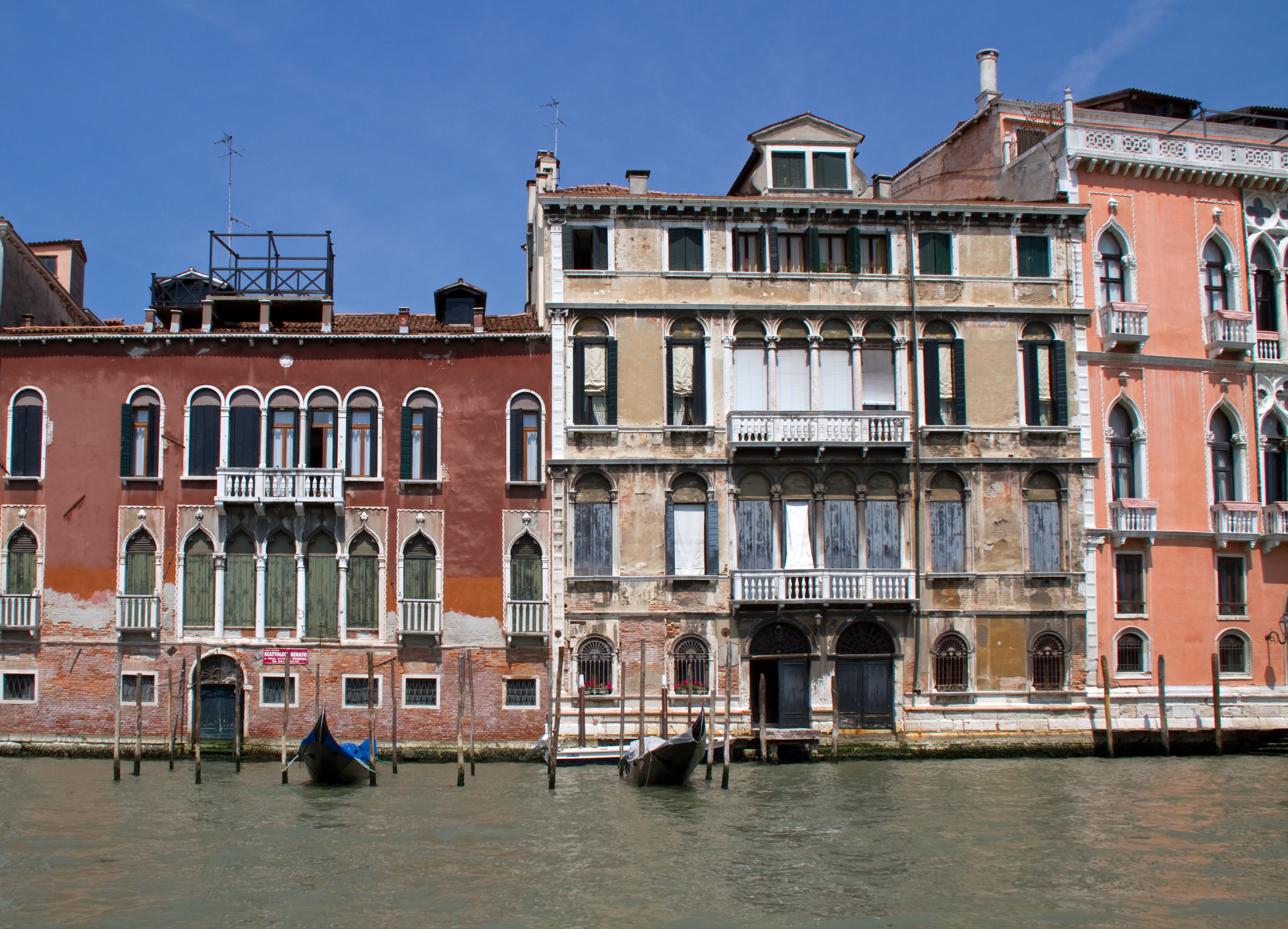
View from Grand Canal

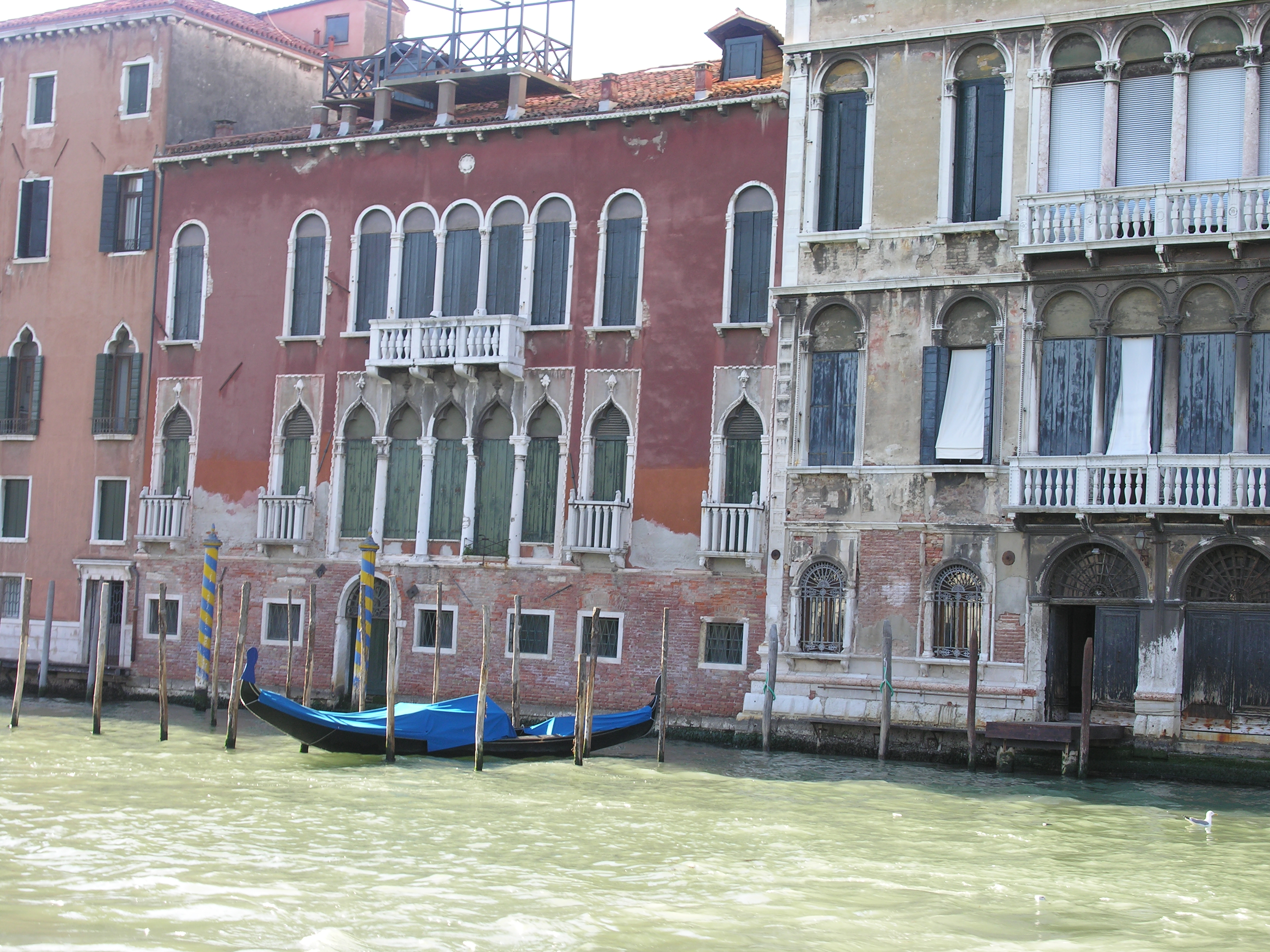
View from Grand Canal

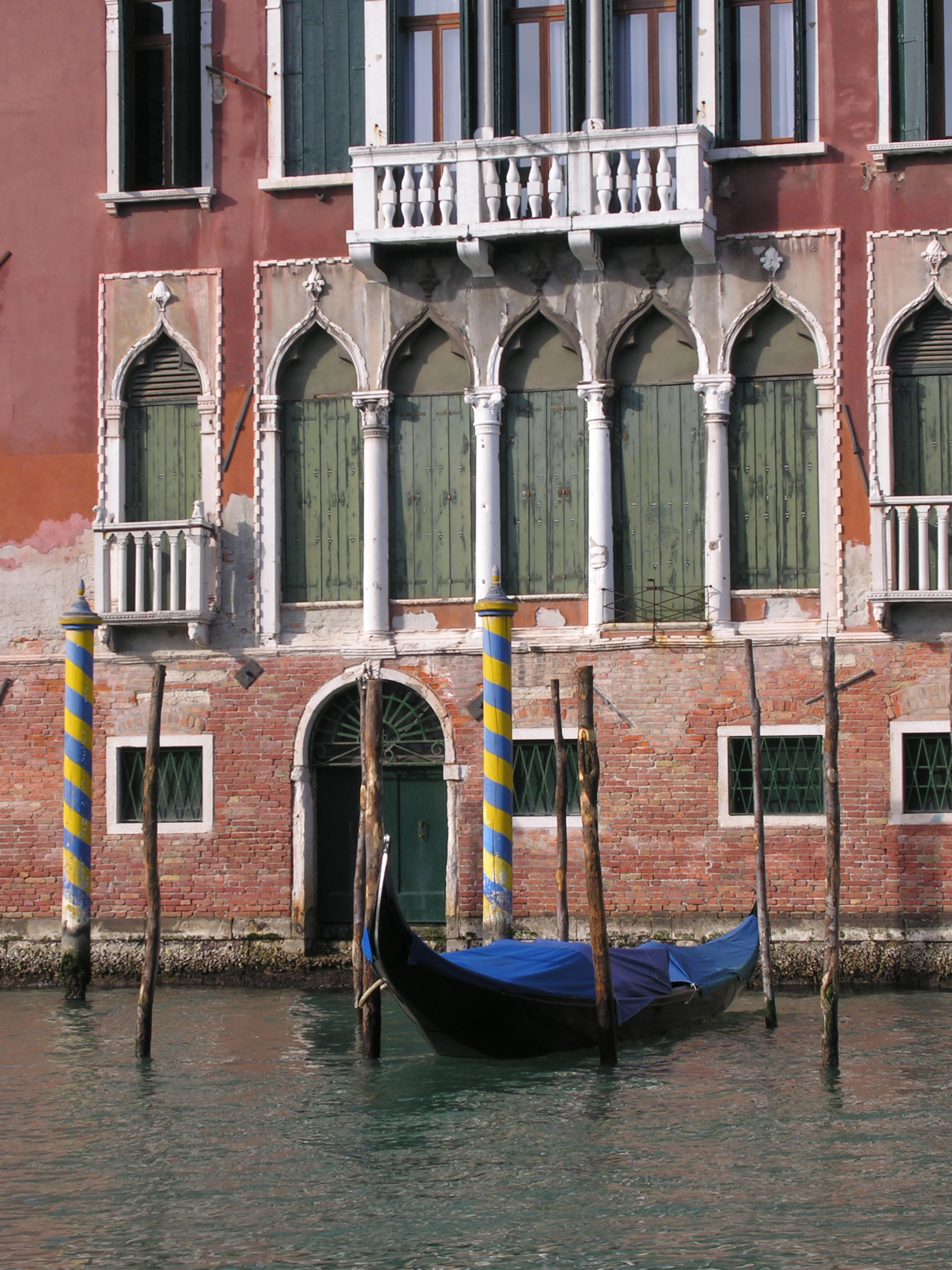
Ground floor

== See also ==
- Palazzo Soranzo Cappello
