= Pievescola =

- Frazione
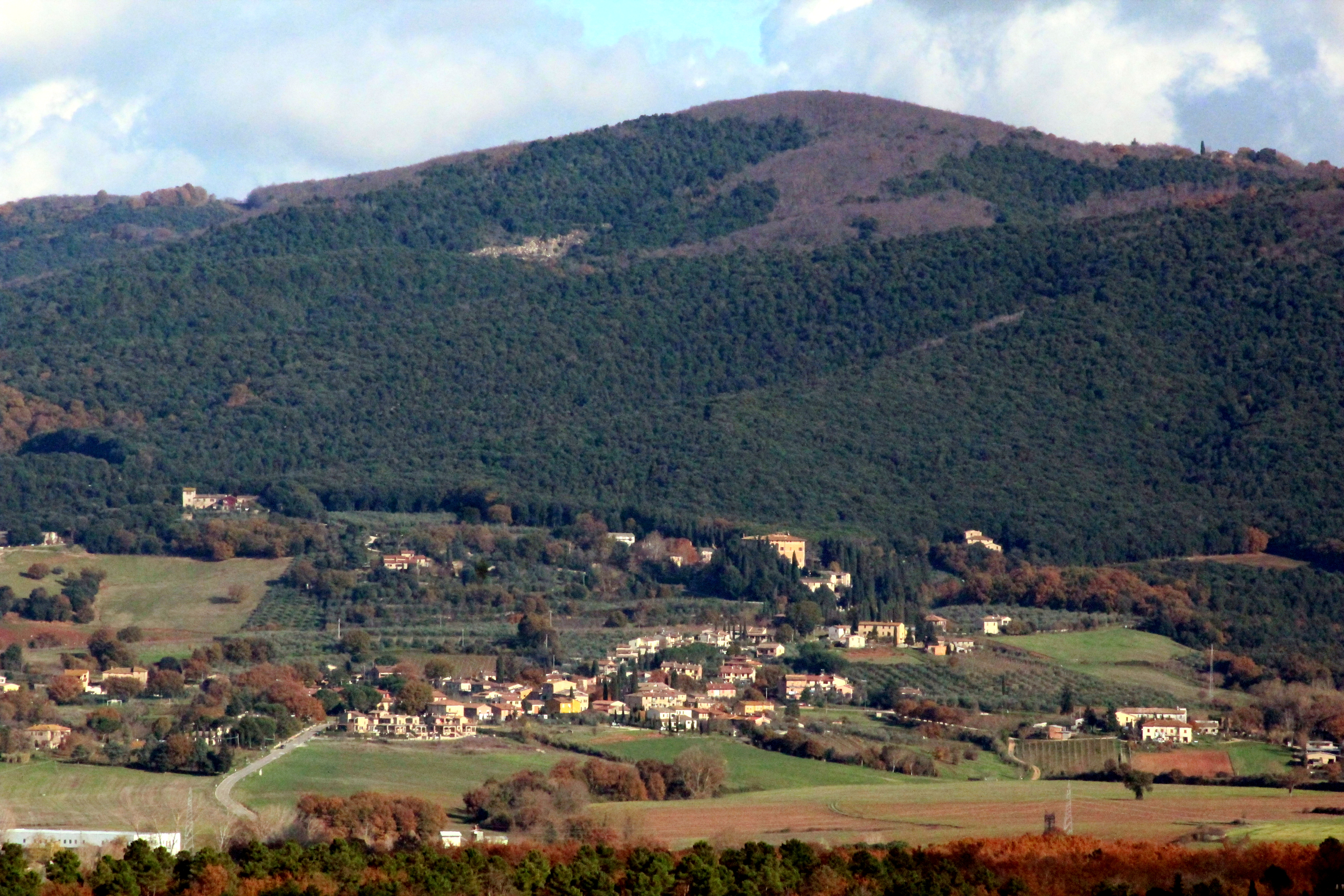
- View of Pievescola

- Location of Pievescola in Italy
- Coordinates: 43°18′40″N 11°7′53″E
- Country: Italy
- Region: Tuscany
- Province: Siena (SI)
- Comune: Casole d'Elsa
- Elevation: 272 m (892 ft)

Population (2011)
  - Total: 445
- Time zone: UTC+1 (CET)
  - Summer (DST): UTC+2 (CEST)

Pievescola is a village in Tuscany, central Italy, administratively a frazione of the comune of Casole d'Elsa, province of Siena. At the time of the 2001 census its population was 294.

Pievescola is about 24 km from Siena and 11 km from Casole d'Elsa.
