= Nigel Konstam =

British sculptor and art historian (1932–2022)

Nigel Konstam (8 December 1932 – 19 July 2022) was a British sculptor and art historian who has researched the history of art and lectured internationally on art historical subjects. He specialised in exploring the development of Man's ability to understand what he sees and challenged orthodoxy on important turning points in art history.

== Early life and education ==
Born in London in 1932, Nigel Konstam was educated at Radley College, where he excelled at Art. He studied sculpture under Dr Karel Vogel from 1956 to 1958 at Camberwell School of Art, later known as the Camberwell College of Arts, and briefly at the Royal College of Art in 1958.

== Career ==
Konstam became an active sculptor and bronze-caster, in parallel forging a career to explore the history of art, specializing in tracing the development of Man's ability to understand what he sees. He lectured on art historical subjects at the major art colleges in the United Kingdom also at Harvard in the US and PINC in the Netherlands.

Konstam was commissioned to make portraits of musicians including Otto Klemperer in 1982, Hans Hotter, Manoug Parikian and John Ireland (composer). Showing at The Cadogan Contemporary Gallery in London his carvings in alabaster are ordinarily on show or can be seen on request. He has drawings in the collection of The British Museum. He chaired the Contemporary Portrait Society in London between 1975 and 1980. In 2001 he exhibited in Pisa, in Florence in 2002 and Todi in 2011. In Spain he sculpted Portrait busts of Juan Carlos I of Spain and Queen Sofía of Spain.

Konstam moved to Italy in 1983. In Italy he set up and ran The Verrocchio Arts Centre in Casole d'Elsa in Casole d'Elsa. Within the Centre is the Museo Konstam a number of Konstam’s sculptures and drawings are displayed. Many of his larger works can be seen near La chiesa di San Niccolò and in the village of Casole d'Elsa. Also in the Museo Konstam resides The Research Centre for the True History of Art.

The main exhibits in the museum are demonstrations of artists' use of mirrors (for example Rembrandt, Velasquez, Vermeer and Brunelleschi). Also featured is the Roman tradition in European Art, Greek Life-casting and Bronze Casting technique, and includes medieval Seines sculpture and drawing artifacts. Konstam was an artist whose work was displayed in mixed exhibitions, and some solo ones in and around London though, notably, as far back as 1980, presented a major respective in Madrid with over 100 pieces on show followed by shows in Barcelona and Salamanca. He has revealed evidence that some aspects of the history of art are mistaken and challenged orthodoxy on important turning points in art history; namely the classical phase in Greece, the start of the Renaissance and around 1630 which he claims is the start of the modern era. One of his theories rejoined the debate about the Elgin Marbles. He argues in his books that the artefacts in the British Museum are Roman copies of the Greek originals. Roughly hewn out of the stone, the Greek would have contrasted sharply with the smoother marble finish made so famous by the London collectors.

Konstam died in Casole d'Elsa on 19 July 2022.

== Artistic analysis ==
A prime focus of Konstam was the exploration of the history of Man's ability to understand what he sees. Many of his relatively revolutionary ideas have been catalogued. Konstam claimed to have established two important contributions to the understanding of western art. The first was outlined in an article in The Apollo Magazine (Aug.1972) describing the geometric method by which a bust of Hadrian was copied into marble, arguing that this three-dimensional geometry was used by many artist, but in his research Konstam did not find evidence of any art historians referring to this technique as the basis for exploring solid and space. Thus Konstam produced evidence of a revised way to think about drawing; accomplished by recognising the two traditions of form making (Greek and Roman) and distinguishing between them. He has stated that a line drawn by Holbein or Rembrandt is not conceived in the same way as one by Raphael and his followers. Konstam’s understanding of Rembrandt was based on this different approach: that every mark Rembrandt makes relates to a position in space. Konstam noted this is the secret of Rembrandt’s success in capturing the spirit of the individual in his drawings and has stated that Rembrandt is the most transparent artist of whom he has researched.

Konstam also noted his concern that The British Museum had altered a particular bust stating that "he was shocked to see that the ear lobes of Hadrian (room 70) had been ‘restored’. … thus they have repaired the chips in both of Hadrian’s ears which constitutes the clearest demonstration of my thesis: that three dimensional geometry was used and loved by the Romans and many great artists since (Rembrandt owned 30 Roman portraits and filled two books with drawings of them)”

Konstam’s second contention was his discovery that ancient Greek sculpture was based on Life-casting, from approx 500BC onwards. This he has noted “could be regarded as shocking because it alters the foundations of art history as taught today e.g. Heinrich Wölfflin, Principles of Art History. The assumption has previously been that the Greeks arrived at their "Classical" phase by a leap of the imagination. Konstam has said “this version has less romantic appeal but is claimed to be the truth. He has documented that Lifecasting is why Greek stone sculptures show traces of being measured, but no explanation of what they were measured from. Life-casting explains why no sculptor since the Greeks has ever equaled their quality in terms of modeling veins or other small details of anatomy”.

== Rembrandt controversy ==
Konstam's article, "Rembrandt's Use of Models and Mirrors" was published in The Burlington Magazine February 1977 with the backing of Prof. Sir Ernst Gombrich. Benedict Nicolson, editor The Burlington, wrote in response "I find the evidence you have accumulated of the greatest possible interest, and so I am sure will Rembrandt scholars, who must now get down to revising the corpus of drawings!". Lawrence Gowing, from The Slade School of Fine Art at the time also wrote in support, noting “Your view of the division between objective and imaginative seems to me, artistically and psychologically, much more comprehensible and satisfactory than anything before.” A similar article appeared in Rembrandthuiskroniek 1978. Max Wykes-Joyce, in The International Herald Tribune, wrote, on 27 January 1976, of Konstam’s exhibition running at the Consort Gallery Imperial College to 13 February 1976 "... which, by implication, contradicts much of the 20th-century criticism and scholarship. As a working artist, the case he makes for the redating and reconsideration of many of Rembrandt's drawings is strong ... But certainly the exhibition is a seminal one which should not be lightly dismissed".

Prof. Bryan Coles, Professor of Liberal Studies at Imperial College wrote “these reconstructions (many of which compel assent) ... it would be a pity for scholarship not to profit from his (Konstam’s) imaginative researches”. Rembrandt was the first artist Konstam discovered to be using mirrors and similar usage by Diego Velázquez, Johannes Vermeer and Filippo Brunelleschi soon followed. The Konstam Maquette of Musicians comparative image is posited as solid evidence that Rembrandt used models and a mirror in the construction of his drawing of Four Musicians with Wind Instruments. The nearest flautist holds the flute the wrong way round and the oboist's hands are shown too close to the mouthpiece. This would not have occurred if the subject was drawn from true musicians. The second flautist has his instrument the right way round, proving the mirror reversal. Konstam has discovered 80 instances of this method of doubling the subject matter in Rembrandt's drawings. The Adoration of the Shepherds is the one instance where Konstam has found Rembrandt making two paintings, one from a mirror image and the other from life direct but both observed from the same position. Thus geometry is part of the proof.

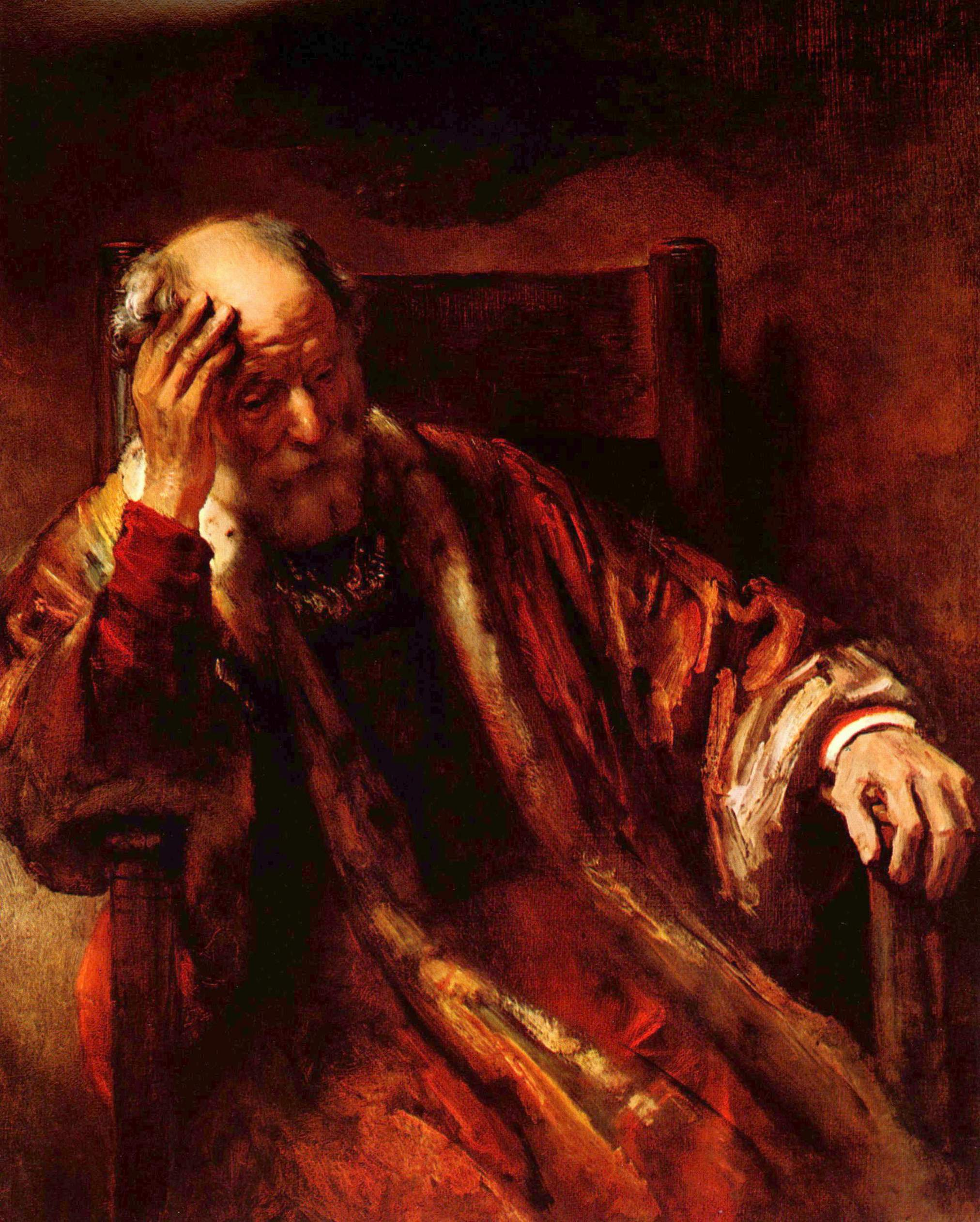
Rembrandt Harmensz. van Rijn: The Old Man Sitting in a Chair

By 1974 Konstam was contending he had proved the case that Rembrandt observed reality and reflections etc. to help create his masterpieces rather than using his imagination, the scholars' view, as noted in his eBook. Konstam wrote to the Rembrandt Research Project on two occasions vigorously requesting they reattributed “The Old Man Sitting in a Chair” to Rembrandt. His view was dismissed at the time by the Rembrandt Research Project. However, the project was terminated by the Rembrandt Research Project Board in 2011 and in 2014 Professor Ernst van de Wetering, once chairman of the Rembrandt Research Project an accepted 'authority', or in terms of connoisseurship, on Rembrandt, gave his opinion in an article in The Guardian that the demotion of the 1652 painting of the Old Man Sitting in a Chair "was a vast mistake...it is a most important painting. The painting needs to be seen in terms of Rembrandt's experimentation”. Not only is Van de Wetering convinced that Old Man in an Armchair is a genuine Rembrandt, but also that it is a pivotal work. “It is of wonderful quality and is revolutionary in a sense.” An earlier study ran counter to the view of Professor Ernst van de Wetering. Moreover, in 2014 the National Gallery reattributed the painting "to an unknown contemporary follower of Rembrandt, probably working in the 1650s", but sometime later circa 2016 the picture was re-labelled “Probably by Rembrandt” noting "it is not a portrait but a character study, a type of painting that lends itself to experimentation far more than a formal portrait would. It has been convincingly proposed that as such it in fact represents an important experimental step in Rembrandt’s development towards the rough manner of his later works."

In 2009 Konstam provided a demonstration of the London version of The Adoration of the Shepherds (also deattributed by the Rembrandt Research Project), noting that “it has to originate from a complex three dimensional group seen through a mirror”, the very group accepted as a Rembrandt in Munich. The National Gallery (London) subsequently reviewed their previous judgment and replaced the version they held, The Adoration of the Shepherds, among their Rembrandts, (see register 15 October. 2014–18 January 2015). It had previously been languishing in the basement since the Rembrandt Research Project had insisted it was a 17th-century variant of a version in Munich.

== Alternative approaches ==
Other contributors to the debate of techniques used by artists included on 8 March 2012 Tim's Vermeer, documentary film "Jan Vermeer and the Camera Obscura" which made the claim that a newly invented instrument, probably unknown to Vermeer1632 – 1675 in the Music Lesson 1664, thus disproving conclusively the previously thought idea that he used the camera obscura technique in this and other work. On 14 March 2014, David Hockney presented a BBC Documentary, Secret Knowledge - Part One featuring Phillip Steadman’s book Vermeer’s Camera.

Konstam disputed this in his third film on Vermeer, pointing out that Johan Vermeer died in debt had a large family and would have needed a very large studio (over 6m in length) whereas Konstam's explanation needs only a small studio of just over 3 m. Furthermore, the image from a 17th-century camera is impractically small and weak. Konstam also noted the strange way of viewing Filippo Brunelleschi's first experiment in perspective, which he claimed was easily explained following Manetti's description precisely.

== Later developments ==
Konstam offered a summary of his contention in the Journal of Information Ethics published by McFarland Books in 2015. His assertion was that 'Rembrandt specialists' have subconsciously determined to convert the artist to 20/21st Century mores or contemporary beliefs; the preference for imagination over observation whereas Rembrandt's contemporaries all insisted "he observed, anything else was worthless in his eyes". Konstam noted that Rembrandt was very much a part of his time, "born into the middle of the revolution in science which started with Copernicus and Galileo; a revolution based on the rejection of the hypothetical philosophy inherited from the Greeks, Aristotle in particular, and relied instead on careful observation, measurement and logical deduction from the data." He argued that Rembrandt embodies the same spirit in art, insisting that direct observation was the mainstay of Rembrandt’s achievement and that contemporary understanding of the nature of the visual imagination is misguided. Konstam espoused his theory in a YouTube film.
