= Cathleen Chaffee =

American curator

Cathleen Ann Chaffee
- Born: United States
- Education: Ithaca College, The Courtauld Institute of Art, New York University Institute of Fine Arts
- Occupations: Curator, writer, art historian, artistic director
- Organization: Buffalo AKG Art Museum (formerly Albright-Knox Art Gallery)

Cathleen Chaffee is an American curator, writer, and art historian specializing in contemporary art. She serves as the artistic director, co-directing the Buffalo AKG Art Museum (formerly the Albright–Knox Art Gallery) in Buffalo, New York, where she joined in January 2014.

== Early life and education ==
Chaffee attended Ithaca College; followed by study at Courtauld Institute of Art where she received a M.A. degree; and the New York University Institute of Fine Arts where she received a Ph.D. in 2013. Her dissertation was Décors: Marcel Broodthaers's Late Exhibition Practice, 1974-1975, and her advisor was Robert Storr.

== Biography ==
Chaffee was Assistant Curator at the Yale University Art Gallery from 2010 to 2013 in New Haven; and held curatorial positions at the Museum of Modern Art from 2007 to 2008 in New York City and the Cleveland Museum of Art from 2001 to 2004.

In 2023, Chaffee curated Marisol: A Retrospective (in 2023–2025), the largest posthumous survey of the artist's work. The exhibition was largely drawn from Marisol's bequest of more than 700 artworks, her papers, and her copyright to the Buffalo AKG in 2016. In Buffalo, Chaffee oversees the museum's stewardship of Marisol's estate.

In 2024-25, Chaffee curated Stanley Whitney: How High the Moon, Whitney's first retrospective. This project was preceded by Stanley Whitney: the Italian Paintings (in 2022), (co-curated by Chaffee and Vincenzo de Bellis) an installation of works made by Stanley Whitney in Italy since the 1990s and an official collateral event of the 59th Venice Biennale.

Other notable exhibitions include Introducing Tony Conrad: A Retrospective (in 2018), the first large-scale museum survey devoted to artworks Conrad presented in museum and gallery settings, and part of an ongoing reappraisal of his creative achievement; Joe Bradley (in 2017); Clyfford Still / Mark Bradford (in 2016); Erin Shirreff (in 2016); Eija-Liisa Ahtila: Ecologies of Drama (from 2015 to 2016); Screen Play: Life in an Animated World (in 2015); Overtime: The Art of Work (in 2015); and Looking at Tomorrow: Light and Language from The Panza Collection, 1967–1990 (from 2015 to 2016).

She was awarded a Curatorial Fellowship from the VIA Art Fund in 2018; and a Fulbright Fellowship in 2008 to Belgium. Chaffee is a 2026 fellow at the Center for Curatorial Leadership.

== Publications ==
- Chaffee, Cathleen (2024). Stanley Whitney: How High the Moon. New York and Buffalo: DelMonico Books and Buffalo AKG Art Museum.
- Chaffee, Cathleen (2023). Marisol: A Retrospective. New York and Buffalo: DelMonico Books and Buffalo AKG Art Museum. ISBN 9781636811017.
- Chaffee, Cathleen; de Bellis, Vincenzo (2022). Stanley Whitney: The Italian Paintings. Buffalo, NY: Buffalo AKG Art Museum.
- Wilson, Julia Bryan; Chaffee, Cathleen; Adamson, Glenn; Sherman, Elisabeth (2022). Liza Lou (artist monograph). Carrie Mae Weems (contributor). New York City, NY: Rizzoli Electa. ISBN 978-0847870752.
- Gray, Zoë; Kuri, Gabriel; Chaffee, Cathleen; Snauwaert, Dirk (2020). Gabriel Kuri: Sorted, Resorted. Cologne: Walther König. ISBN 978-3960986850.
- Chaffee, Cathleen, ed. (2018). Introducing Tony Conrad: A Retrospective (art exhibition). Rachel Adams (author), Diedrich Diederichsen (author), Branden Wayne Joseph (author), David Grubbs (author), Jay Sanders (author), Constance DeJong (author), Vera Alemani (author), Tina Rivers Ryan (author), Annie Ochmanek (author), Andrew Lampert (author), Christopher Müller (author), Tony Oursler (contributor), Anthony Elms (author), Henriette Huldisch (author), Paige Sarlin (author), Christopher Williams (author). Albright-Knox Art Gallery. ISBN 9783960983361.
- Andersson, Andrea, ed. (2018). Postscript: Writing After Conceptual Art. Toronto: University of Toronto Press. ISBN 9781442649842.
- Chaffee, Cathleen, ed. (2017). Joe Bradley (art exhibition). Albright-Knox Art Gallery. ISBN 9781887457224.
- Cherix, Christophe; Borja-Villel, Manuel, eds. (2016). Marcel Broodthaers: A Retrospective (art exhibition). Marcel Broodthaers (artist), Benjamin Buchloh (contributor), Cathleen Chaffee (contributor), Jean-François Chévrier (contributor), Kim Conaty (contributor), Thierry de Duve (contributor). New York City, NY: The Museum of Modern Art. ISBN 978-0870709623.
- Chaffee, Cathleen; Colard, Jean-Max (2016). Erica Baum: The Naked Eye (art exhibition). Erica Baum (photographer). Crevecœur/Bureau. ISBN 978-2954136943.
- Hatley, Pam (2015). Erin Shirreff. Albright Knox Art Gallery. ISBN 978-1-887457-18-7.
- Chaffee, Cathleen, ed. (2015). Eija-Liisa Ahtila: Ecologies of Drama: Essays, Interviews, and Scripts. Eija-Liisa Ahtila (artist). Buffalo: Albright-Knox Art Gallery.
- Butler, Cornelia H.; Chaffee, Cathleen; Roberts, Veronica; Sullivan, Lexi Lee (2015). Drawing Redefined. DeCordova Museum and Sculpture Park. ISBN 978-0-300-21591-5.
- Chaffee, Cathleen, ed. (2013). Eye on a Century: Modern and Contemporary Art from the Charles B. Benenson Collection at the Yale University Art Gallery (art exhibition). New Haven, CT: Yale University Art Gallery. ISBN 978-0300184945.
- Chaffee, Cathleen (2013). Hanne Darboven's Abstract Correspondence. New York: Leo Castelli Gallery.
- Gross, Jennifer R.; Chaffee, Cathleen (2012). Richard Artschwager! (art exhibition). Bioethics Series. Adam D. Weinberg (contributor), Ingrid Schaffner (contributor), Richard Artschwager (artist). Whitney Museum of American Art. ISBN 9780300185317.
- Chaffee, Cathleen (2013). Carol Bove: The Middle Pillar. New York: Karma.
- van den Bossche, Phillip; Chaffee, Cathleen; Cherix, Christophe; Dippel, Rini; Feldman, Paula; Rattemeyer, Christian (2009). Cherix, Christophe; Liese, Jennifer (eds.). In & Out of Amsterdam: Travels in Conceptual Art, 1960-1976. New York City, NY: Museum of Modern Art. ISBN 978-0870707537.

== See also ==
- Women in the art history field
