= Mensano =

- Frazione
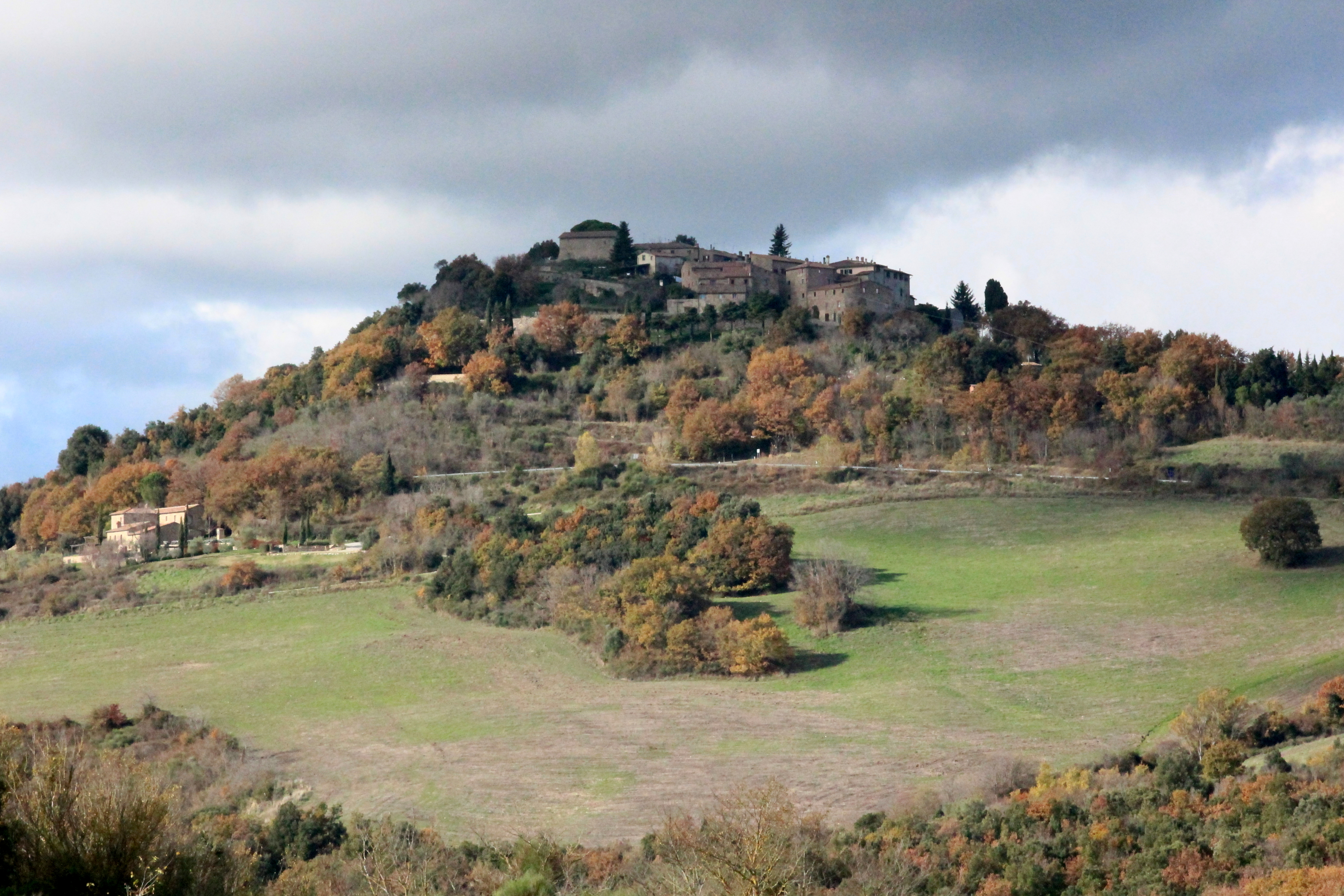
- View of Mensano

- Location of Mensano in Italy
- Coordinates: 43°18′3″N 11°3′14″E
- Country: Italy
- Region: Tuscany
- Province: Siena (SI)
- Comune: Casole d'Elsa
- Elevation: 499 m (1,637 ft)

Population (2011)
  - Total: 185
- Demonym: Mensanesi
- Time zone: UTC+1 (CET)
  - Summer (DST): UTC+2 (CEST)

Mensano (Italian pronunciation: [menˈsaːno]) is a village in Tuscany, central Italy, administratively a frazione of the comune of Casole d'Elsa, province of Siena. At the time of the 2001 census its population was 127.

Mensano is about 36 km from Siena and 8 km from Casole d'Elsa.

== Main sights ==
- San Giovanni Battista, main parish church of the village
