= Palazzo Soranzo Cappello =

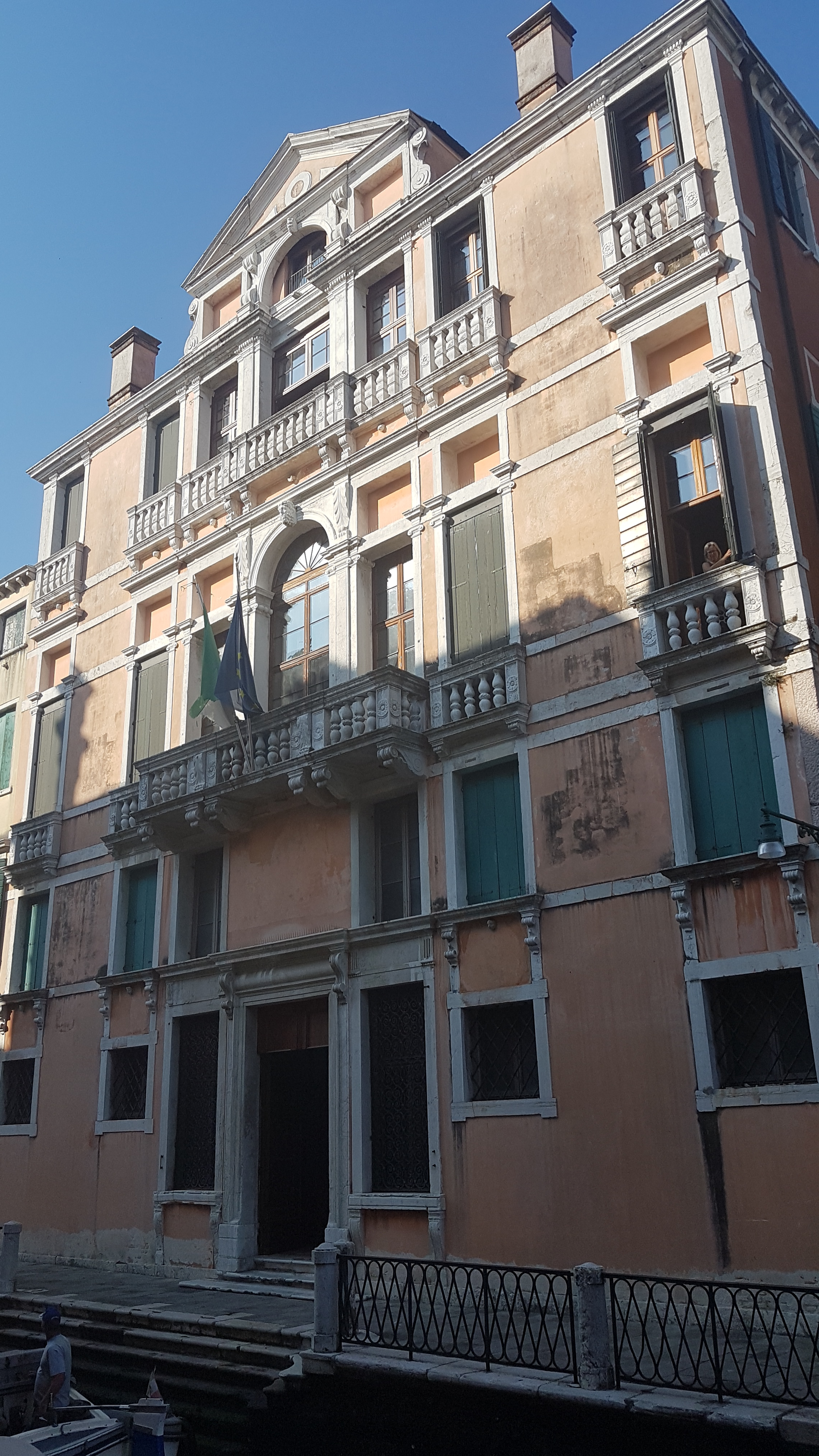
- Palazzo Soranzo Cappello
- Interactive map of the Palazzo Soranzo Cappello area

General information
- Type: Residential
- Architectural style: Baroque
- Location: Santa Croce district, Venice, Italy
- Coordinates: 45°26′23.94″N 12°19′27.99″E
- Construction stopped: 16th century

Technical details
- Floor count: 4

Palazzo Soranzo Cappello is a palace in Venice, Italy located in the Santa Croce district, near Palazzo Gradenigo. The palace is currently occupied by the Superintendence of Archaeology, the Fine Arts and Landscape for the metropolitan area of Venice and the provinces of Belluno, Padua and Treviso.

== History ==
The palace was built in the late 16th century by the powerful Soranzo family. The style is similar to that of Michele Sanmicheli. Subsequently, the palazzo passed through numerous families. For some time it was used as a barracks. After a few decades of neglect in the 20th century, the building has been restored.

== Architecture ==
The facade, facing the Rio Marin, is of four levels with a mezzanine and two noble floors. The first noble floor is decorated with an elegant serliana with white-stone inserts and a balustrade. Both noble floors are underlined by stringcourse cornices, standing out of the pink plaster wall. There is a gable in the central part of the top floor, terminating with a tympanum. Two small chimneys replace those that originally were two high pinnacles. The interior has valuable paintings and decorative works. The palazzo has a garden, which was mentioned in the works of poet Gabriele D'Annunzio and writer Henry James—the palazzo, in fact, seems to be the one in which the stories of Il fuoco (1900) and The Aspern Papers (1888) are respectively set.

== Gallery ==
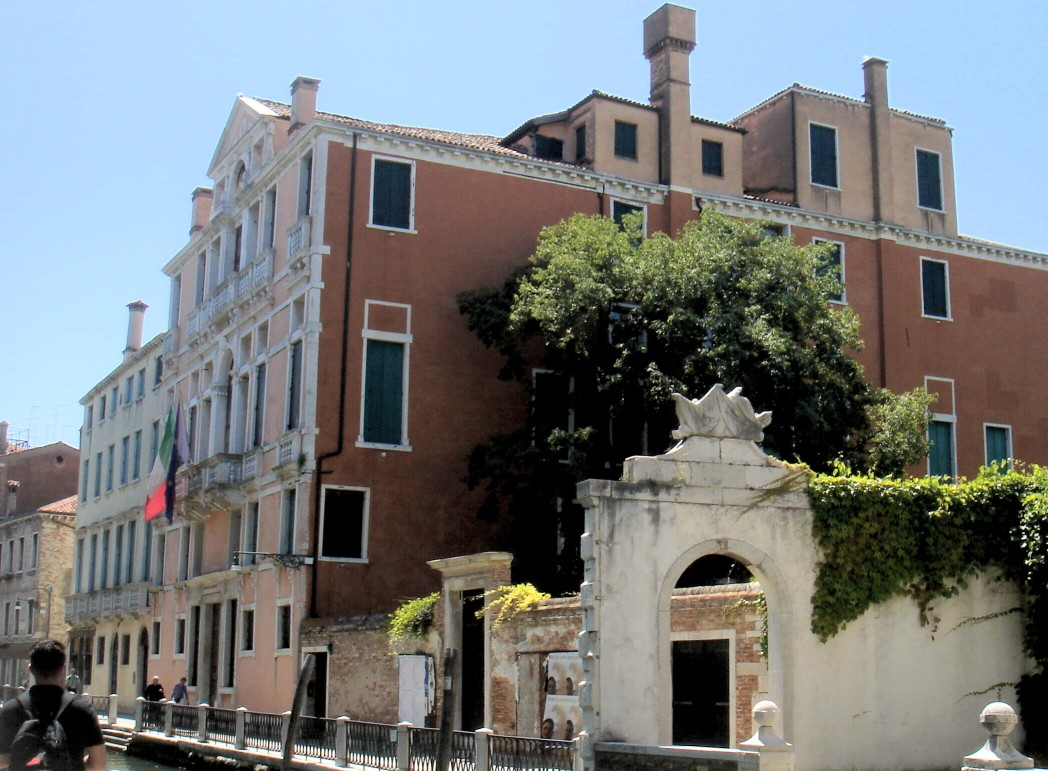
Side view on the facade

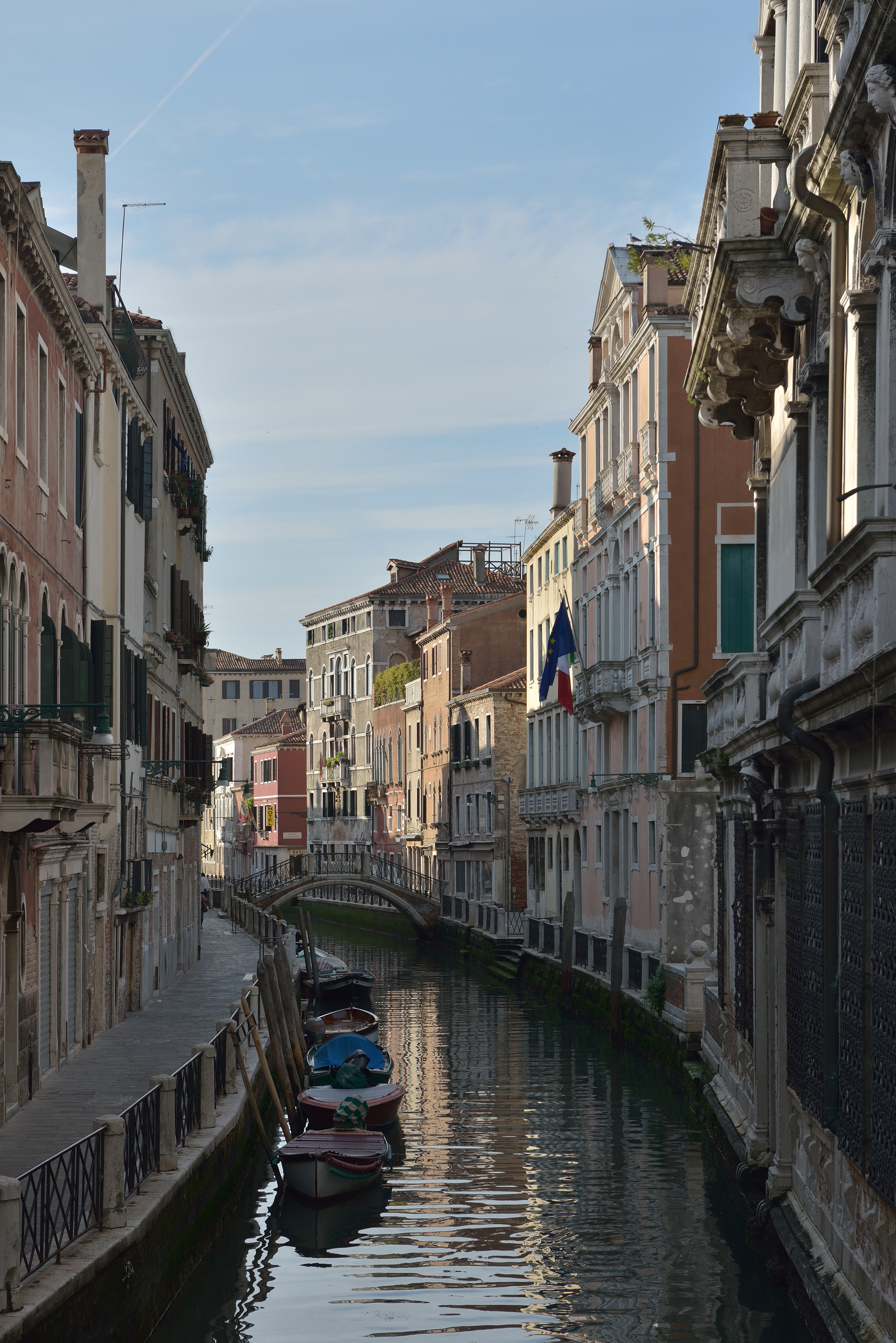
Fondamenta Rio Marin

== See also ==
- Palazzo Soranzo Pisani
