= Monteguidi =

- Frazione
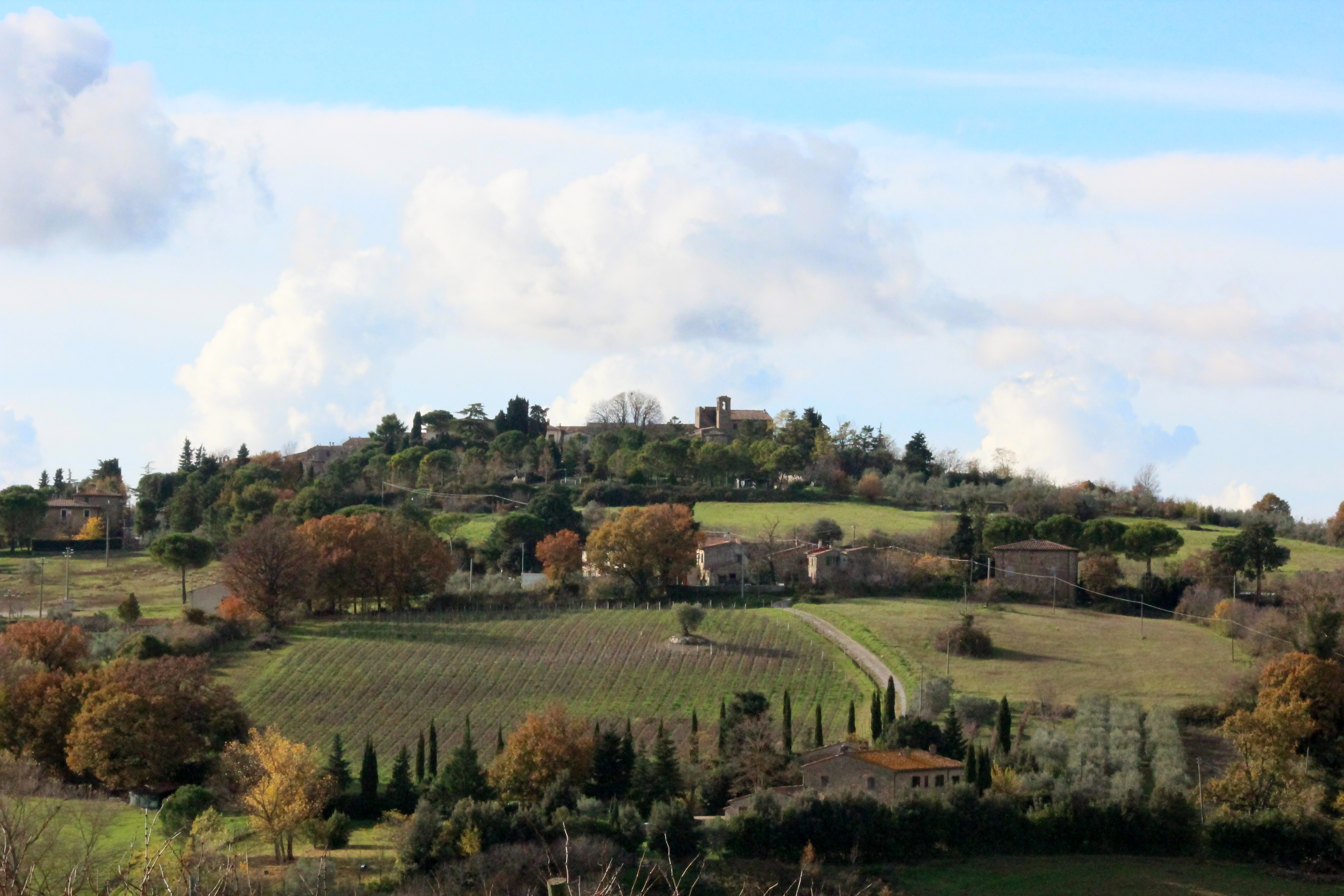
- View of Monteguidi

- Location of Monteguidi in Italy
- Coordinates: 43°17′48″N 11°00′30″E
- Country: Italy
- Region: Tuscany
- Province: Siena (SI)
- Comune: Casole d'Elsa
- Elevation: 421 m (1,381 ft)

Population (2011)
  - Total: 144
- Demonym: Monteguidesi
- Time zone: UTC+1 (CET)
  - Summer (DST): UTC+2 (CEST)

Monteguidi is a village in Tuscany, central Italy, administratively a frazione of the comune of Casole d'Elsa, province of Siena. At the time of the 2001 census its population was 147.

Monteguidi is about 40 km from Siena and 10 km from Casole d'Elsa.
