= Palazzo Tiepolo Passi =

Coordinates: 45°26′09″N 12°19′44″E

The Palazzo Tiepolo Passi is a Venetian Gothic-style palace located between the Palazzo Giustinian Persico and the Palazzo Soranzo Pisani on the Grand Canal, in the Sestieri of San Polo, Venice, Italy. The neighboring building is Palazzo Soranzo Pisani.

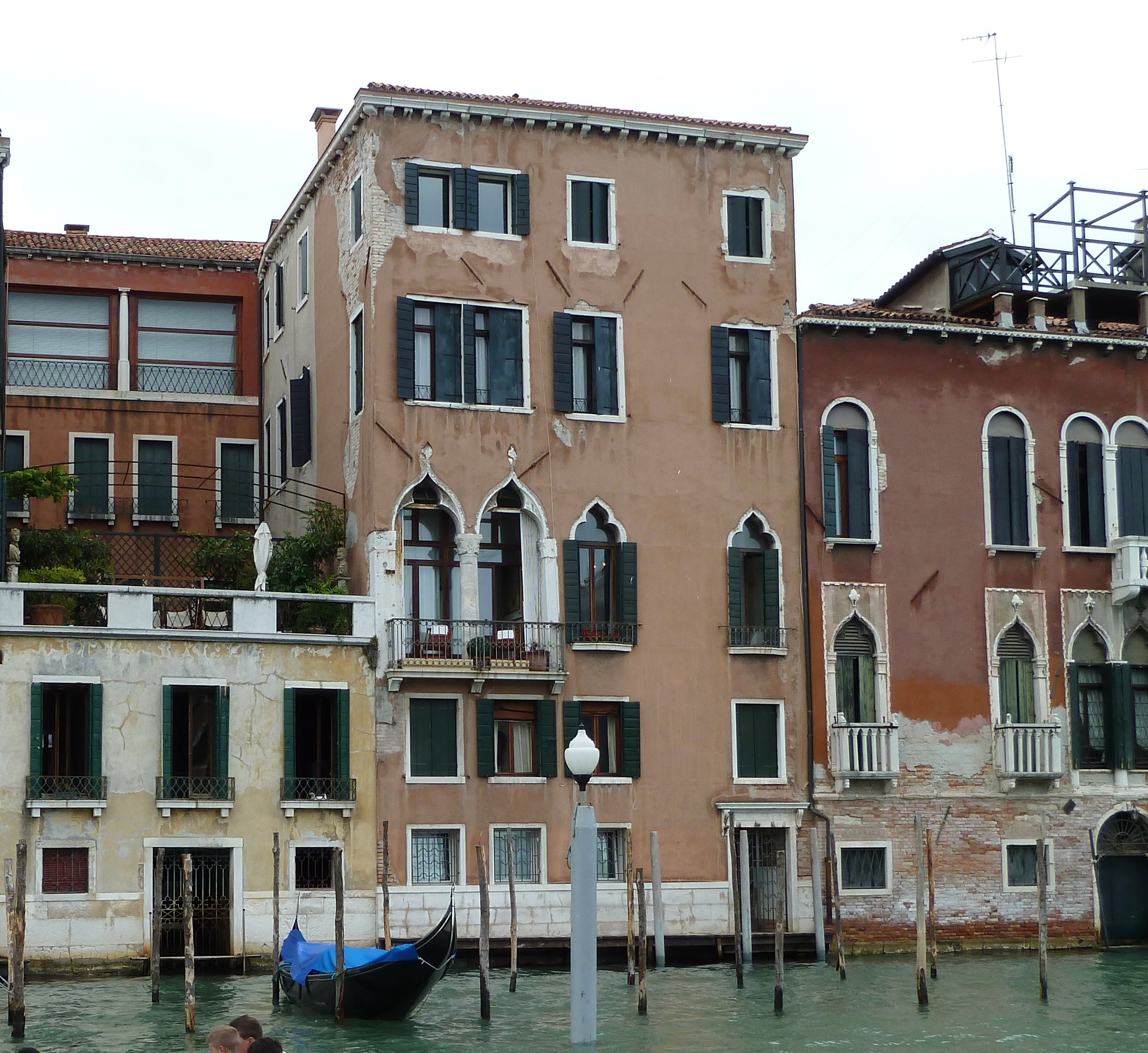
Palazzo Tiepolo Passi

== History ==
The narrow asymmetric palace was commissioned in the 14th century. It has undergone modern refurbishment.
