= Casole d'Elsa =

- Comune
- Comune di Casole d'Elsa
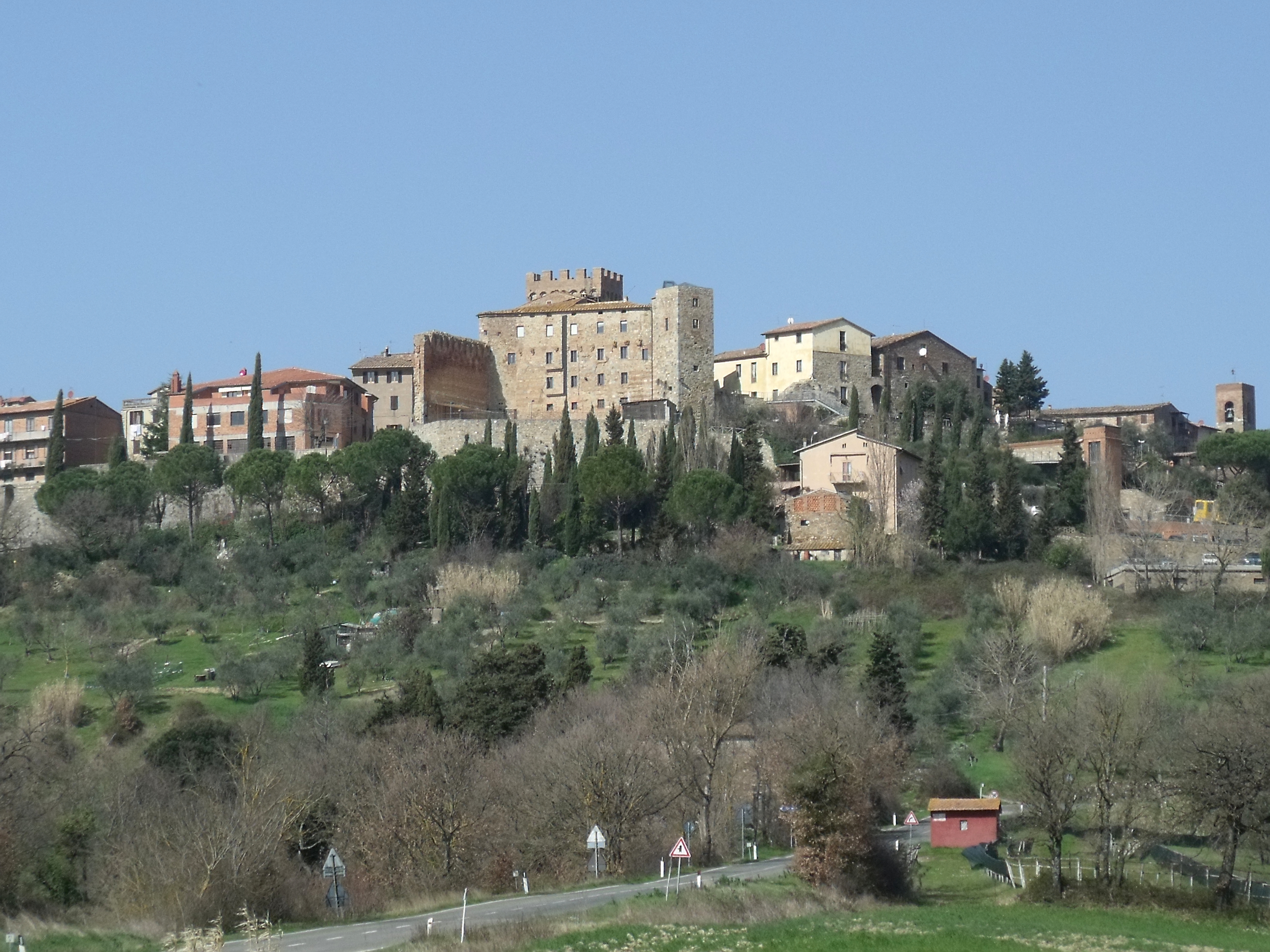

- Coat of arms

- Location within Italy Location within Tuscany
- Coordinates: 43°20′N 11°3′E
- Country: Italy
- Region: Tuscany
- Province: Siena (SI)
- Frazioni: Cavallano, Mensano, Monteguidi, Pievescola

Government
  - Mayor: Andrea Pieragnoli

Area
  - Total: 148.69 km^{2} (57.41 sq mi)
- Elevation: 417 m (1,368 ft)

Population (31 May 2017)
  - Total: 3,875
  - Density: 26.06/km^{2} (67.50/sq mi)
- Demonym: Casolesi
- Time zone: UTC+1 (CET)
  - Summer (DST): UTC+2 (CEST)
- Postal code: 53031
- Dialing code: 0577
- Patron saint: St. Donatus
- Saint day: 7 August
- Website: comune.casoledelsa.si.it

Casole d'Elsa [ˈkaːzole] is a comune (municipality) in the Province of Siena in the Italian region Tuscany, located about 50 kilometres (31 mi) southwest of Florence and about 25 kilometres (16 mi) west of Siena.

== Main sights ==
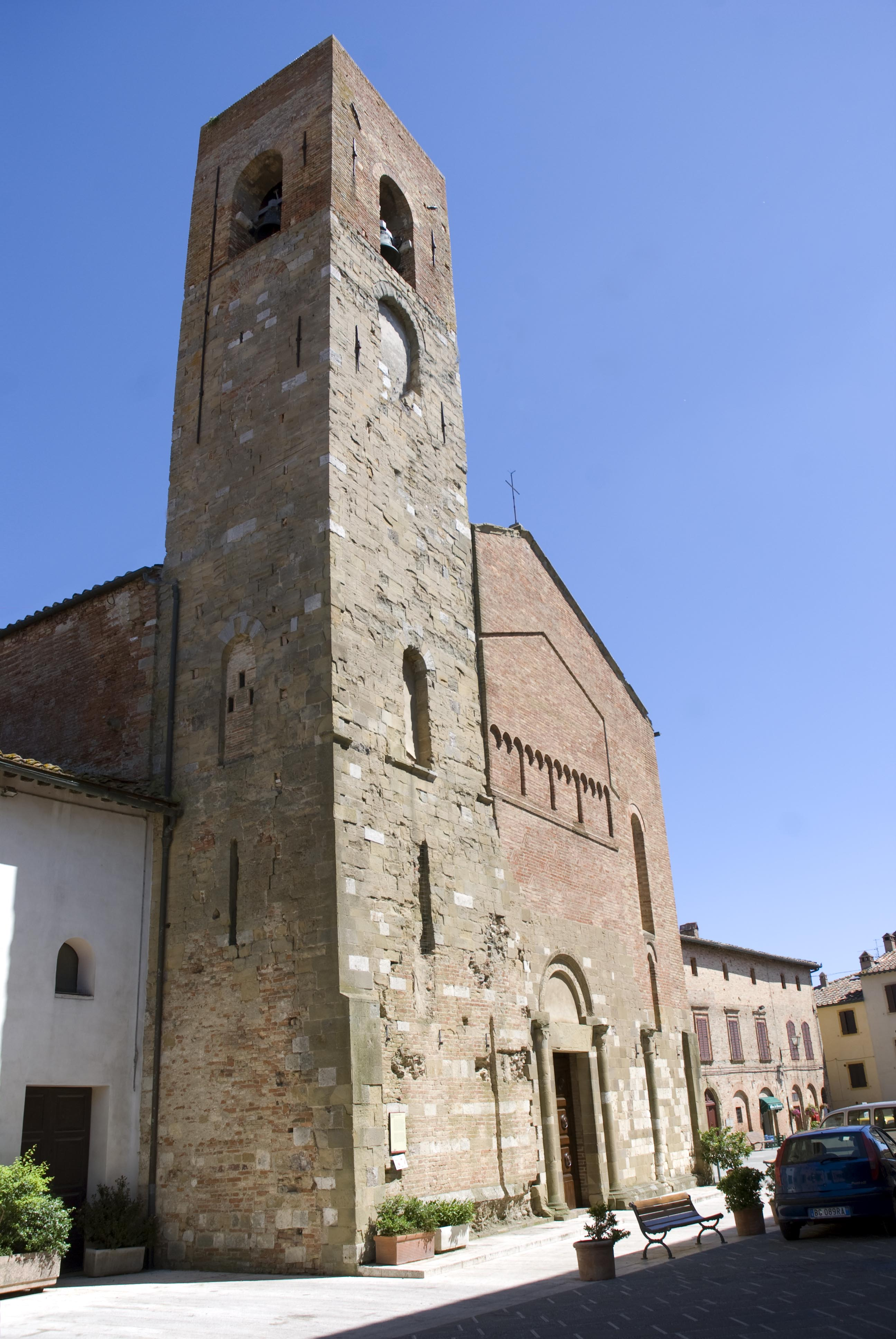
Façade of the Collegiata of Santa Maria Assunta

The church of San Niccolò, of Romanesque origin, has a nave and four aisles divided by columns and semicolumns, with two semicircular apses with mullioned windows. The central portal is from the early 14th century, while the portico is modern. It has 17th-century frescoes by Rustichino and, at the high altar, one 14th century Madonna of the Sienese School.

The collegiata di Santa Maria Assunta was consecrated in 1161; of the original Romanesque edifice, the façade remains with the bell tower. The upper part is decorated with blinds arches divided by slender semicolumns. The transept is from the 14th century. The interior houses the tombs of Beltramo Aringhieri, by Marco Romano (early 14th century), and of bishop Tommaso Andrei, by Gano di Fazio (1303). Annexed to the church is a Museum of Sacred Art with works by Domenico di Michelino, Alessandro Casolani and others.

The Pieve of San Giovanni Battista, at Mensano, is also from the 12th century. Notable are the sculpted capitals of the columns dividing nave and aisles, considered amongst the finest examples of Romanesque sculpture in the Siena area. From the same period and style is the Pieve di San Giovanni Battista, at Pievescola.

Casole d'Elsa is also home to the world-renowned Verrocchio Art Centre offering fine art courses, painting holidays, sculpture courses, studios and accommodation. Nigel Konstam is the resident director and a sculptor whose work is firmly based in the European tradition.

The village is the base of the MotoGP Racing group called Ducati Pramac, that won the 2024 Moto GP title with Jorge Martín.

== Sources ==
- Frati, M.; A. Mennucci; M. Ristori; C. Spagnuolo (1996). Chiese medievali della Valdelsa. I territori della via Francigena tra Siena e San Gimignano. Empoli: Editori dell’Acero.
