= San Simeone Profeta =

Church in Venice

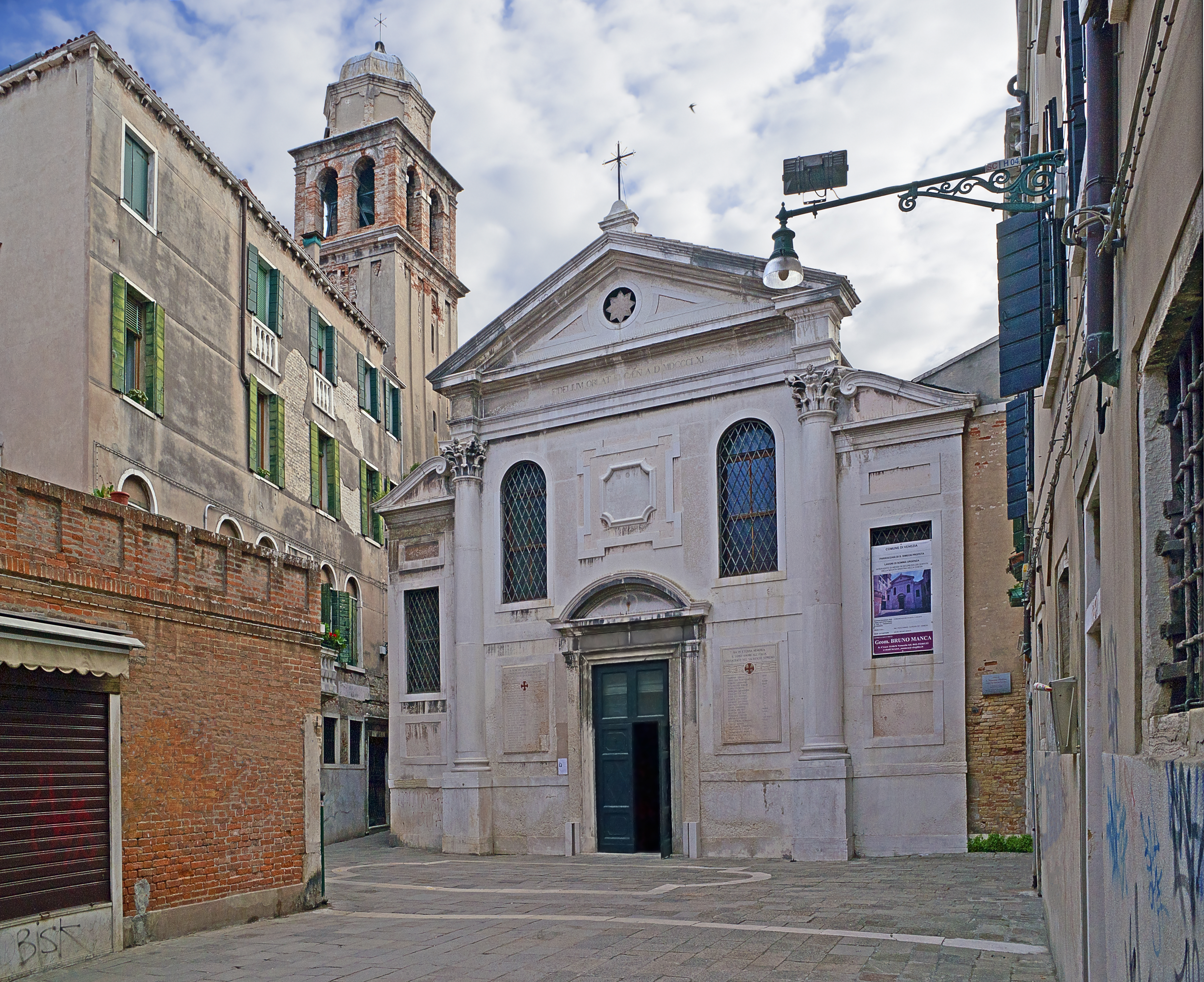
- San Simeone Prophet

- Location within Venice Location within Italy

Religion
- Affiliation: Roman Catholic
- Province: Venice

Location
- Location: Venice, Italy
- Coordinates: 45.44069°N 12.32452°E

Architecture
- Completed: 967

San Simeone Profeta, also known as San Simeone Grande, is a church in the sestiere of Santa Croce in Venice, Italy. The adjective Grande distinguishes this church from the San Simeone Piccolo, which was smaller in size until its 18th-century reconstruction. The near palaces are Palazzo Gradenigo and Palazzo Soranzo Cappello.

== History ==
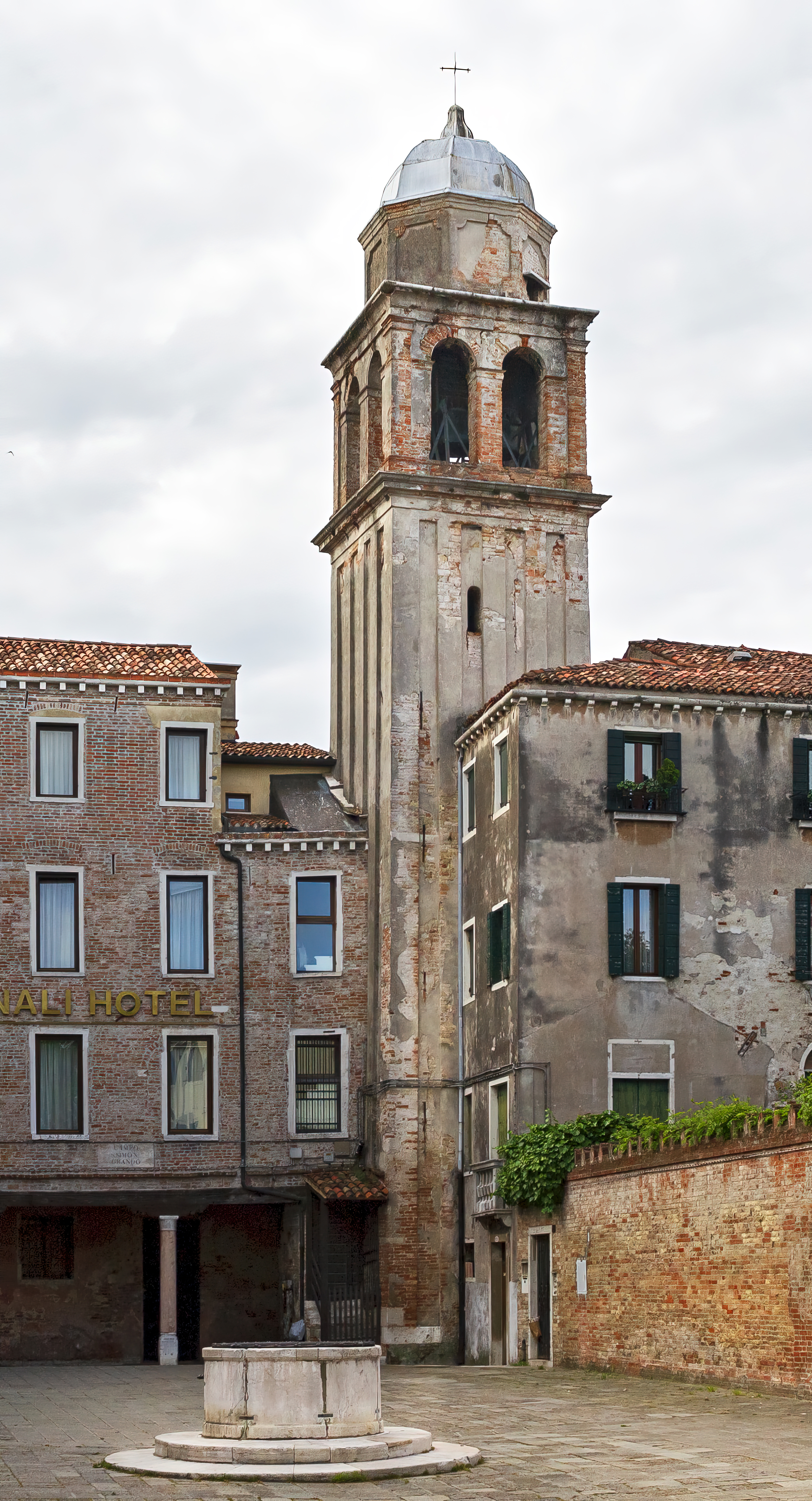
Bell tower

This church was founded by 967 by the patrician families of Ghisi, Adoldi and Briosi. Originally a modest building of wood, after a fire in 1150, it was rebuilt in stone and made parish church. The Napoleonic government joined the parish to that of San Simeone Piccolo

== Description ==
The interior floor appears to have been raised after burials were pursued here during the plague of 1630. The current church has a plain neoclassical façade. The interior was rebuilt in the early eighteenth century by Domenico Margutti. Inside, to the right of the entrance, is a Presentation at the Temple with portraits of donors by Jacopo Palma the Younger. In the second altar of the left nave is a Last Supper by Tintoretto. The Annunciation, previously attributed to Palma the Younger is today recognized as a work of the painter Blanc.
