= The Flame (novel) =

1900 novel by Gabriele D'Annunzio

The Flame (Italian: Il fuoco) is a 1900 novel by the Italian writer Gabriele D'Annunzio. It is set in 1883 Venice and tells the story of a young artist and his mistress, a famous but quickly aging actress. The story was inspired by D'Annunzio's relationship with the actress Eleonora Duse. The novel contains expositions of many of D'Annunzio's theories about drama, largely inspired by Friedrich Nietzsche and Richard Wagner.

The novel was published in English in 1900 as The Flame of Life. A new translation was published in 1991 as The Flame.

It was conceived as the first part in a trilogy, The Novels of the Pomegranate (Romanzi del melograno), but the two other books were never written.
