= Edith Lucile Howard =

American artist (1885–1959)

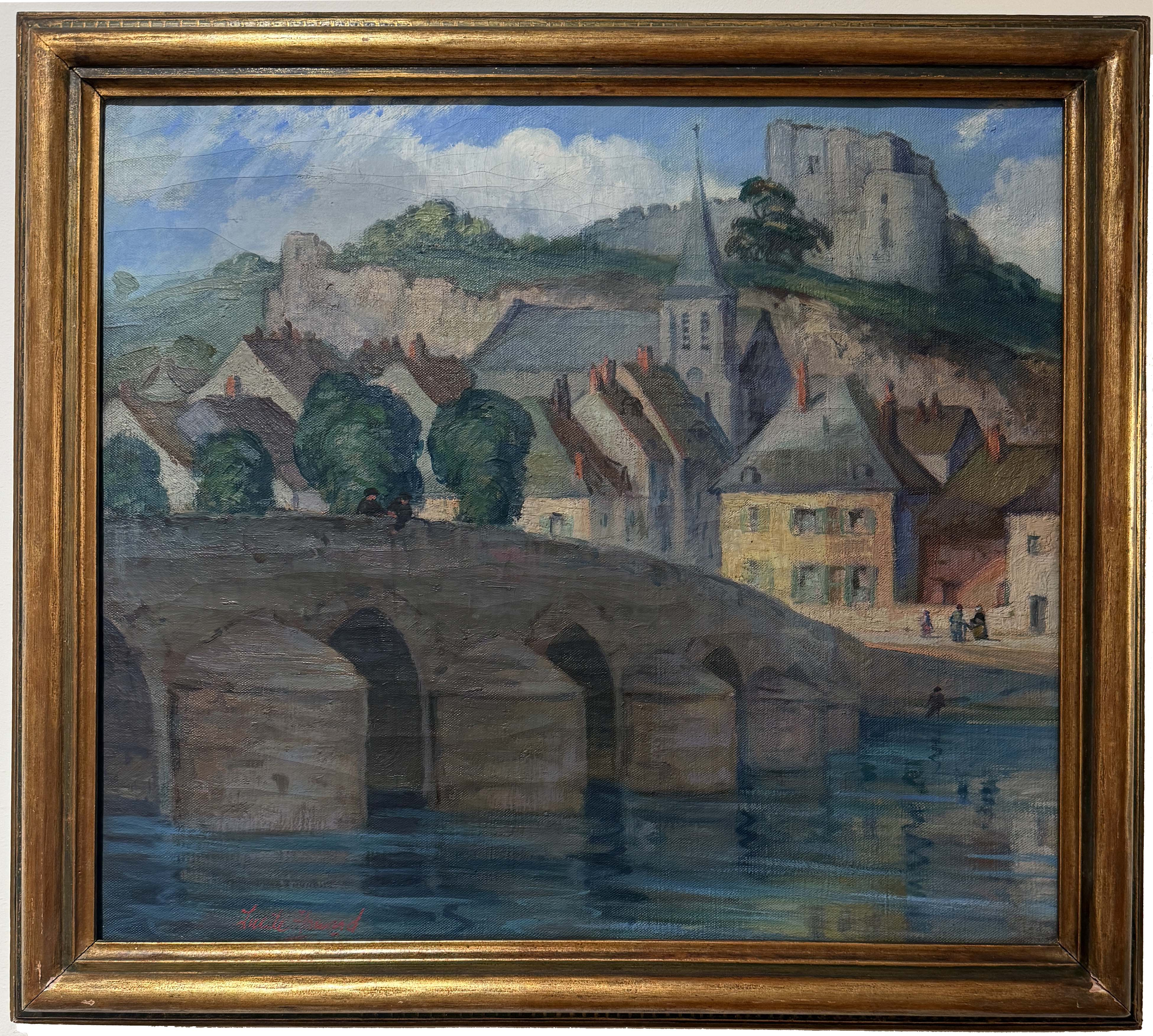
Oil on Canvas, 16" × 20", Edith Lucile Howard, SLL

Edith Lucile Howard (1885–1959) was an American landscape artist. She was born in Bellow Falls, Vermont, and died of cancer in Moorestown, New Jersey, in 1959.

== Philadelphia Ten ==
Edith Howard was a founder and member of the Philadelphia Ten. The Philadelphia Ten was exclusive to women artist and sculptors, active from 1917 to 1945. A partial list of members includes, Eleanor Abrams, Katharine Marie Barker, Theresa Bernstein, Cora S. Brooks, Isabel Branson Cartwright, Constance Cochrane, Mary-Russell Ferrell Colton, Arrah Lee Gaul, Lucile Howard, Helen Kiner McCarthy, Katharine Hood McCormick, Maude Drein Bryant, Fern Coppedge, Nancy Maybin Ferguson, Margaret Ralston Gest, Sue May Gill, Susette Schultz Keast, Marian T. MacIntosh, Emma Fordyce MacRae, Mary Elizabeth Price, Elizabeth Wentworth Roberts, Susan Gertrude Schell, Edith Longstreth Wood, Gladys Edgerly Bates, Cornelia Van Auken Chapin, Beatrice Fenton, Harriet Whitney Frishmuth, Genevieve Karr Hamlin, Joan Hartley, and Mary Louise Lawser.

== Career ==
Howard studied with Henry B. Snell and Elliott Daingerfield at the Philadelphia School of Design for Women, which is now called the Moore College of Art & Design. Howard entered college at the age of nineteen and received her diploma in 1908. Her first exhibition was at the Worcester Art Museum in 1914. She taught at the School of Design for Women, Grand Central Art Galleries and School of Art in New York and retired in 1949.

== Exhibitions ==
Exhibition of water color paintings selected from The Exhibition of The Philadelphia Water Color Club. February 1 to 23, 1914.

Under the name of "Lucille Howard", Edith Lucille Howard authored an article about the work of young fashion students inspired by artifacts in the University of Pennsylvania Museum of Archeology and Anthropology (September 1920)
