= Moore College of Art and Design =

Private art and design college in Philadelphia, Pennsylvania

Moore College of Art & Design
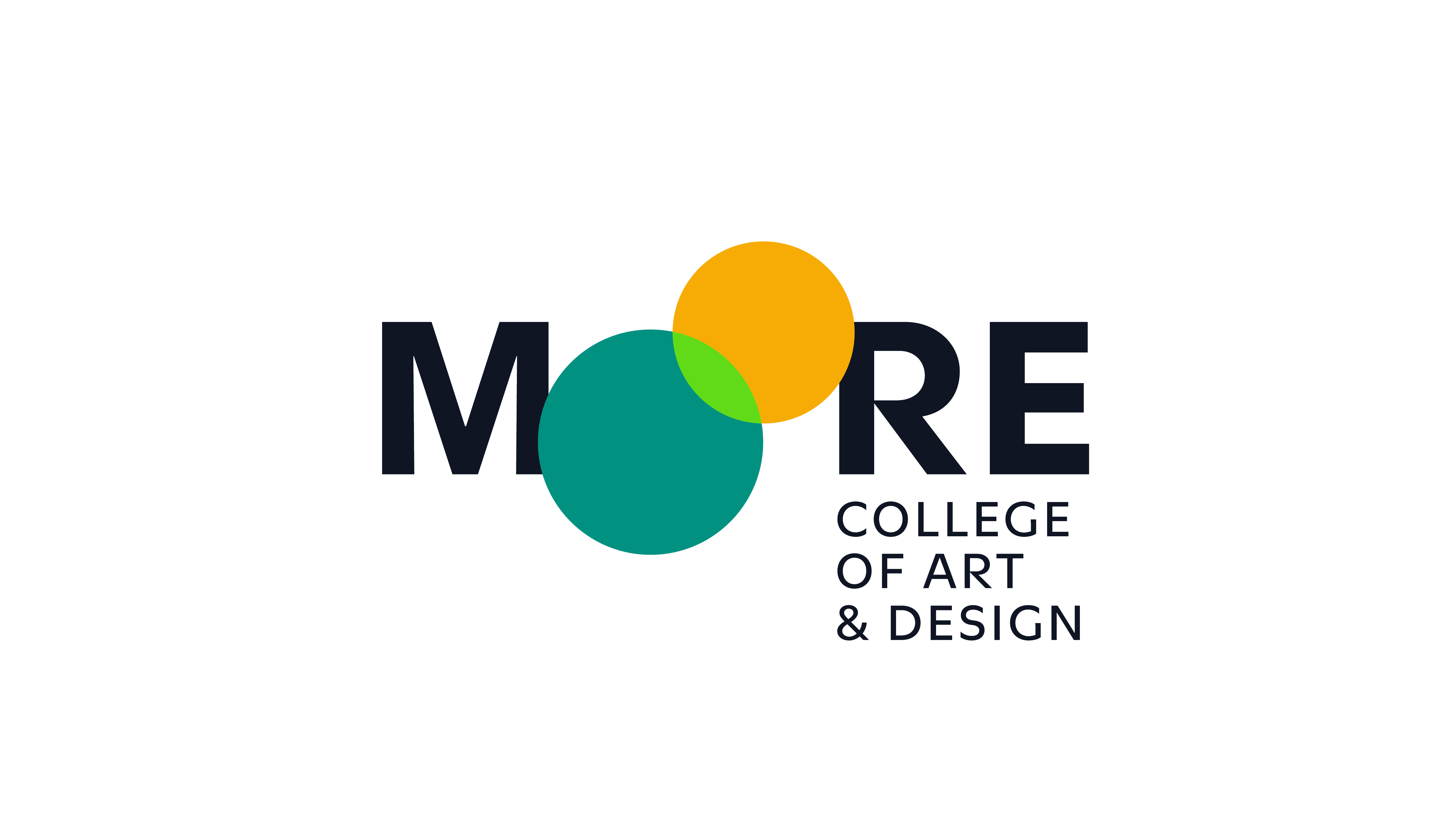
- Type: Private art school
- Established: 1848; 178 years ago
- President: Cathy Young
- Undergraduates: Approximately 500
- Location: Philadelphia, Pennsylvania, United States
- Campus: Urban
- Website: www.moore.edu

Moore College of Art & Design is a private art school in Philadelphia, Pennsylvania. It was founded in 1848 by Sarah Worthington Peter as the Philadelphia School of Design for Women, and was renamed Moore College of Art & Design in 1989. Although the school's undergraduate programs were historically only open to women, Moore's board voted to open admission to all genders in 2026, with the new policy planned to be in effect for the 2027-28 academic year. Its other educational programs, including graduate programs and youth programs, are co-educational.

== History ==
=== Philadelphia School of Design for Women ===
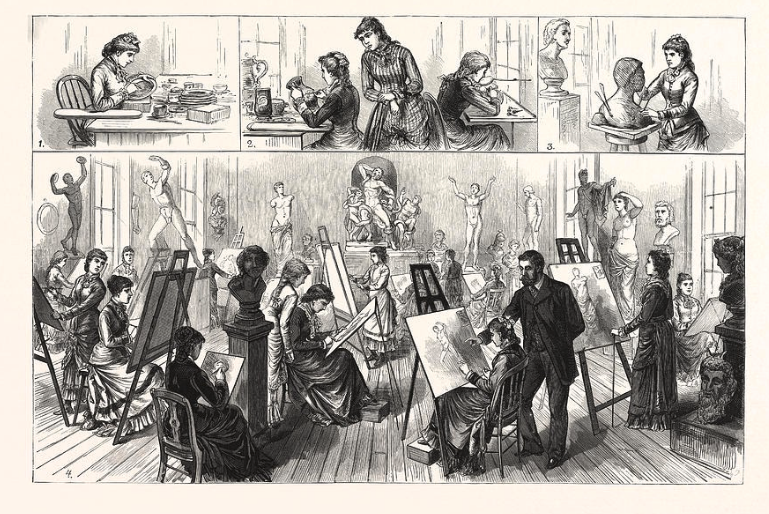
Classes at the Philadelphia School of Design for Women, 1880

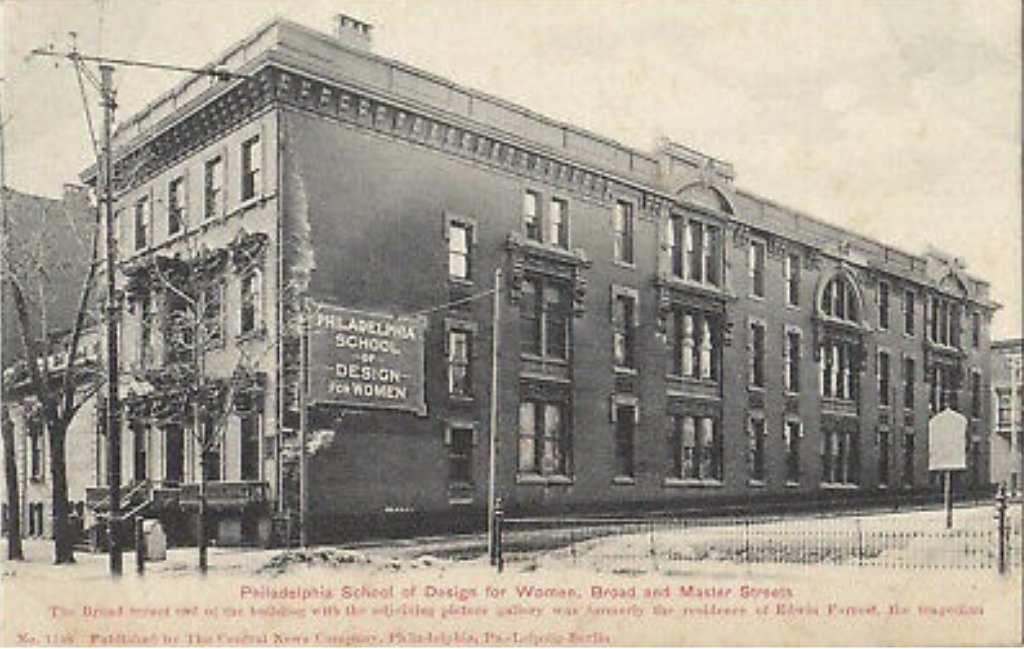
The Philadelphia School of Design for Women was located at 1326 North Broad Street beginning in 1880.

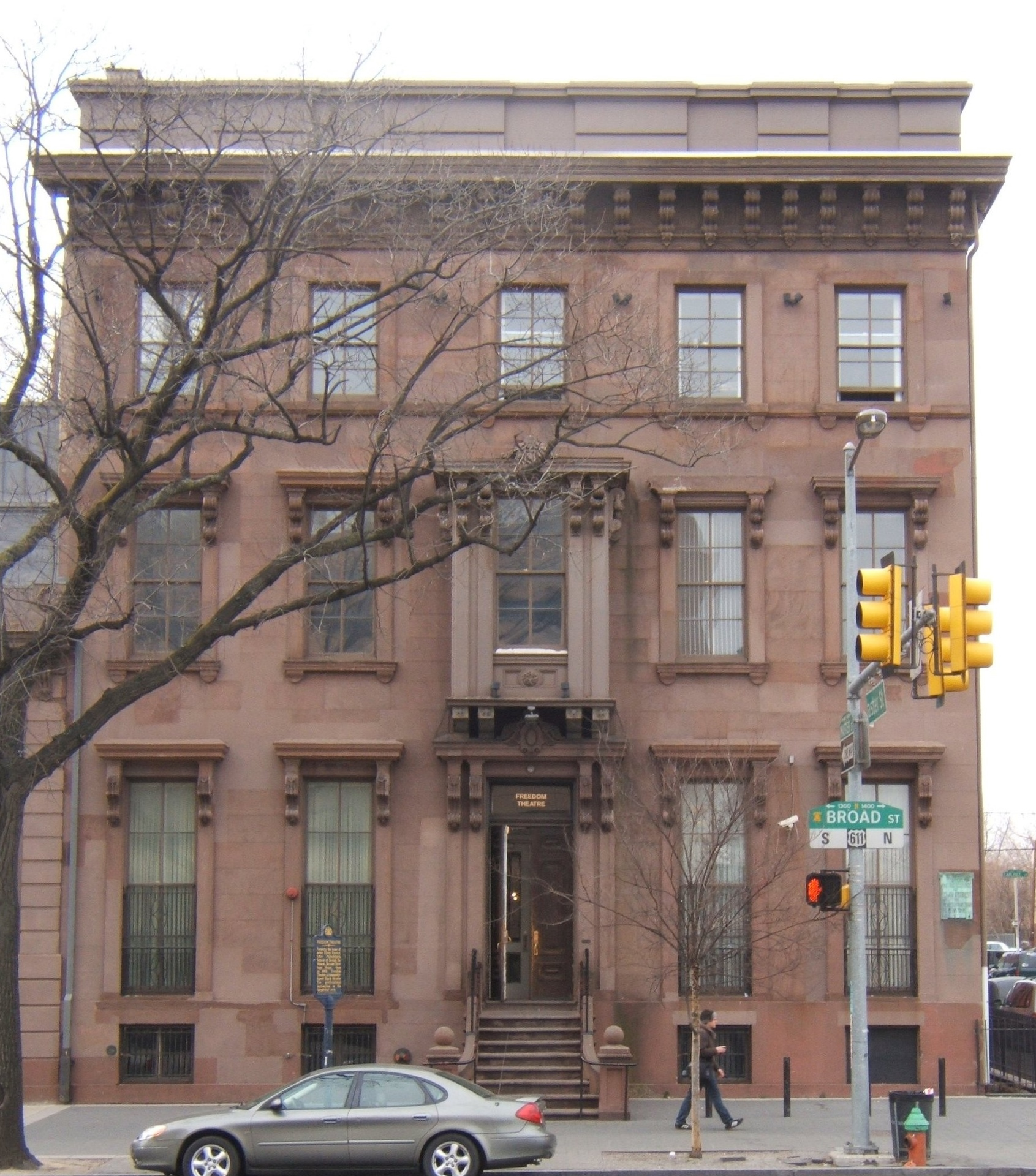
The building is now known as the Edwin Forrest Mansion, and has housed Freedom Theatre since 1968.

Founded in 1848 by Sarah Worthington Peter as the Philadelphia School of Design for Women, it was the first women's art school in the United States. Peter initially operated the school from a room in her home on South Third Street at her own expense. The school was established to prepare women to work in the new industries created during the Industrial Revolution, of which Philadelphia was a center. Instruction began with a drawing class taught by a single teacher, but classes in wood engraving, lithography, china painting, and other subjects were soon added. As the school continued to grow, Peter wrote to Samuel V. Merrick, president of the Franklin Institute, to propose “a connection of my school” with the organization. The Franklin Institute supported the school from 1850 to 1853 before it became an independent chartered institution of its own.

By 1863, the Philadelphia School of Design for Women secured enough financial support to purchase a building at the corner of Broad and Filbert Streets. When the Pennsylvania Railroad bought the building for a new station, the school's board used the money to purchase its new home at the Edwin Forrest Mansion on Broad and Master Streets.

The mansion, which housed the school from 1880 to 1959, offered larger spaces for classes, exhibitions, and social events. As the school continued to expand, it opened dormitories on Race Street to bring students closer to the cultural and artistic attractions near the Benjamin Franklin Parkway. The dormitories were eventually demolished to make room for an entirely new campus on the parkway.

The first principal of the school was drawing teacher Anne Hill, who held the position from 1850 until her death in 1852. She was replaced by Elizabeth Speakman, a 25-year-old art teacher. Speakman's credentials were called into question by designer Thomas Braidwood in February 1853, leading to a period of contention over the administration of the school between Sarah Peter and a committee from the Franklin Institute. Thomas Braidwood returned two years later as principal, and served in the position from 1856 to 1873. Elizabeth Croasdale took over as principal in 1873. At the beginning of Croasdale's tenure, older women comprised the majority of students, but demographics began to shift to younger women throughout her time as principal. Emily Sartain took over as principal in 1886.

Several members of the Sartain family played a large role in the development of the Philadelphia School of Design for Women. John Sartain, an engraver, was elected to the board of directors in 1868, serving as board vice president from 1873 to 1887. Emily Sartain, his daughter, served as principal for 33 years, retiring in 1920. Beginning in 1887, Emily's brother, William, also taught a portrait painting class at the school.

John's granddaughter and Emily's niece, Harriet Sartain, who graduated from the Philadelphia School of Design for Women in 1892, took over as the school's first dean in 1920. By the time Harriet took over for Emily, the school said it had trained about 11,000 women in fine and applied arts.

Although it is unclear why the administrative title changed, Harold Rice became the school's first president in 1947, remaining in the position until 1963. The title of the administrative head of the school has remained “president” or “acting president” since 1947. In 2022, Cathy Young became president.

=== Moore College of Art & Design ===
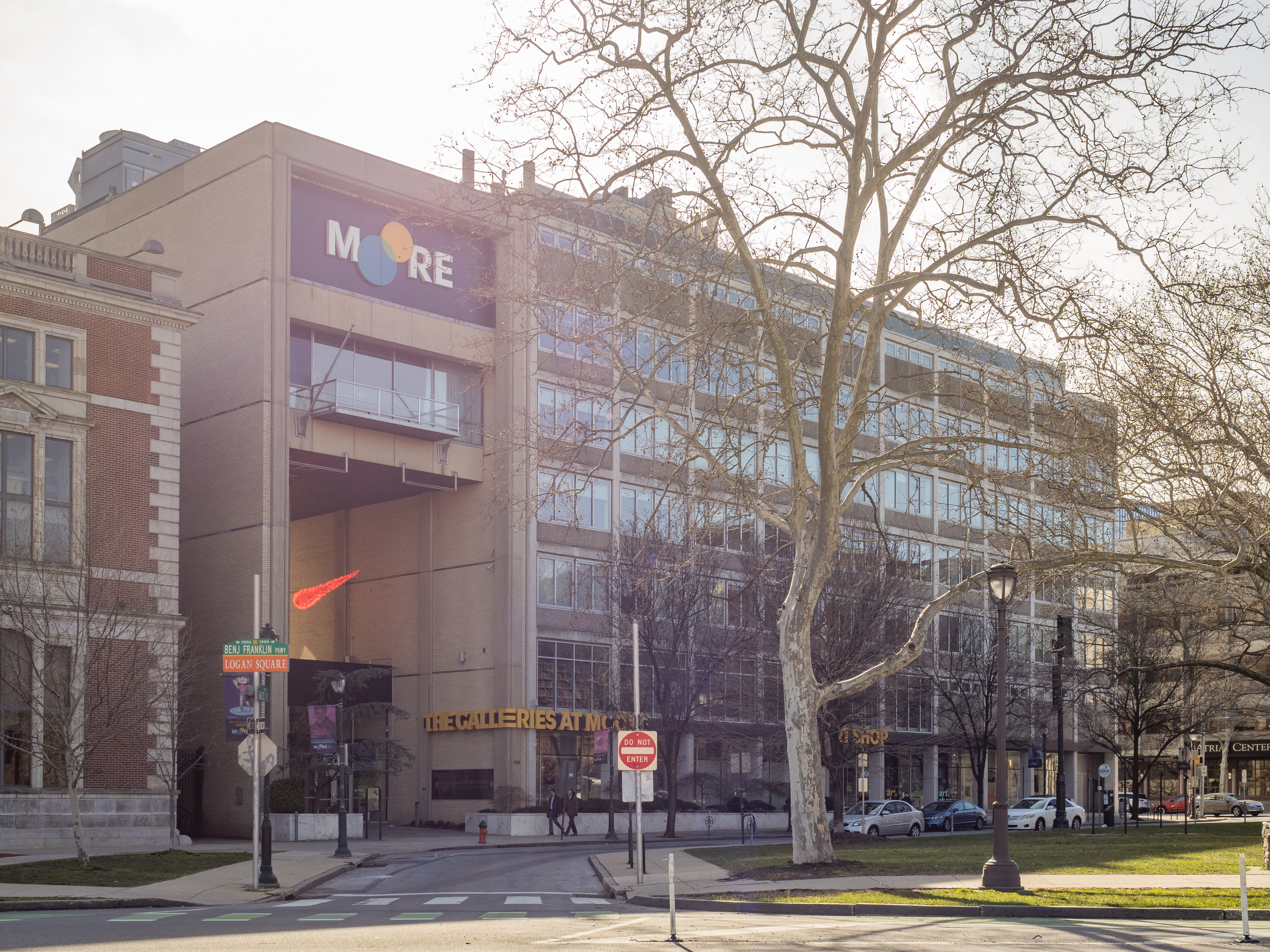
Moore College building at 20th Street and the Parkway in Philadelphia

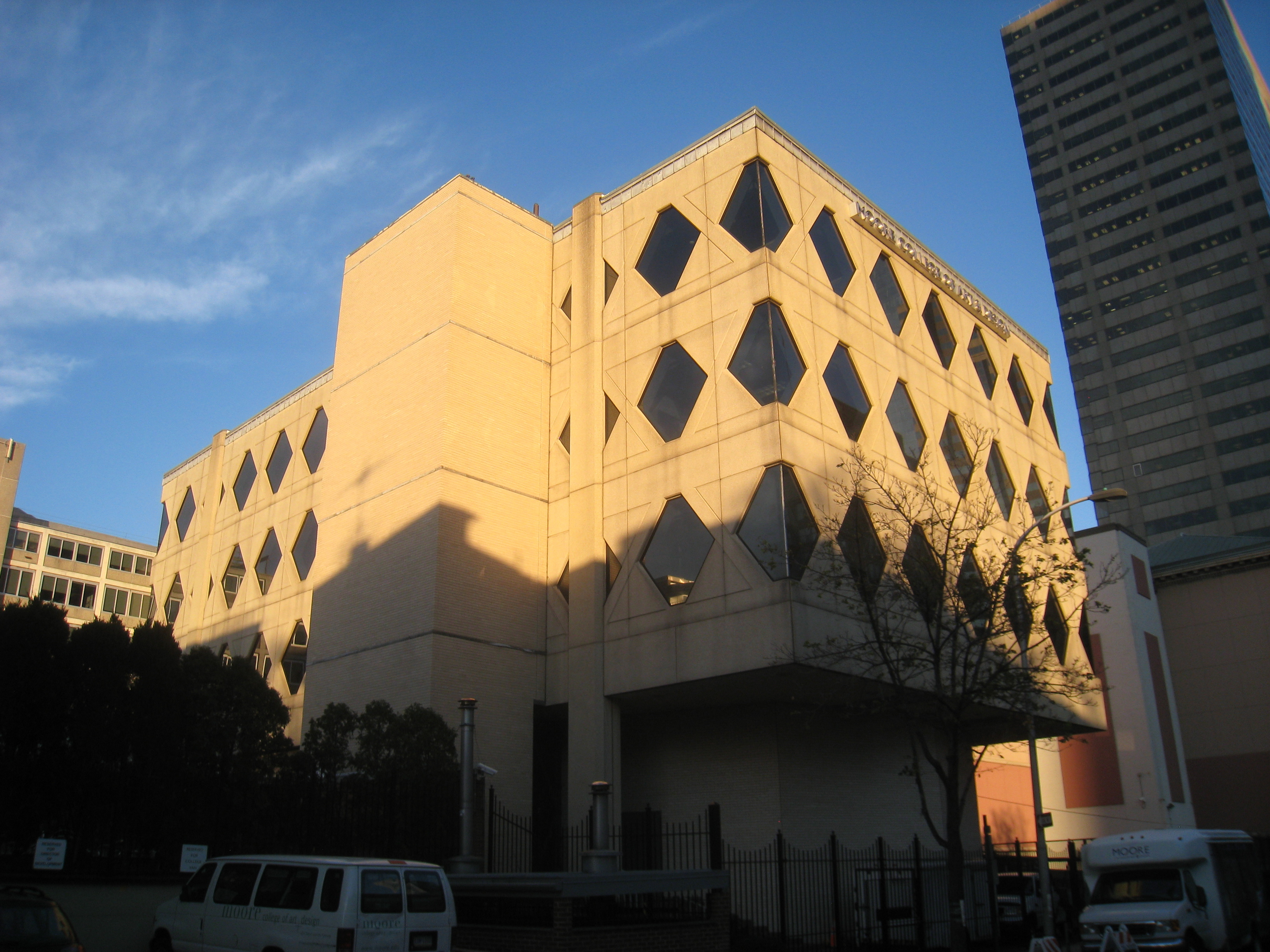
Penelope Wilson Hall contains studios and offices.

The institution was renamed in 1932 after Joseph Moore Jr. set up a $3 Million dollar endowment in memory of his parents. The institution became known as Moore Institute of Art, Science and Industry in 1932, as Moore College of Art in 1963, and as Moore College of Art and Design in 1988.

Moore now offers ten undergraduate programs including Art Education, Fashion Design, Fine Arts, Graphic Design, Illustration, Animation & Game Arts, Interior Design, Photography & Digital Arts, Film & Digital Cinema, and Entertainment Design each leading to a Bachelor of Fine Arts (BFA).

Moore has approximately 466 students enrolled in its undergraduate BFA program. Graduate, adult continuing education, and youth programs are open to all genders.

== The Galleries at Moore ==
The Galleries at Moore are open to the public and free of charge.

They hold an annual Fashion Show.

In 2023, they held an exhibition on the history of fashion and a High School Student Art Show.

Student work has been exhibited at the Governor's Residence. Students have designed costumes for the Philadelphia Ballet.

== Notable people ==
=== Alumnae ===
==== Contemporary ====
- Kate Bartoldus, sculptor, set designer (The Sixth Sense, 12 Monkeys, Unbreakable, Chasing Amy),
- Janet Biggs, video artist
- Mona Brody, printmaker
- Kathy Butterly, sculptor
- Karen Hartley-Nagle, former Congressional candidate
- Amy Ignatow, illustrator and author of The Popularity Papers series of children's books.
- Judith Joy Ross, Photographer, recipient of a Guggenheim Fellowship.
- Margie Palatini, author of children's literature
- Polly Smith, Emmy Award-winning costume designer, Jim Henson, The Muppets.
- Dom Streater, fashion designer, Winner of Project Runway (Season 12), and Project Runway All Stars (season 5)
- Sharon Wohlmuth, Pulitzer-prize winning photographer
- Pink (singer) Singer/Songwriter [dropped out]
- Adrienne Vittadini, fashion designer

==== As the Moore Institute of Art, Science and Industry (1932–1963) ====
- Beatrice Winn Berlin, painter, printmaker, and teacher
- Betty Bowes, painter, class of 1932, 1996 Distinguished Alumni
- Laura Marie Greenwood, painter

==== As the Philadelphia School of Design for Women (1848-1932) ====
- Eleanor Abrams, '08, Philadelphia Ten
- Theresa Bernstein, Philadelphia Ten
- Isabel Parke Branson, Philadelphia Ten
- Cora Smalley Brooks, Philadelphia Ten
- Constance Cochrane, Philadelphia Ten
- Mary-Russell Ferrell, '09, artist, author, educator, Philadelphia Ten
- Arrah Lee Gaul, graduate and faculty member (1922-1941), Philadelphia Ten
- Elizabeth Shippen Green, illustrator
- Bessie Pease Gutmann, children's book and magazine cover illustrator from the early 1900s
- Edith Lucile Howard, '08, Philadelphia Ten
- Anna Russell Jones, '25, textile and graphic designer and medical illustrator
- Helen Kiner McCarthy, '09, Philadelphia Ten
- Katharine Hood McCormick, Philadelphia Ten
- Alice Neel, '25, artist
- Anne Parrish, novelist and children's author
- Esther Alethea Richards, first woman to design US postage stamp
- Jessie Willcox Smith, illustrator

=== Others ===
==== Contemporary ====
- Barbara Blondeau, experimental photographer and faculty member
- Sheila Levrant de Bretteville, honorary degree recipient
- Moe Brooker, painter and faculty member (1995- )
- Lizbeth Stewart (1948–2013), American ceramist (BFA 1971)
- Lowery Stokes Sims, honorary degree recipient

==== As the Moore Institute of Art, Science and Industry (1932-1963) ====
- Beatrice Fenton, sculptor and faculty member (1942–1953)
- Simon Nicholson, artist and teacher from 1964 to 1966

==== As the Philadelphia School of Design for Women (1848-1932) ====
- Elliott Cresson, first president of the board of directors
- John Elliott Parker Daingerfield
- Daniel Garber, painter and faculty member (1907–1909)
- Robert Henri, painter and faculty member (1891–?)
- Samuel Murray, sculptor and faculty member (1890–1941)
- Henry B. Snell, artist and faculty member, 1899-1943

== See also ==
- Edwin Forrest House
- Women's College Coalition
