= Helen Kiner McCarthy =

- Born: 1884; Philadelphia, Pennsylvania
- Died: 1927 (aged 42–43)
- Known for: Painting

Helen Kiner McCarthy (1884–1927), was an American painter. She was an original member of the Philadelphia Ten.

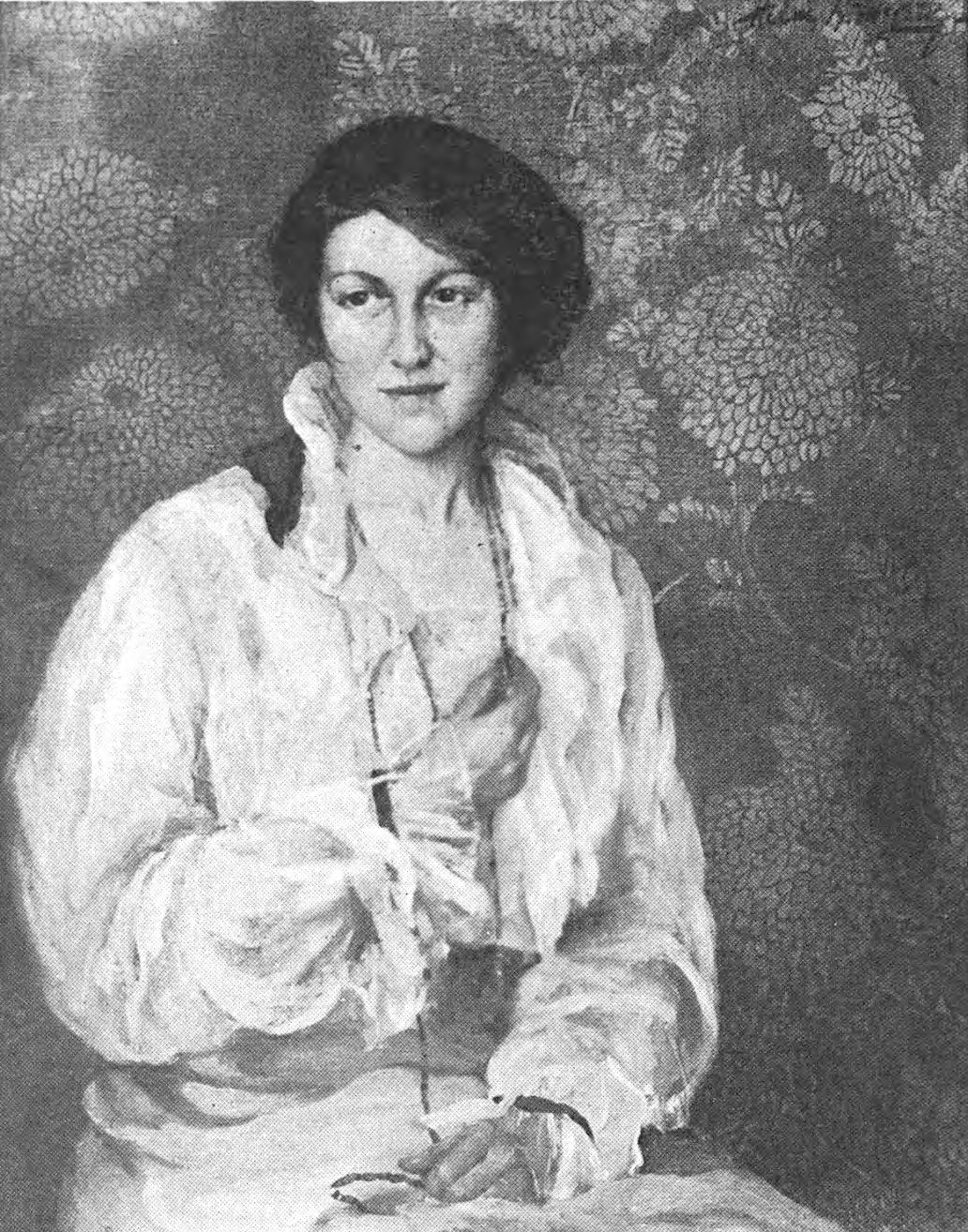
Portrait: Red and White, circa 1916

== Biography ==
McCarthy was born in 1884 in Poland, Ohio. In 1904, she began her studies at the Philadelphia School of Design, studying under Elliott Daingerfield, and Henry B. Snell. She graduated in 1909.

After graduation, she shared a Philadelphia studio with Mary-Russell Ferrell Colton for several years and then with Edith Lucile Howard.

From 1910 through 1926, McCarthy exhibited her work at the Pennsylvania Academy of Fine Art, the Art Institute of Chicago, the Plastic Club, and the National Association of Women Artists. In 1917, she participated in the first exhibition of the Philadelphia Ten at the Art Club of Philadelphia.

McCarthy was a member of several art groups that focused on promoting women's art; the Plastic Club, and the National Association of Women Artists and its predecessor the National Association of Women Painters and Sculptors. She was also a member of the International Society of Arts and Letters and the New York Society of Painters.

McCarthy died in 1927.

== Legacy ==
In 1930, National Academy of Design began awarding "Helen K. McCArthy Memorial Prize" for best landscape by a woman artist, forty years old or younger. The first award went to Janet Reid Kellogg.
