= Constance Cochrane =

American painter

- Born: April 28, 1888; Pensacola, Florida, U.S.
- Died: December 13, 1962 (aged 74); Delaware County, Pennsylvania, U.S.
- Occupations: Artist, art educator
- Father: Henry Clay Cochrane
- Relatives: Edward L. Cochrane (brother); Edward P. Lull (grandfather); Richard Swann Lull (uncle)

Constance Cochrane (April 28, 1888 – December 13, 1962) was an American painter, known for her seascapes. She was an original member of the Philadelphia Ten. She taught at the Philadelphia School of Design for Women in the 1920s, and had a summer studio in Monhegan, Maine.

== Early life and education ==
Cochrane was born in 1888 at the United States Navy Yard in Pensacola, Florida, the daughter of Henry Clay Cochrane and Elizabeth Lull Cochrane. Her father was a general in the United States Marine Corps; her brother Edward L. Cochrane was an admiral in the United States Navy. Her maternal grandfather, Edward P. Lull, was also a Naval officer. Paleontologist Richard Swann Lull was her maternal uncle. She attended the Philadelphia School of Design, studying under Elliott Daingerfield and Henry B. Snell. After completing her studies she set up a studio in Philadelphia.

== Career ==
During World War I, Cochrane was a member of the Camouflage Corps of the National League for Women's Service, painting camouflage for the United States Navy in Washington. Between 1921 and 1927 she lectured at the Philadelphia School of Design for Women. She was an original member of the Philadelphia Ten. She was also a member of the Philadelphia Art Alliance and the National Association of Women Artists. She had a joint exhibition with Arrah Lee Gaul and Wuanita Smith in Philadelphia in 1931.

Coming from a naval family, Cochrane was known for her seascapes. In 1921 she began visiting Monhegan, Maine, eventually building a summer studio there, where her mother also worked, building and carving custom picture frames for Cochrane's paintings. She was a member of the Daughters of the American Revolution.

Cochrane died in 1962, at the age of 74, in Delaware County, Pennsylvania. "Glory of Fall", a landscape by Cochrane, was included in a 2025 exhibit at Bowdoin College.
