= Spruance =

Spruance may refer to:

- Spruance (surname)
- Spruance-class destroyer, the primary destroyer built for the U.S. Navy during the 1970s
- USS Spruance, the name of two United States Navy ships named after Admiral Raymond A. Spruance
