= Cresson Traveling Scholarship =

- Description: Scholarship for foreign travel and study for PAFA students
- Country: United States
- Presented by: Pennsylvania Academy of the Fine Arts (PAFA)

The Cresson Traveling Scholarship, also known as the William Emlen Cresson Memorial Traveling Scholarship, is a two-year scholarship for foreign travel and/or study awarded annually to art students at the Pennsylvania Academy of the Fine Arts in Philadelphia, Pennsylvania.

== History and notable laureates ==
Awarded for excellence, the prize was funded by Emlen and Priscilla Cresson in memory of their son William Emlen Cresson, an Academy alumnus who died in 1868 at the age of 23. He had been a child prodigy painter who began exhibiting at the Academy at the age of 11.

The first Cresson Traveling Scholarships were awarded in 1902. Initially, they were $1,000 one-year scholarships, renewable for a second year, and sometimes beyond. Multiple awards were given in painting, along with one in sculpture and one in architecture. Awards in illustration were added later.

Cresson European Scholarships of $5000 for summer travel, were also awarded annually. These were not as prestigious as the two-year scholarships, with which they are often confused.

Laura Wheeler Waring, the first African-American woman to win a Cresson Traveling Scholarship, was studying in Paris in 1914 when World War I broke out. Subsequent winners were allowed to postpone their travel until the conflict was over.

== Scholarship winners ==
- Henry R. Rittenberg (painting), 1902
- Louis Betts (painting), 1903, 1904
- Martha Walter (painting), 1903, 1904
- Emilie Zeckwer (painting), 1903, 1904
- Giuseppe Donato (sculpture), 1903, 1904
- Gilbert L. Hindermyer (architecture), 1903, 1904
- Alice V. Corson (painting), 1904, 1905
- E. H. Allerton (painting), 1903, 1904
- Ella Sophonisba Hergesheimer (painting), 1904, 1905
- Morris Molarsky (painting), 1904, 1905
- Charles Frederick Ramsey (painting), 1904, 1905
- F. Hutton Shill (painting), 1904, 1905
- Albert Laessle (sculpture), 1904, 1905
- Phineas Paist (architecture), 1904, 1905
- Arthur B. Carles (painting), 1905, 1906, 1907
- Daniel Garber (painting), 1905, 1906
- Victor H. Zoll (sculpture), 1905, 1906
- William E. Groban (architecture), 1905, 1906
- Clarence K. Hinkle (painting), 1906, 1907
- John M. Bateman (sculpture), 1906, 1907
- Warden H. Fenton (architecture), 1906, 1907
- Lawrence Saint (painting), 1907
- Thomas Harlan Ellett (architecture), 1907
- C. Edgar Cope (architecture), 1907
- Nina B. Ward (painting), 1908, 1909, 1911
- Robert Rodes McGoodwin (architecture), 1908
- Cornelia Barns (painting), 1909, 1910
- Beatrice Fenton (sculpture), 1909, 1910
- Leopold Seyffert, 1910, 1911, 1912
- Donald Blake
- Craig Johns, 1911
- Katherine Southwick, 1911, 1912
- Gertrude A. Lambert, 1912, 1913
- Elsa Jemne, 1914, 1915
- Laura Wheeler Waring (painting), 1914, 1915
- Edith McMurtrie
- Charles Skinner Garner, 1916, 1917
- Roy Cleveland Nuse, 1917, 1918
- Clarence Johnson (painting), 1917. Travel deferred until 1920 because of his service in World War I.
- Sue May Westcott Gill
- Walter W. Josephs (painting), 1918
- Delphine Bradt (painting), 1918
- Raphael Sabatini (sculpture), 1918
- Otto Gatter (illustration), 1918
- Elmer G. Anderson (painting), 1919
- Sara Carles (painting), 1919
- Wayne K. Crumling (painting), 1919
- Edith W. Dallas (painting), 1919
- Elise Fullerton (painting), 1919
- Catharine Harley Grant (painting), 1919
- Helene Holdt (painting), 1919
- Julian Levi (painting), 1919
- Mabel Pugh (painting), 1919
- Tokio Ueyama (painting), 1919
- Bernard Gordon (sculpture), 1919
- Jean Knox (illustration), 1919
- Abraham Rattner (illustration), 1919
- Alfred R. Mitchell, 1920
- Morris Blackburn,
- Gladys Edgerly Bates, 1921
- Arthur Meltzer, 1921
- Barse Miller (painting), 1922, 1923
- Walker Hancock (sculpture), 1922, 1923
- Margaret Brisbine, 1923
- Walter Inglis Anderson, 1927
- Lucius Kutchin, 1927
- William H. Ferguson, 1927
- Marina Timoshenko, 1927
- Henry Cooper, 1927
- Fred Flanigan, 1927
- Margaret Ralston Gest, 1927
- Vincent McCoy Reader, 1927
- Dorothy L. Van Loan, 1927
- Edith Wood, 1927
- Benton Murdoch Spruance, 1928
- Joseph Plavcan, 1928
- Robert Cronbach, 1929, 1930
- Charles W. Ward, 1930
- Dacre F. Boulton, 1931, 1932
- Alvyn Boyd Cruise
- Charles M. West, Jr., 1934
- Roswell Weidner, 1935
- Jack Delano, 1936
- Geraldine Funk (Alvarez)
- Dorothy Gilman Butters, 1944
- Raymond Saunders, 1956
- Phoebe Chu, 1958
- Charles Searles
- Elizabeth Osborne
- Barkley L. Hendricks, 1966
- Robert Bender, 1973
- Jill A. Rupinski, 1976
- Bo Bartlett, 1980
- James P. Repenning, 1980
- Douglas Martenson, 1981
- Vincent Desiderio, 1982
- Peter Groesbeck
- Andrea Packard
- Orit Hofshi, 1989
