= Cora Smalley Brooks =

American painter

- Born: 1885
- Died: 1930 (aged 44–45)
- Known for: Painting

Cora Smalley Brooks (1885–1930), was an American painter. She was an original member of the Philadelphia Ten.

== Biography ==
Brooks was born in 1885. She attended the Philadelphia School of Design, studying under Elliott Daingerfield, and Henry B. Snell. After completing her studies Brooks set up a studio in Philadelphia. At various times she shared this studio space with fellow Philadelphia Ten artists Eleanor Abrams, Edith Lucile Howard, and Constance Cochrane.

Brooks specialized in floral still lifes. She was a member of the Plastic Club, the Delaware County Art Association, the Philadelphia Ten, and the National Association of Women Artists.

In 1929 Brooks had a one-woman show at the Arts Club of Washington, DC. She died of pneumonia the following year.

== Gallery ==
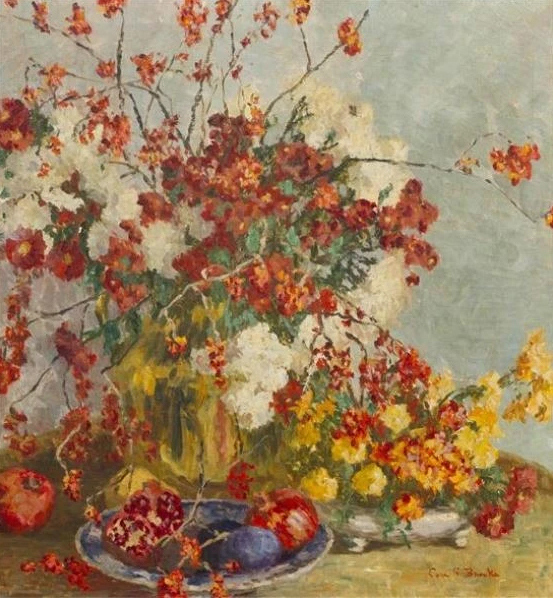
Still Life with Pink Flowers

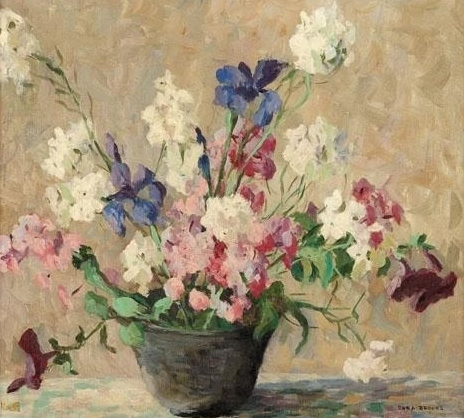
Bowl of Posies
