= Marian T. MacIntosh =

Irish-American painter

- Born: 1871; Ireland
- Died: October 2, 1936 (aged 64–65); New England
- Occupation: Artist
- Father: John S. MacIntosh
- Honours: Gold medal, The Plastic Club; Landscape prize, National Association of Women Painters and Sculptors

Marian T. MacIntosh (1871–October 2, 1936) was an Irish-American painter who lived in Princeton, New Jersey and Philadelphia.

== Biography ==
MacIntosh was born in Ireland, the daughter of the Reverend John S. MacIntosh. She demonstrated a passion for art from a young age. She graduated from Bryn Mawr College in 1890 and took up a career in teaching, for a time, before giving it up to pursue studies in art with Heinrich Knirr in Germany and with Henry B. Snell in the U.S.

During World War I, MacIntosh was field secretary for the Pennsylvania branch of the Woman's Land Army of America. In that role, she traveled around the state engaging women in agriculture to boost wartime food production.

=== Artwork ===
In 1919, her painting Evening in the Harbor was accepted by Art Institute of Chicago for its annual exhibition; this became her first official recognition as an artist. After that, her work appeared in exhibitions in New York, Cincinnati and Philadelphia. In 1922, she won the Philadelphia Plastic Club's gold medal for "artwork in any medium."

In 1927, her painting Tinker's Hollow won the Landscape Prize from the National Association of Women Painters and Sculptors. MacIntosh was also invited to present a solo exhibition at the Washington Arts Club.

She was active in the Philadelphia community as well, serving as a division head of the Civic Club, an organization to improve the city's public schools and build political power for women.

MacIntosh died unexpectedly October 2, 1936 while visiting New England where she had been spending the summer months.

=== Posthumous exhibit ===
MacIntosh's work was included in a show about "The Philadelphia Ten," a group of female artists who exhibited their work together from 1917 to 1945. It was held in 1998 at the Westmoreland Museum of American Art in Greensburg, western Pennsylvania.
