= Philadelphia Ten =

American female artists group (1917 to 1945)

The Philadelphia Ten
- Members of the Philadelphia Ten at their Art Club of Philadelphia exhibition, January 28 – February 11, 1928.
- Formation: 1917
- Dissolved: 1945; 81 years ago
- Purpose: arts organization for women to promote members' works
- Headquarters: Philadelphia, Pennsylvania

The Philadelphia Ten, also known as The Ten, was a group of American female artists who exhibited together from 1917 to 1945. The group, eventually numbering 30 painters and sculptors, exhibited annually in Philadelphia and later had traveling exhibitions at museums throughout the East Coast and the Midwest.

== Purpose ==
The Philadelphia Ten was formed to help women who wanted to move beyond the role of hobbyists, as they were commonly viewed in the early 20th century, to be accepted as professional artists. For example, one of the objectives of the group was to give women the ability to control how their work was exhibited. They could limit the number of participants in shows and allow each one to exhibit a larger number of pieces than was typically possible in a juried competition.

In addition, the group provided a supportive environment for their creativity, with discussion forums, access to models and professional instruction. The lifestyle choices of the members were unusual for the time: many of them never married; others who did marry chose not to have children or kept their maiden names. For many of the women, the group became a source of friendships and collegial relationships.

== History and legacy ==
The group's first show was held at the Art Club of Philadelphia in February 1917. It included 247 paintings by 11 artists, nine trained at the Philadelphia School of Design for Women (now Moore College of Art and Design) and two from the Pennsylvania Academy of the Fine Arts. Over the years, more women joined the group; in all, 30 artists participated in the 65 subsequent exhibitions. The final exhibition of the group was held in April 1945 at the Woodmere Gallery in Philadelphia.

The works exhibited reflected the influence of teachers such as impressionist Henry B. Snell and included landscapes, still lifes, portraits and sculpture.

In 1998, in celebration of the school's 150th anniversary, the faculty of the Moore College of Art and Design organized a retrospective of the Philadelphia Ten that traveled to museums throughout the country. The exhibition included 81 paintings and 9 sculptures.

In 2010, Moore College showed archived pieces dating from the 1920s–40s of seven of the first eleven members of The Philadelphia Ten, along with recent works by members of The Other Woman art collective, also formed by former students of the college.

During the late 19th and early 20th centuries, many local and regional women's art organizations were formed and sponsored exhibitions. The Ladies' Art Association of New York was among the first, followed by The Plastic Club in Philadelphia, the National Association of Women Painters and Sculptors in New York, and others. However, the Philadelphia Ten is recognized as being the group that exhibited most widely and for the longest time.

== Members ==
All of the members of the Philadelphia Ten attended art school in Philadelphia. After the original exhibition by 11 painters, the group eventually grew to include 23 painters and 7 sculptors. The artists were generally not on the cutting edge of modernism, and they are not well-represented in museum collections. However, their work was well-received during the 1920s and 1930s, when painters like Pablo Picasso and Henri Matisse were not yet popular in the United States.

=== Original group ===
All of the original members were painters.

- Eleanor Abrams
- Katharine Marie Barker
- Theresa Bernstein
- Cora S. Brooks
- Isabel Branson Cartwright
- Constance Cochrane
- Mary-Russell Ferrell Colton
- Arrah Lee Gaul
- Lucile Howard
- Helen Kiner McCarthy
- Katharine Hood McCormick

Cartwright, Cochrane and Howard participated in all 65 exhibitions held by the group.

=== Other painters ===
- Maude Drein Bryant
- Fern Coppedge
- Nancy Maybin Ferguson
- Margaret Ralston Gest
- Sue May Gill
- Susette Schultz Keast
- Marian T. MacIntosh
- Emma Fordyce MacRae
- Mary Elizabeth Price
- Elizabeth Wentworth Roberts
- Susan Gertrude Schell
- Edith Longstreth Wood

=== Sculptors ===
- Gladys Edgerly Bates
- Cornelia Van Auken Chapin
- Beatrice Fenton
- Harriet Whitney Frishmuth
- Genevieve Karr Hamlin
- Joan Hartley
- Mary Louise Lawser

== Gallery ==
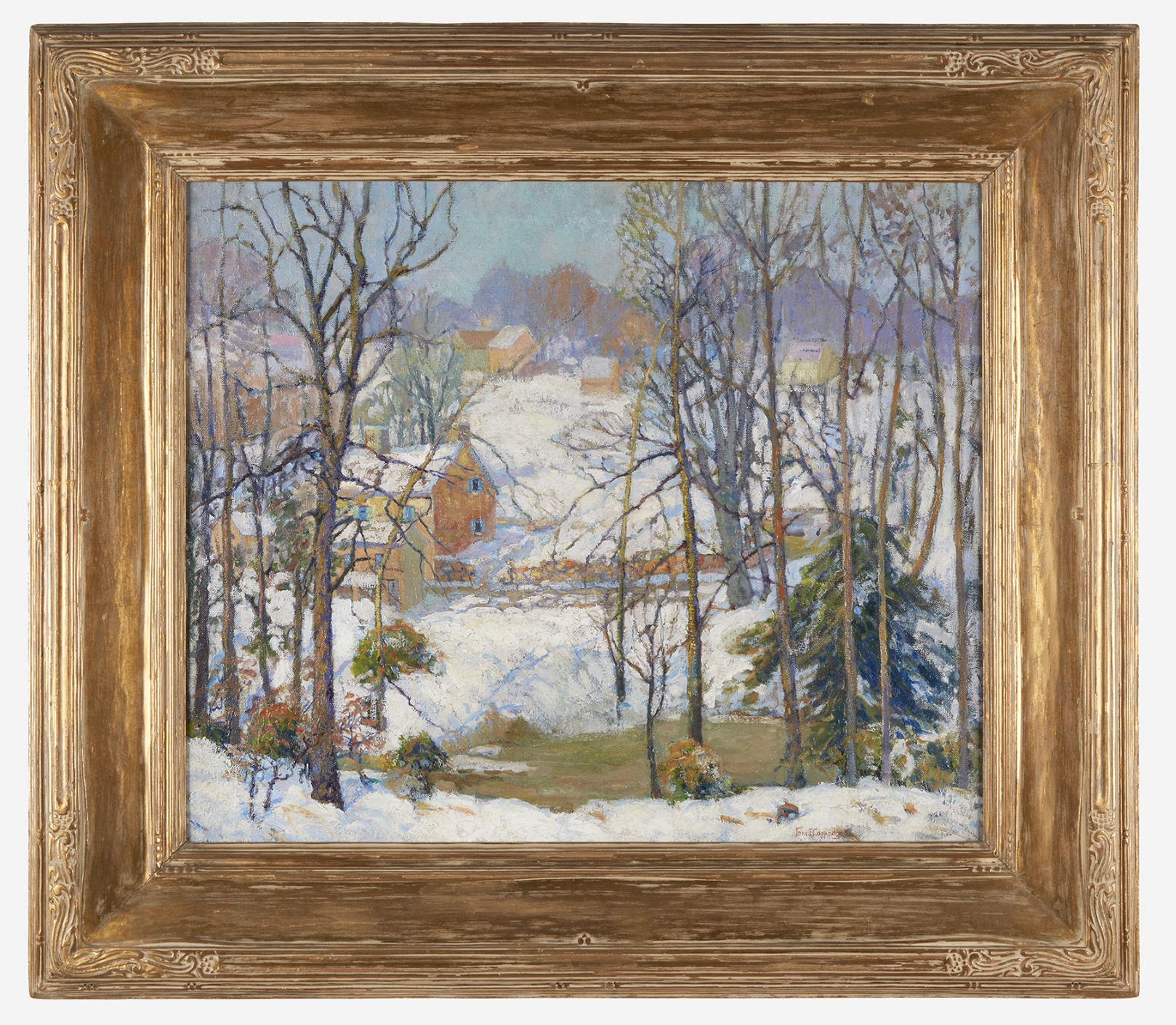
Fern Coppedge, "Village in Winter"

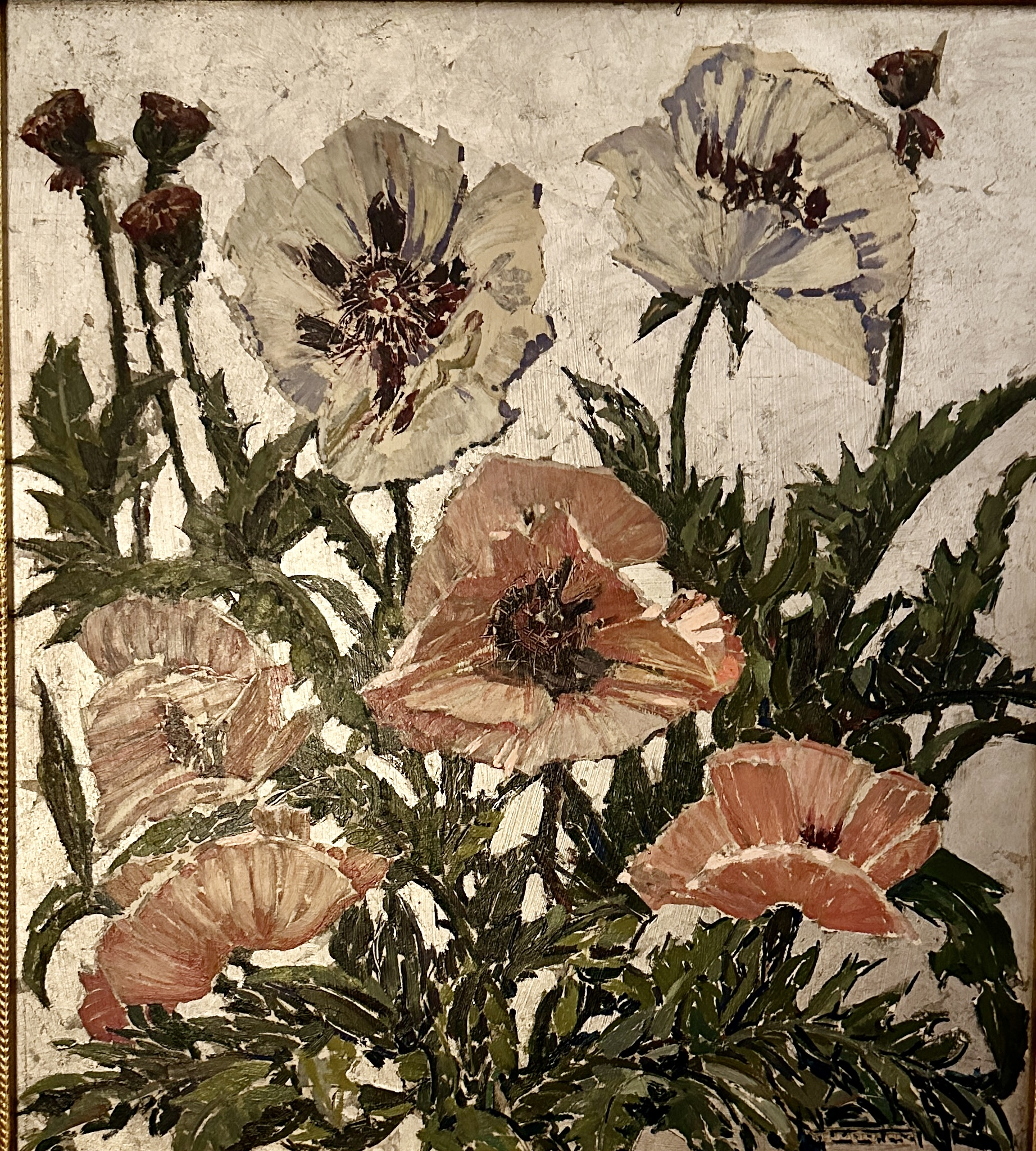
M. Elizabeth Price, "Poppies", 1932

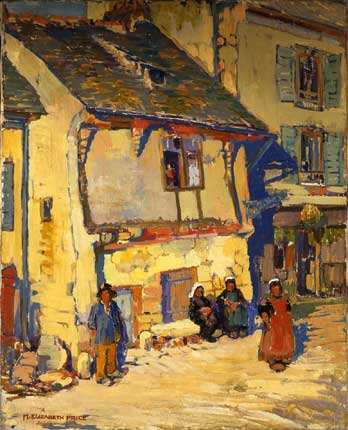
M. Elizabeth Price, The Wine Shop, Quimperle, Brittany, by 1921

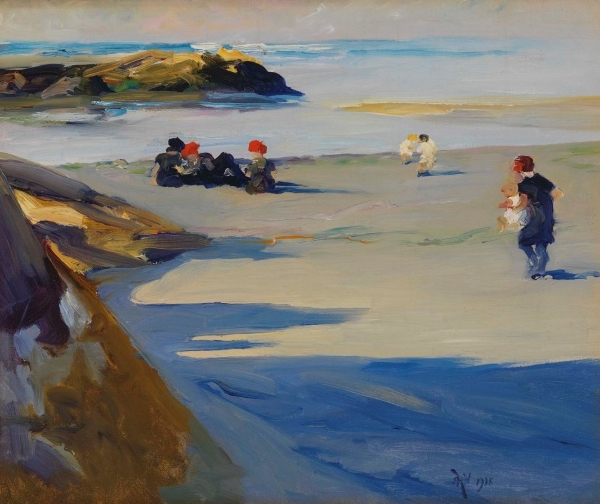
Elizabeth Wentworth Roberts, Figures on the Sand, Annisquam, 1915

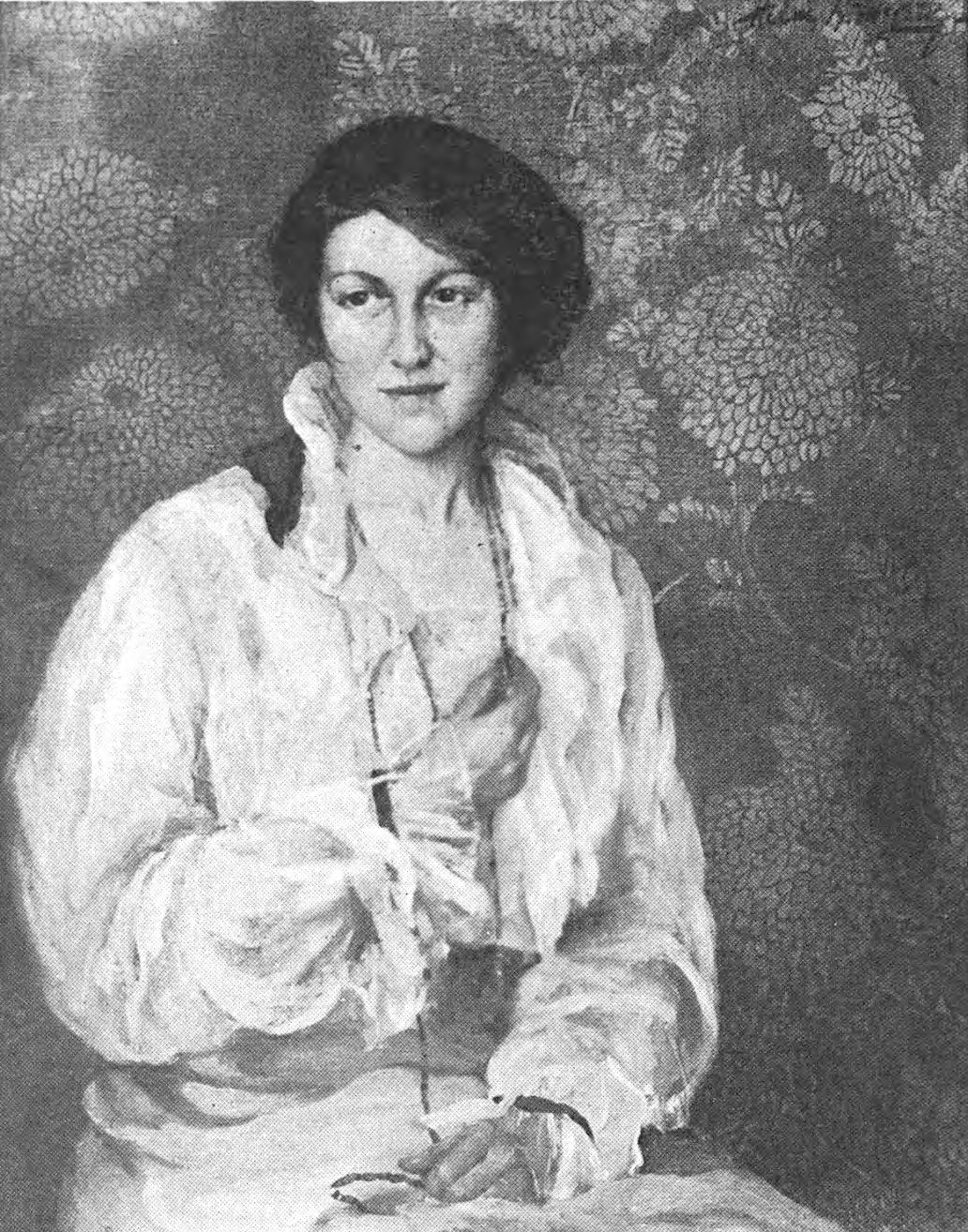
Helen Kiner McCarthy, Portrait: Red and White, by 1916

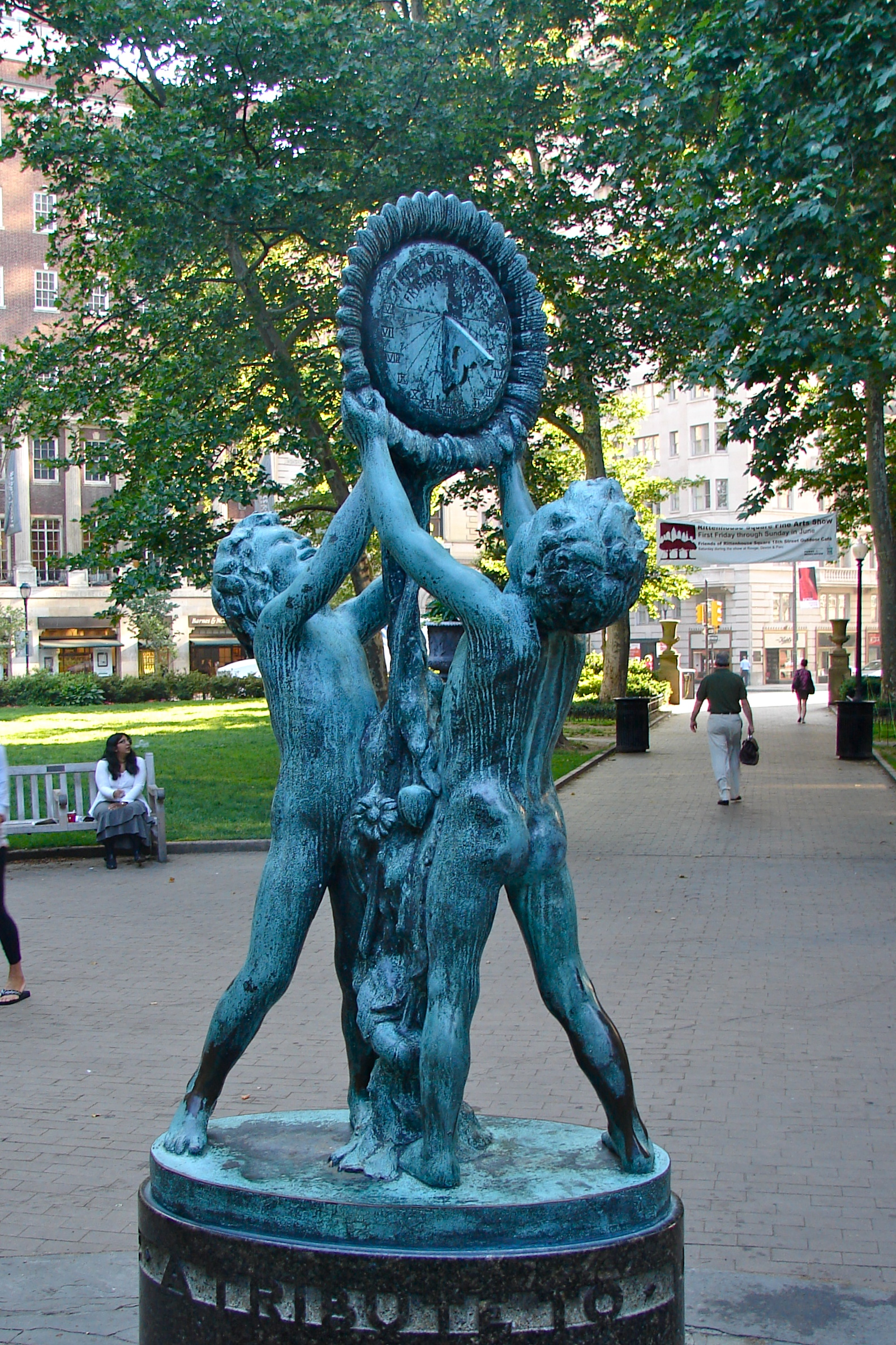
Beatrice Fenton, Sunflower Dial

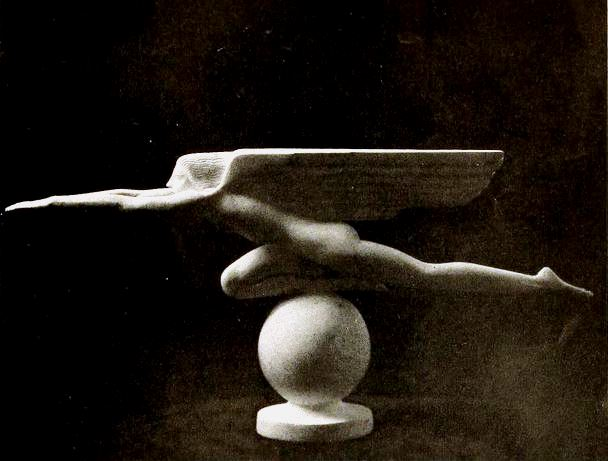
Harriet Frishmuth, Speed, 1922

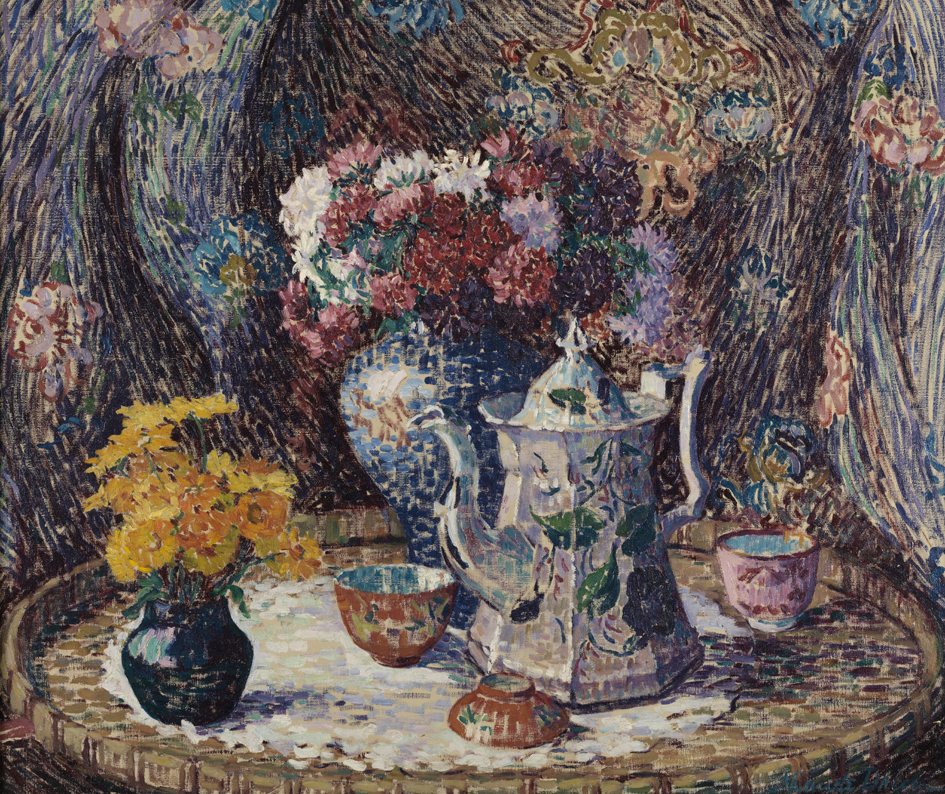
Maude Drein Bryant, Calendulas and Asters

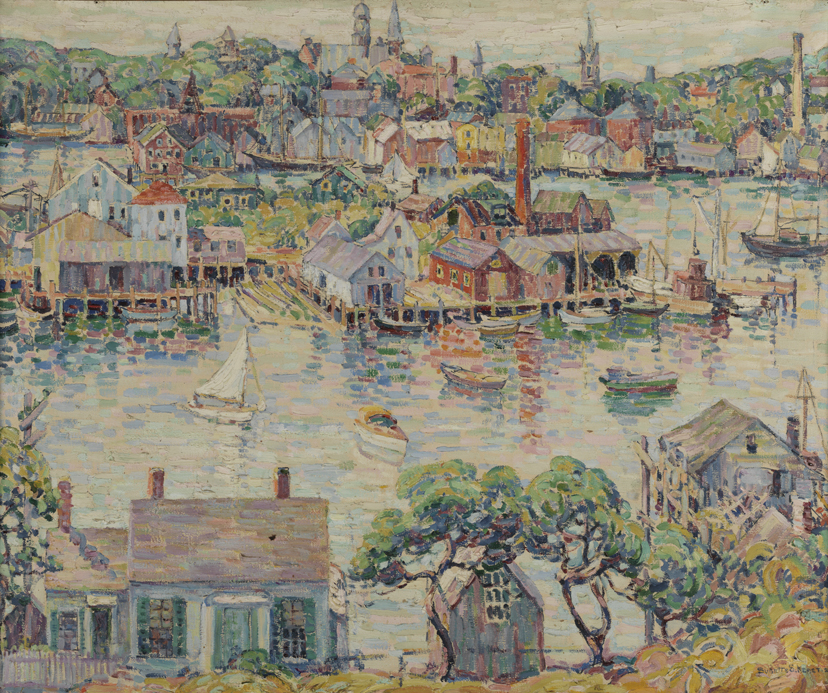
Susette Schultz Keast, Inner Harbor
