= Spruance (surname) =

Spruance is a surname. Notable people with the surname include:

- Raymond A. Spruance, U.S. Navy Admiral during World War II
- Trey Spruance, American composer, producer, and musician
- Presley Spruance, American merchant and politician
- Benton Murdoch Spruance, American painter, printmaker, architect
