= Laura Marie Greenwood =

American painter (1897 - 1951)

- Born: 1897; Philadelphia, Pennsylvania, United States
- Died: 1951 (aged 53–54)
- Education: Temple University, La France Art Institute, Moore Institute of Art, Barnes Foundation
- Movement: Impressionism

Laura Marie Greenwood (1897–1951) was an American painter of portraits and still lifes. She worked with oils, watercolors and pastels. Greenwood also lectured on art history and taught fine art.

== Biography ==
Greenwood was born in 1897 in Philadelphia, Pennsylvania. She studied at Temple University, La France Art Institute, and graduated in 1933 from the Moore College of Art and Design (then the Moore Institute). Her studies continued at the Barnes Foundation and with Earle Horter.

She was active in Philadelphia and exhibited her work in the city at the Pennsylvania Academy of the Fine Arts and in New York and Washington, D.C. Greenwood painted portraits, especially of young women, floral still lifes, and landscapes. She painted with oils on canvas and over her career her brush strokes became more free and expressive. She also worked in watercolor, and was elected a member of the Philadelphia Watercolour Club and was also a member of The Plastic Club. Greenwood was proficient in pastels. She made Impressionist and Regionalist works, but was a particularly adventurous Modernist.

Greenwood taught fine art and was a lecturer on American art history.

Greenwood died in Philadelphia on July 25, 1951, at the age of 54. She was buried in the Cedar Hill Cemetery on July 30. There was an exhibition of her work held in 1987 at the Lagakos-Turak Gallery entitled "Laura M. Greenwood: American Paintings of the 1930s and 40s."

Greenwood possessed old-fashioned painterly virtues and was not particularly interested in new approaches, although there are echoes of one of her teachers, modernist Earle Horter, in some of her work. Relaxed, loosely brushed and relying on a bright palette, her especially hearty and amiable tabletop still lifes and her infrequent but interesting landscapes represent a solid and very respectable achievement. Her portrait and figure subjects have a decorative, early-20th century charm, but threaded through this show are some paintings best described as competent but uninspired.

— Victoria Donohoe, Inquirer Art Critic
