= Lizbeth Stewart =

American ceramist (1948–2013)

- Lizbeth Stewart in Philadelphia
- Born: December 22, 1948; Philadelphia, Pennsylvania
- Died: June 24, 2013 (aged 64); Yardley, Pennsylvania
- Known for: Ceramics

Monkey with Roses by Lizbeth Stewart, 1999, Honolulu Museum of Art

Lizbeth Stewart (December 22, 1948 – June 24, 2013), who is also known as Lizbeth McNett Stewart, was an American ceramist who was born in Philadelphia and grew up in Southampton, Pennsylvania. She was awarded a bachelor's degree in fine arts from Moore College of Art and Design in 1971. In 1990, she married Matthew C. Gruskin. For 30 years, she taught ceramics at the University of the Arts (Philadelphia), before retiring as a professor emeritus in December, 2012. She died June 24, 2013, of lung cancer at her home in Yardley, Pennsylvania.

Stewart is best known for her hand-built ceramic portrayals of animals. Typically, the modeling is realistic, but the painting is stylized. Monkey with Roses, in the collection of the Honolulu Museum of Art, is typical of her larger works and demonstrates this dichotomy, as well as her use of separate ceramic flowers to create an environment. The Hermitage Museum (St. Petersburg, Russia), the Honolulu Museum of Art, the Smithsonian American Art Museum (Washington, D.C.), and the Winterthur Museum (Winterthur, Delaware) are among the public collections holding work by Lizbeth Stewart.
