= USS Spruance =

Two ships of the United States Navy have been named USS Spruance, in honor of Admiral Raymond A. Spruance (1886–1969):

- USS Spruance (DD-963) was the lead ship of Spruance-class destroyers, launched in 1973 and struck in 2005
- USS Spruance (DDG-111) is an Arleigh Burke-class destroyer, launched in 2010 and commissioned in 2011

== See also ==
- Spruance (disambiguation)
