= Eleanor Abrams =

American painter

- Born: 1885; Karns City, Pennsylvania
- Died: 1967 (aged 81–82)
- Known for: Painting

Eleanor Abrams (1885 - 1967) was an American painter. She was an original member of the Philadelphia Ten.

== Biography ==
Abrams was born in 1885 in Butler County, Pennsylvania. She worked as an occupational therapist, known as Reconstruction Aides, during WWI.

Abrams moved to Philadelphia at the age of twenty where she shared a studio with Edith Lucile Howard and Cora S. Brooks. She spent time in New York where she shared a studio with Mary Elizabeth Price.

She attended the Philadelphia School of Design for Women, studying under Henry B. Snell and Elliott Daingerfield. She graduated in 1908.

From a wealthy family, she was able to spend the winter months in Bermuda and draw inspiration from the gardens there. Abrams specialized in painting flowers, exhibiting at The Plastic Club, the Associated Artists of Pittsburgh, and the Philadelphia Ten

Abrams died in 1967.
