= Susan Gertrude Schell =

American painter

- Born: 1891; Titusville, Pennsylvania
- Died: 1970 (aged 78–79)
- Known for: Painting, Educator

Susan Gertrude Schell (1891-1970), was an American painter and educator. She was a member of the Philadelphia Ten.

== Biography ==
Schell was born in 1891 in Titusville, Pennsylvania. She spent her youth in Philadelphia where she first met fellow artist Nancy Maybin Ferguson.

She attended the West Chester State Teachers College, the Pennsylvania Museum and School of Industrial Art, and the Pennsylvania Academy of the Fine Arts.

Schell taught at the Pennsylvania Museum and School of Industrial Art from 1930 through 1960.

Schell was associated with the Philadelphia Ten from 1934 to 1945.

In 1953 the Woodmere Art Museum purchased Pennsylvania Pattern for their collection. The Woodmere Art Museum also held a retrospective exhibition of Schell's work in 1962, as well as a memorial exhibition of her work in 1972.

Schell died in 1970.

Pennsylvania Pattern by Susan Gertrude Schell c. 1936
