= Joan Hartley (sculptor) =

American sculptor

Joan Hartley (1892–1984) was an American sculptor. She was a member of the Philadelphia Ten, a group of American female artists who exhibited together from 1917 to 1945. The group, eventually numbering 30 painters and sculptors, exhibited annually in Philadelphia and later had traveling exhibitions at museums throughout the East Coast and the Midwest.

Hartley attended the Pennsylvania Academy of Fine Arts.

She often served a chairwomen and committee members for exhibitions of the National Association of Women Artists.

Hartley's sculptures are on display at Brookgreen Gardens in South Carolina.

== Works ==
Furies - A pair of sculptures, one male, one female,1933: Brookgreen Gardens
