= Arrah Lee Gaul =

American painter (1888–1980)

- Born: 1888; Philadelphia, Pennsylvania, U.S.
- Died: December 11, 1980; Philadelphia, Pennsylvania, U.S.
- Resting place: West Laurel Hill Cemetery, Bala Cynwyd, Pennsylvania, U.S.
- Known for: Painting

Arrah Lee Gaul (1888 – December 11, 1980) was an American painter. She was the first woman to have a solo exhibition at the Philadelphia Art Club. Gaul was the official artist of the Philadelphia Sesqui-Centennial and an original member of the Philadelphia Ten and a member of The Plastic Club.

== Early life and education ==
Gaul was born in 1888 in Philadelphia, Pennsylvania. Her father was Revered C. Lee Gaul.

She graduated from Philadelphia High School for Girls and the Philadelphia School of Design for Women where she studied under Elliott Daingerfield, and Henry B. Snell.

== Career ==
Gaul pursued additional studies at the University of Pennsylvania before returning in 1921 to teach at the Moore College of Art and Design. She eventually became the head of the art department there.

In 1917, she participated in the inaugural exhibition of the Philadelphia Ten. She also exhibited nationally at the Art Institute of Chicago, the Pennsylvania Academy of the Fine Arts, and the National Academy of Design in New York. She was the first woman to have a solo exhibition at the Philadelphia Art Club. Internationally, she exhibited at Beaux Arts Gallery in London, the Paris Salon of 1931, and the Grand Palais des Champs Elysees.

Gaul frequently traveled to foreign locations to paint, including Greece, Italy, Algiers, China, Hong Kong, Thailand, and India. During one of her early trips to Paris, she studied with Charles-François-Prosper Guérin.

She was an original member of the Philadelphia Ten and a member of the Sketch Class Committee of the Plastic Club.

She died on December 11, 1980, in Philadelphia, and was interred at West Laurel Hill Cemetery in Bala Cynwyd, Pennsylvania.

== Legacy ==
After her death, she left 200 of her paintings to Illinois Wesleyan University. She had only visited the campus once, but her father had received an honorary doctorate degree in theology from the school.
