= Betty Bowes =

American painter (1911–2007)

Betty Bowes (July 30, 1911 – September 12, 2007) was an American painter.

Bowes, known for her semi-abstract work in acrylic, was born in Philadelphia, and studied at the Moore College of Art and the University of Pennsylvania. She received a George W. Elkins European Fellowship. During her career she exhibited widely, both in solo and in group exhibitions. She was a member of the American Watercolor Society, the National Academy of Design, the National Society of Painters in Casein and Acrylic, the Audubon Artists, and the Knickerbocker Artists. She won many awards and honors, including seventeen medals of honor from the American Watercolor Society; her work is in the collections of the Philadelphia Museum of Art, the Pennsylvania Academy of the Fine Arts, the National Academy of Design, and the University of Southern California, among other organizations. She married Thomas David Bowes in 1946; the couple divorced in 1981. At her death she left a bequest to the Francisvale Home for Smaller Animals in Radnor, Pennsylvania, and as a result a dog park in the town was named in her honor in 2016.
