= Gladys Edgerly Bates =

American sculptor (1896–2003)

- Bates standing next to her sculpture The Acrobat, in 1934
- Born: Gladys Cecelia Edgerly; July 15, 1896; Hopewell, New Jersey
- Died: July 28, 2003 (aged 107); Mystic, Connecticut
- Known for: Sculpture
- Spouse: Kenneth Bates (m. 1923)

Gladys Edgerly Bates (July 15, 1896 – July 28, 2003) was an American sculptor known for her figure carving. Her work is in permanent collections at the Metropolitan Museum of Art and the Pennsylvania Academy of the Fine Arts. She was a member of the Philadelphia Ten. She was a founding member of the Mystic Museum of Art.

== Biography ==
Bates was born Gladys Cecelia Edgerly on July 15, 1896, in Hopewell, New Jersey. From 1910 to 1916 she attended the Corcoran School of Art in Washington, D.C. In 1916 she began attending the Pennsylvania Academy of Fine Art (PAFA) where she studied with Daniel Garber and Charles Grafly.

In 1921, she was awarded the Cresson Traveling Scholarship by the PAFA which allowed her to travel to Europe.

In 1923, she married Kenneth Bates, with whom she had three children.

In 1924, the couple settled in Mystic, Connecticut. There they were among the artists who worked with Charles Harold Davis to establish the Mystic Museum of Art.

Bates was a member of the Philadelphia Ten, the Mystic Art Association, the National Association of Women Artists and the National Sculpture Society.

Bates died in Mystic, Connecticut on July 28, 2003.
