= Benton Murdoch Spruance =

American painter

- Born: Benton Murdoch Spruance; June 25, 1904; Philadelphia, Pennsylvania, U.S.
- Died: December 6, 1967 (aged 63); Germantown, Philadelphia, U.S.
- Education: University of Pennsylvania; Pennsylvania Academy of the Fine Arts
- Known for: Painting, printmaking, architecture
- Awards: Cresson Traveling Scholarship, Philadelphia Art Alliance Medal of Achievement

Benton Murdoch Spruance (June 25, 1904 – December 6, 1967) was an American painter, printmaker and architect. A long-term faculty member and chair of the Arts Department at Beaver College in Glenside, Pennsylvania, he subsequently chaired the Printmaking Department of the Philadelphia College of Art.

He became known as "the dean of Philadelphia lithographers", according to The Philadelphia Inquirer.

== Biography ==
Born in Philadelphia, Pennsylvania on June 25, 1904, Spruance was employed as a clerk in an architect's office while pursuing architectural studies at the University of Pennsylvania.

During this time, he also taught himself to do graphic sketching. He was subsequently awarded a scholarship to the Pennsylvania Academy of Fine Arts. Awarded two Cresson scholarships to pursue additional studies in Europe, he created his first lithograph while visiting Paris in 1928.

As a printmaker, Spruance was known for his innovations in color lithography with series of works relating to mythological and religious themes, as well as portraiture. His work was part of the painting event in the art competition at the 1936 Summer Olympics.

During the 1940s, he garnered two first place honors in competitions hosted by the Library of Congress. In 1941, he won the library's National Exhibition of American Lithography prize, and in 1948, he was awarded first prize at the library's Sixth National Exhibition of Current Prints.

In 1959, his work was exhibited at Lehigh University along with that of George Harding and Schilli Maier in an exhibit organized by Francis Quirk.

In 1965, he was awarded the Philadelphia Art Alliance Medal of Achievement.

After a thirty-three-year tenure at the Philadelphia College of Art, Spruance retired in 1967. That same year, the college hosted a retrospective of his work in September and early October. Featuring examples of the more than four hundred prints that he created throughout his career, more than half of the showcase was drawn from art that Spruance had created during the 1960s.

== Death and funeral ==
Spruance died at the age of sixty-three at his home in the Germantown, Philadelphia neighborhood on December 6, 1967. His funeral was held on Friday, December 8 at St. Paul's Episcopal Church in Chestnut Hill. He was survived by his wife, Winifred Glover Spruance, and stepsons Stephen Glover, of Chestnut Hill, and Peter Benton, of San Francisco, and one grandson.

== Sources ==
- Lloyd M. Abernethy (1988). Benton Spruance, the Artist and the Man. Associated University Presses. p. 159. ISBN 978-0-87982-517-1.
