= Emma Fordyce MacRae =

American painter

- Born: April 27, 1887; Vienna
- Died: August 6, 1974 (aged 86)
- Education: Miss Chapin's School; Brearley School; Art Students League
- Known for: still lifes, paintings of women
- Notable work: Green Jade (1928); A Persian Girl (1936)
- Movement: Philadelphia Ten

Emma Fordyce MacRae (April 27, 1887, Vienna – August 6, 1974) was an American representational painter. She was a member of the Philadelphia Ten, a group of women artists who worked and exhibited together. Her work — including still lifes and paintings of women — shows the influence of Asian flower paintings and of Seurat.

== Biography ==
MacRae grew up in New York City, where she attended Miss Chapin's School and the Brearley School. She enrolled at the Art Students League in 1911, studying first with Frank DuMond and Kenneth Hayes Miller, and beginning in 1915, with Luis Mora, Ernest Blumenschein, and John French Sloan. She also attended one of Robert Reid's summer courses.

MacRae's painting, "Green Jade," was shown at the Anderson Galleries in 1928, at an exhibit of artist members of the American Woman's Association. Many exhibitions and gallery showings followed. In 1937, MacRae's painting "A Persian Girl," was listed as deserving of special mention by The New York Times critic Edward Alden Jewell. In the 1940s, MacRae was chairman of the awards jury of the National Association of Women Artists.

Galleries rediscovered MacRae's art in the 1980s; the Richard York Gallery in New York exhibited thirty of her paintings in December 1983. In 1987, her painting of a Venetian cafe was part of "American Women Artists, 1830-1930," an exhibition displayed at the National Museum of Women in the Arts in Washington, D.C. and in four other museums.

MacRae had studios in New York City and in Gloucester, Massachusetts. Where MacRae painted her New England landscapes form the Cape Ann Landscapes Tour.

Recent exhibitions of MacRae's work have been held at Cape Ann Museum and Greenwich, Connecticut.

== Collections and museums ==
- Museum of Fine Arts, Boston
- Cape Ann Historical Museum, Gloucester, MA
- Cosmopolitan Club, New York
- National Academy of Design, New York

== External resources ==
- Emma Fordyce MacRae (1887-1974), Emma Fordyce MacRae website.
- Emma Fordyce MacRae, Artnet.
- Emma Fordyce MacRae, "Elizabeth" (oil on canvas), The Mint Museums.
- Emma Fordyce MacRae, "Cherry Blossoms," SILS Art Image Browser.

Review.

- American Art Review Volume 20 Number 2 March–April 2008 Article: Paintings of Emma Fordyce MacRae, N.A (1887–1974) by Karen E. Quinn.
