= Maude Drein Bryant =

American painter

- Portrait by Everett Lloyd Bryant
- Born: Maude Drein; May 11, 1880; Wilmington, Delaware
- Died: 1946 (aged 65–66); Wilmington, Delaware
- Known for: Painting
- Spouse: Everett Lloyd Bryant (m. 1904)

Maude Drein Bryant (1880-1946), was an American painter. She was a member of the Philadelphia Ten.

== Biography ==
Bryant was born Maude Drein on May 11, 1880, in Wilmington, Delaware. She attended the Pennsylvania Academy of the Fine Arts, studying under Thomas Anschutz, Hugh H. Breckenridge and William Merritt Chase. In 1914 she won the John Lambert Fund Purchase prize for emerging artists from the Pennsylvania Academy of the Fine Arts for her painting Calendulas and Asters.

She exhibited at the Pennsylvania Academy of the Fine Arts, the Art Institute of Chicago, and the Corcoran Gallery of Art. In 1923 Bryant exhibited with the Philadelphia Ten.

Bryant was tangentially associated with the New Hope artists colony in New Hope, Pennsylvania because of the proximity of her studio in Perkiomen Creek in Hendricks, Pennsylvania, and her plein-air style. She moved away from Hendicks to Wilmington in the last years of her life.

Her husband died in 1945 at the age of 80 and Bryant died in Wilmington in 1946.

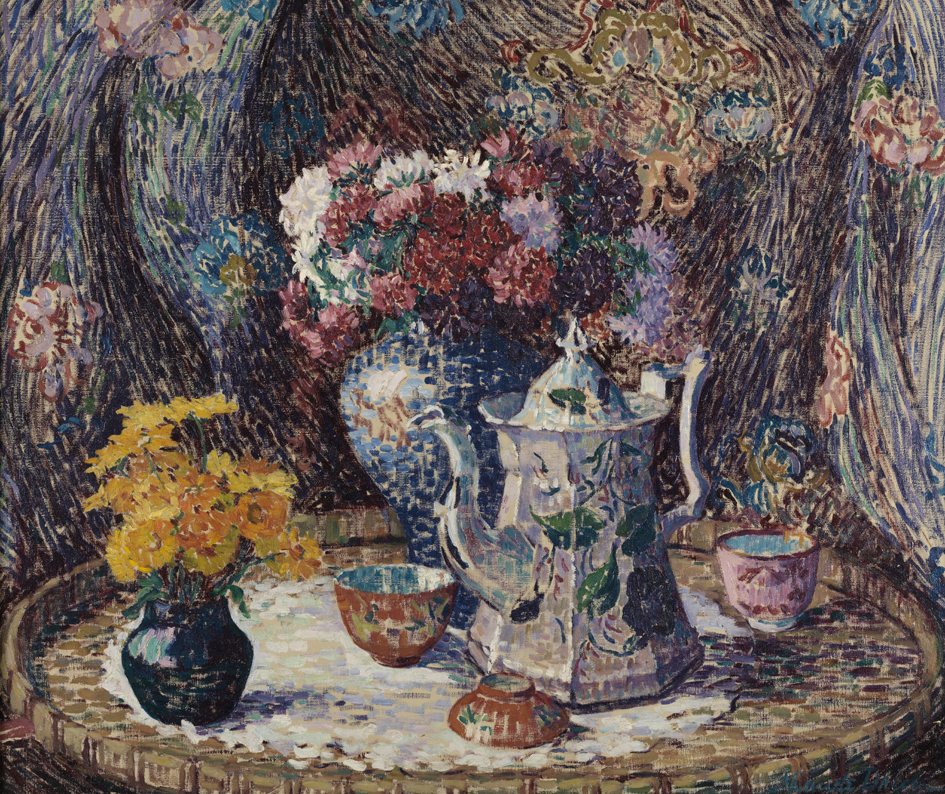
Calendulas and Asters
