= Edward P. Lull =

U.S. Navy officer

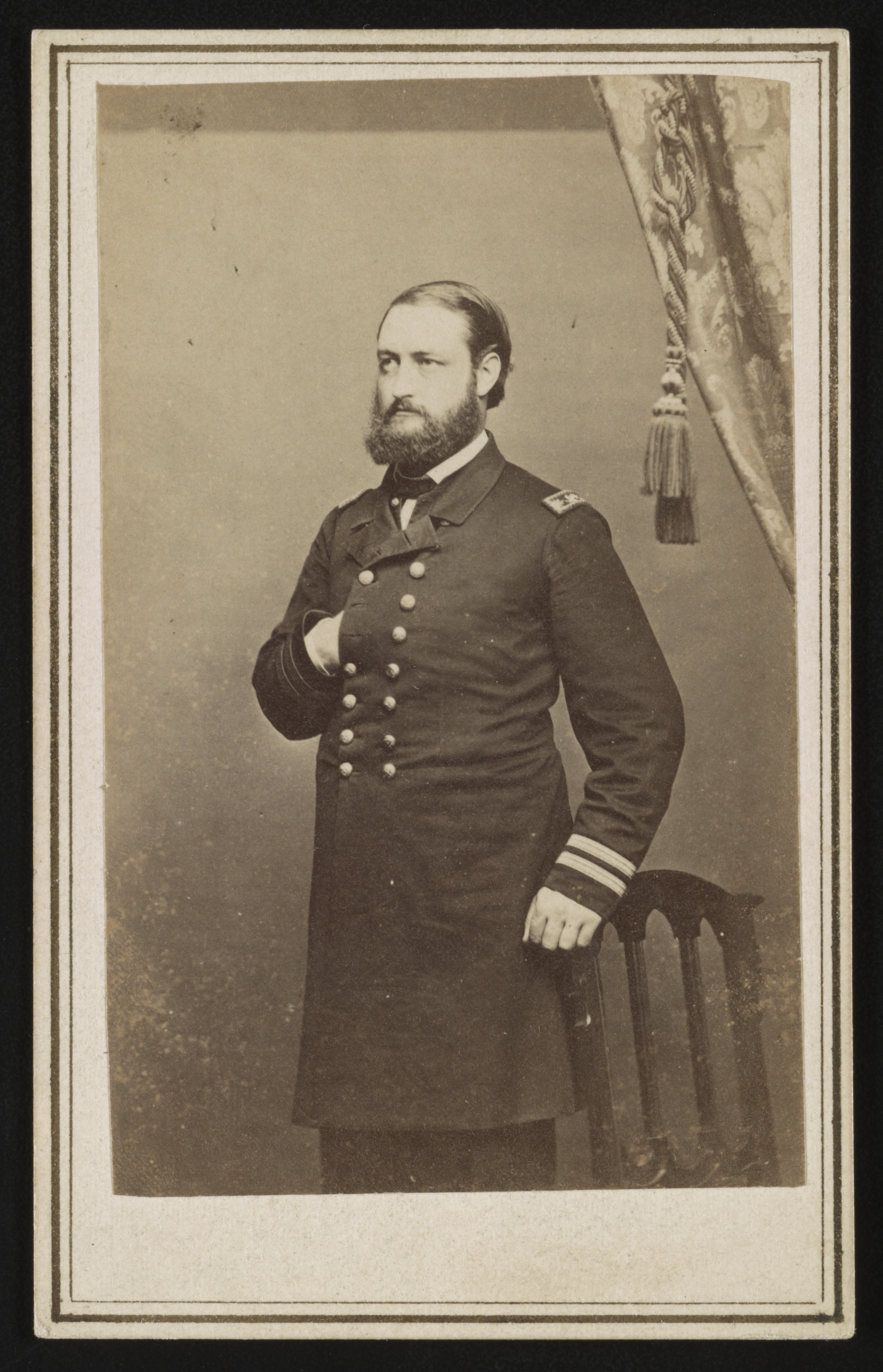

15th Commander of the Department of Alaska
- In office April 10, 1881 – October 18, 1881
- President: James A. Garfield; Chester A. Arthur
- Preceded by: Henry Glass
- Succeeded by: Henry Glass

Personal details
- Born: February 20, 1836 Windsor, Vermont, U.S.
- Died: March 5, 1887 (aged 51) Pensacola, Florida, U.S.
- Resting place: Barrancas National Cemetery; Pensacola, Florida; 30°21′18″N 87°17′09″W
- Children: 4, including Richard.
- Education: United States Naval Academy
- Occupation: Naval officer

Military service
- Allegiance: United States
- Branch/service: United States Navy; Union Navy
- Years of service: 1851-1887
- Rank: Captain
- Commands: USS Roanoke; USS Constitution; USS Brooklyn; USS Tennessee; USS Guard; USS Wachusett; USS Iroquois
- Battles/wars: American Civil War; Union blockade; Battle of Mobile Bay

Edward Phelps Lull (February 20, 1836 – March 5, 1887) was an officer in the United States Navy who served as the commander of the Department of Alaska from August 10, 1881, to October 18, 1881 under Navy Secretary William H. Hunt.

Lull graduated from the US Naval Academy in 1855, and served in the Navy during and after the American Civil War, reaching the rank of captain in October 1881.

== Early life ==
Lull was born February 20, 1836, in Windsor, Vermont to Martha Lucas and Martin Lull. His father died in 1837 when Edward was an infant, and his widowed mother moved their family to the Wisconsin Territory in 1845. He was appointed as an acting midshipman at the United States Naval Academy on October 7, 1851. He graduated in June 1855. In 1860, Lull was an assistant professor of Ethics and English at the Naval Academy.

== Career ==
As a Lieutenant, Lull was assigned to the screw frigate USS Roanoke, and took part in the sinking of the schooner Mary in July 1861 as part of the Union blockade.

From September 1861 to December 1863, he served as commanding officer of the frigate USS Constitution, which was then serving as a training ship for the United States Naval Academy which was relocated to Newport, Rhode Island during the Civil War.

As Commander of the screw sloop USS Brooklyn, Lull took part in the Battle of Mobile Bay, and captured the CSS Tennessee, for which he was later given command of the vessel.

In 1875 he led an expedition to Panama to survey sites for a canal to be cut, which provided much of the basis for creation of the Panama Canal.

On August 10, 1881, Secretary of the Navy William H. Hunt appointed Lull to serve as the fifteenth Commander of the Department of Alaska.

He was a companion of the Military Order of the Loyal Legion of the United States, a military society composed of officers of the Union Armed Forces.

He died in 1887 in Pensacola, Florida while in command of the Pensacola Navy Yard.

== Personal life ==
Lull had four children, including Professor Richard Swann Lull.

== Dates of promotion ==
Rank	Date
Captain	October 1, 1881
Commander	June 10, 1870
Lieutenant Commander	July 16, 1862
Lieutenant	October 30, 1860
Master	November 4, 1858
Passed Midshipman	April 15, 1858
Midshipman	June 9, 1855
Acting Midshipman	October 7, 1851
