= Katharine Hood McCormick =

Katherine Hood McCormick
- Born: 1882; Philadelphia, Pennsylvania
- Died: 1960 (aged 77–78)
- Known for: Painting

Katherine Hood McCormick (1882-1960), was an American painter known for her watercolors and wood block prints. She was an original member of the Philadelphia Ten.

== Biography ==
McCormick was born in 1882 in Philadelphia, Pennsylvania. She attended the Pennsylvania Academy of the Fine Arts, studying under Henry McCarter, and Fred Wagner. She continued her training at Drexel Institute in Philadelphia, and then at the School for Social Research in New York City.

Throughout her career McCormick exhibited at the Pennsylvania Academy of the Fine Arts in Philadelphia and the National Academy of Design in New York. In 1917 she participated in the first exhibition of the Philadelphia Ten at the Art Club of Philadelphia.

McCormick was a member of the Philadelphia Ten, the American Color Print Society, and the Provincetown Printers.

McCormick died in 1960.
