= Genevieve Karr Hamlin =

- Self-portrait, 1938
- Born: July 1, 1896; New York, New York
- Died: 1989 (aged 92–93)
- Known for: Sculpture, Pottery, Educator

Genevieve Karr Hamlin (1896-1989), was an American sculptor and potter. She created the 1926 Exposition of Women's Art & Industries Medal. She was a member of the Philadelphia Ten.

== Biography ==
Hamlin was born July 1, 1896, in New York City. She attended Vassar College.

In 1936 she was included in the exhibition Dance in Arts at the Brooklyn Museum.

She lived in New York City until 1943 when she moved to Vermont to teach at the Putney School. Hamlin also taught at Hartwick College and at Roberson Center for the Arts and Sciences. She then lived in rural New York State, near Harpursville, and established a studio and small farm where she taught art and horseback riding.

Hamlin was a member of the Sculptors Guild, the Cedar Art Gallery, and the Philadelphia Ten.

Hamlin died in 1989.

Her work is included in the decorative art collection of the Cornell University Art Museum.
