= Katharine Marie Barker =

American painter

Katherine Barker Fussell
- Self-portrait
- Born: Katharine Marie Barker; 1891; Pittsburgh, Pennsylvania
- Died: 1984 (aged 92–93)
- Known for: Painting
- Spouse: Howard Fussell (m. 1922)

Katherine Barker Fussell née Barker (1891–1984), was an American painter. She was an original member of the Philadelphia Ten.

== Biography ==
Barker was born in 1891 in Pittsburgh, Pennsylvania. She attended the Pennsylvania Academy of Fine Arts, studying under Philip Leslie Hale, Thomas Anshutz, Emil Carlsen, Robert Vonnoh, and Cecilia Beaux.

In 1917 Barker was included in the Philadelphia Ten's inaugural exhibition.

In 1922 Barker married Howard Fussell with whom she had three children.

After her children began school she resumed painting, specializing in still lifes, landscapes, and portraits.

Barker died in 1984.
