= Mary Louise Lawser =

American sculptor

- Born: 1906
- Died: 1985 (aged 78–79)
- Known for: Sculpture, Muralist

Mary Louise Lawser (1906–1985), was an American muralist and sculptor. She was known for her decorations of streamlined trains. She was a member of the Philadelphia Ten.

== Biography ==
Lawser was born in 1906. She attended Pennsylvania Museum School in Philadelphia, the Pennsylvania Academy of the Fine Arts and École des Beaux Arts.

In the 1940s the architect John Harbeson commissioned Lawser to create a series of murals depicting historical scenes to decorate the railroad cars of the California Zephyr. Lawser also created decorations for railroad cars for the New York Central Railroad, the Atchison, Topeka and Santa Fe Railway, the Seaboard Air Line Railroad, the Denver and Rio Grande Western Railroad, the Western Pacific Railroad, and the Denver Zephyr for the Chicago, Burlington and Quincy Railroad.

Lawser died in 1985.

"Pony Express" by Mary Louise Lawser
