= Edith Longstreth Wood =

American painter

- Born: Edith Longstreth; 1884; Philadelphia, Pennsylvania
- Died: 1967 (aged 82–83)
- Known for: Painting
- Spouse: William Wood (m. 1912–1922)

Edith Longstreth Wood (March 22, 1884 – February 1967) was an American painter. She was a member of the Philadelphia Ten.

== Biography ==
Longstreth was born in Philadelphia, Pennsylvania in 1884. After graduating from Friends' Central School 1901, and then from 1901 to 1905 she attended Bryn Mawr College, and from 1906 to 1907 she attended the Pennsylvania Academy of the Fine Arts.

Wood married William Wood in 1912. The couple lived in California until William's death in 1922, when she returned to Philadelphia.

Wood exhibited regularly at the Philadelphia Print Club, the Pennsylvania Academy of Fine Arts, and the Philadelphia Art Alliance. She was a member of the Philadelphia Art Alliance, the Philadelphia Print Club, the Philadelphia Ten, the Southern Vermont Artists, the Plastic Club, and the North Shore Art Association.

In 1937 the Pennsylvania Academy of Fine Arts purchased her painting "Anemones" for their collection.

"Anemones" ca. 1936 by Edith Longstreth Wood

Wood died in 1967. The same year the Pennsylvania Academy of Fine Arts held a one-woman memorial exhibition of her work.
