= Isabel Branson Cartwright =

American artist

- Born: Isabel Parke Branson; September 4, 1885; Coatesville, Pennsylvania
- Died: June 7, 1966 (aged 80); Carmel, California
- Education: Philadelphia School of Design for Women
- Known for: Philadelphia Ten
- Spouse: John Reagan Cartwright (m. 1910)
- Awards: Alumnae Award 1906

Isabel Parke Branson Cartwright (September 4, 1885 – June 7, 1966) was an American artist born in Coatesville, Pennsylvania.

Cartwright attended the Philadelphia School of Design for Women. In 1906, she won the 'Alumnae Award', a European fellowship allowing her to go abroad for a year. This enabled her to study with Frank Brangwyn, a figure painter in London, for a year, and to travel to Holland, France, and Italy. Other teachers included Elliott Daingerfield and Henry B. Snell.

In November 1910, she married John Reagan Cartwright in El Paso, Texas. They moved to Terrell, Texas until her husband's death in 1917. She went on to have one-woman art shows in San Antonio and Fort Worth, Texas.

After her Texas period, Isabel Cartwright returned to Philadelphia where she joined the Philadelphia Ten. Considered one of the mainstays of the group, she exhibited in all sixty-five shows that it held, over a twenty-eight year span from 1917 to 1945.

Cartwright had a house in the 1940s on Monhegan Island, off the coast of Maine, where she liked to paint. She exhibited at the Pennsylvania Academy of the Fine Arts (1921-1943), and at the National Association of Women Painters and Sculptors.

In 1953, Cartwright moved to the artists' colony of Carmel, California to live with her sister Sarah Branson Cornell. Cartwright died in Ross, California in 1966.
