= Margaret Ralston Gest =

American painter (1900–1965)

- Portrait of Margaret Ralston Gest (artist uncredited)
- Born: 1900; Philadelphia, Pennsylvania, U.S.
- Died: 1965 (aged 64–65)
- Resting place: Laurel Hill Cemetery, Philadelphia, Pennsylvania, U.S.
- Known for: Painting

Margaret Ralston Gest (1900-1965) was an American painter. She was a member of the Philadelphia Ten.

== Biography ==
Gest was born in 1900 in Philadelphia, Pennsylvania. She attended the Philadelphia Museum School of Industrial Art from 1920 to 1924, the Pennsylvania Academy of the Fine Arts from 1924 to 1928, and L'Academie Scandinave, Paris from 1928 to 1929. Gest was known for her Cubist style, primarily in watercolors and multicultural approach.

From 1927 through 1960 Gest exhibited regularly at the Pennsylvania Academy of the Fine Arts. She was a member of the Philadelphia Water Color Club, the Contemporary Club, the North Shore Art Association, the Plastic Club, and the Woodmere Gallery.

Gest lived most of the year in Philadelphia. spending summers in Gloucester, Massachusetts. She died in 1965 and was interred at Laurel Hill Cemetery in Philadelphia.

== Legacy ==
In 1977 her library was auctioned at Sotheby's in London.

Gest's work was included in the 1998 retrospective, "The Philadelphia Ten" at the Moore College of Art & Design. Gest was a benefactor of Haverford College with a religious theme, and the Haverford College Quaker & Special Collections offers a "Gest Fellowship"
