= Nancy Maybin Ferguson =

American painter

- Born: 1872; Philadelphia, Pennsylvania
- Died: 1967 (aged 94–95)
- Known for: Painting

Nancy Maybin Ferguson (1872–1967), was an American painter whose career spanned decades. She is known for her plein-air paintings. She was a member of the Philadelphia Ten.

== Biography ==
Ferguson was born in 1872 in Philadelphia, Pennsylvania. She attended the Philadelphia School of Design for Women, studying under Elliot Daingerfield. She also attended the Pennsylvania Academy of the Fine Arts where her instructors included Charles Hawthorne, William Merritt Chase, Arthur Carles and Hugh H. Breckenridge.

Ferguson exhibited at the Pennsylvania Academy of the Fine Arts, the Corcoran Gallery of Art, the Philadelphia Sketch Club, the National Association of Women Painters and Sculptors, the Woodmere Art Museum, the Philadelphia School of Design for Women, the National Academy of Design, and the Art Institute of Chicago.

Albert Barnes purchased her painting The Red Banner for his collection.

Ferguson divided her time between Philadelphia, Pennsylvania and Provincetown, Massachusetts, both of which were subjects of her landscapes over the course of her career.

She died in 1967.
