= Mary-Russell Ferrell Colton =

American artist, author, educator (1889–1971)

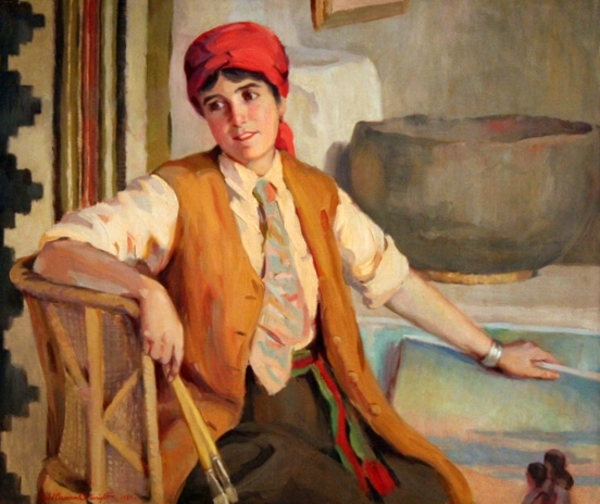
- 1927 portrait of Mary-Russell Ferrell Colton by Isabel Branson Cartwright
- Born: March 25, 1889; Louisville, Kentucky, U.S.
- Died: July 26, 1971 (aged 82); Phoenix, Arizona, U.S.
- Resting place: West Laurel Hill Cemetery, Bala Cynwyd, Pennsylvania, U.S.
- Known for: Founder of the Museum of Northern Arizona; Member of the Philadelphia Ten; Inducted into the Arizona Women's Hall of Fame
- Notable work: Church at Ranchos de Taos; Edmund Nequatewa; Walpi; Navajo Shepardess; Sunset and Moonglow; Lonesome Hole; Sedona From Red Ledge

Mary-Russell Ferrell Colton (March 25, 1889 – July 26, 1971) née Mary-Russell Ferrell, was an American artist, author, educator, ethnographer, and curator. She is one of the principal founders of the Museum of Northern Arizona. She was a member of the Philadelphia Ten and exhibited her art at the group's annual shows from 1926 to 1940. She was a member of the National Association of Women Painters and Sculptors, the American Watercolor Society, and the American Federation of Arts. She was known for her advocacy of the arts, Native American rights, and women's rights. For her advocacy of Native American arts, she received a certificate of appreciation from the United States Department of the Interior, Indian Arts and Crafts Board in 1935. In 1981, she was inducted into the Arizona Women's Hall of Fame.

== Early life ==
Mary-Russell Ferrell was born on March 25, 1889, in Louisville, Kentucky. She was the second daughter of Joseph and Elise (née Houston) Ferrell, though her elder sister died of diphtheria when Mary-Russell was two. She was born in the home of her maternal grandparents, Judge Russell Houston, a former Chief Justice of the Tennessee Supreme Court, and Griselda Polk Houston (a descendent of President James K. Polk). Joseph Ferrell was known as one of the first Anglo-Americans to explore the Tenaya Canyon in what is now Yosemite National Park.

She was taught by a governess until she was eight years old, when she entered the private girl''s school Pelham Academy. However, she received a more casual education from her family.

In 1904, Joseph Ferrell died, leaving Elise and Mary-Russell in a dire financial situation. A family friend offered to pay Mary-Russell's tuition at the Philadelphia School of Design for Women, where Mary-Russell began in 1904. Mary-Russell graduated in 1909 and graduated with honors. After her graduation, she opened a studio in Philadelphia. Her projects included art restoration and commercial art projects. In addition to the commercial art her studio produced, Mary-Russell Ferrell showed as a member of the Philadelphia Ten's annual exhibit in Florida, the Midwest, the Eastern States of the US and Europe.

During this time, Elise Ferrell remarried businessman Theodore Presser. In her early career, Mary-Russell lived with the Pressers, but she did not get along with her step-father. In an effort to improve the relationship, Elise used a family connection to gain Mary-Russell membership of Dr.Charles Shaw's 1909 expedition to the Selkirk Mountains. This journey inspired Mary-Russell's love of the American West, and gave her the nickname "Fairy," which stuck with her for decades.

In 1910, Dr. Shaw invited Mary-Russell onto another expedition. While preparing for the journey, she met Harold Sellers Colton, a zoology professor at the University of Pennsylvania who would join the trip. In July, Dr. Shaw brought Colton and another traveller to civilization so they could conduct further research in California. On the way back to the main group, Dr. Shaw drowned when his canoe overturned. Colton rejoined the remaining group in Los Angeles, and continued with them to explore. After returning to Philadelphia, Colton and Ferrell corresponded and eventually courted, marrying on May 23, 1912, in Philadelphia.

For their honeymoon, the Coltons took the Santa Fe Railroad to Glorieta, New Mexico, where they camped, visited nearby cities, and visited local archeological ruins and villages. They went on to visit the Grand Canyon, San Diego, San Francisco, Yosemite, Portland, Seattle, the Selkirk Mountains, and Yellowstone. This first visit established the direction of the rest of their marriage, which was became based in the Southwest. The next summer, the Coltons returned to the Colorado Plateau. In this trip, they had their first interaction with Puebloans. The Coltons regularly travelled to the Colorado Plateau over the next several years.

They had two sons, Joseph Ferrell, born in 1914, and Sabin born in 1917. Sabin died of valley fever in Tucson in 1924. Their marriage lasted until her death.

In April 1926, the Coltons permanently moved to Flagstaff, Arizona, which had become a temporary home during their trips.

== Professional life ==
As both Coltons were independently wealthy (though Mary-Russell inherited her wealth later in life), they were able to comfortably work without substantial pay, travel, and "pursue their interests at will".

The Coltons often collaborated on projects. Im 1918, the co-authored an article title ""The Little Known Small House Ruins in the Coconino Forest."

In the 1920s, concerns arose in Flagstaff regarding local cultural heritage being sent to collections in the eastern United States, stripping the area of its culture. In 1924, Dr. Colton provided funds for artifact display cases in the new Flagstaff Woman's Club clubhouse to feature mostly artifacts from private collections. As the collection grew, the Coltons realized the need for a permanent museum. However, they disagreed regarding the focus of the museum, with Dr. Colton believing the focus should be on the region's archeology, geology, and biology, and Mrs. Colton arguing for a focus on promoting contemporary Native American artists. Her biographer, Burns, comments that her focus was sometimes paternalistic.

=== Museum of Northern Arizona ===
Colton raised funds for the creation of the museum– largely from people not active in the arts. In 1927, the Northern Arizona Society of Science and Art (NASSA) was established with Dr. Colton as president, and the next year the Museum of Northern Arizona was created. Mrs. Colton was appointed as Curator of Art, and soon promoted to Curator of Art and Ethnology. When NASSA was incorporated in 1933, Colton donated twenty-nine acres of land in memory of her son, Sabin, to house the collection. The museum opened in 1937.

Colton built the Museum's art collection, with a general focus on the art of the American West. The Museum of Northern Arizona both brought in exhibits from major institutions and sent exhibits to many other institutions. In 1939, Colton established an annual photographic exhibition, Arizona Photographers. Though the exhibition was short-lived, it was the first Arizona exhibit to feature photography as an artistic medium.

Colton served as the curator of art for the Museum of Northern Arizona for 20 years. She also recorded the history of the Colorado Plateau through her paintings and her MNA exhibits. She wrote 21 articles and two books. As an artist and the curator of art at the museum, Colton often worked with Native American artists to bring recognition and acceptance of their work into the international art community. As the museum expanded, the Coltons continued to donate land to the museum.

Colton retired from her position as Curator of Art and Ethnology in 1948 due to her declining health. She was appointed to chair the new Art Committee at the museum. She held this position until 1958.

=== Education ===
Colton was interested in education surrounding the Colorado Plateau. She wanted to teach Plateau residents about the local environment and cultural heritage, visitors about the Plateau more generally, and the general public about Sense of place. In 1931, Colton established a Junior Art Show to exhibit works by 4th through 8th grade students from public and reservation schools in northern Arizona.

In 1934, Colton published Art for the Schools of the Southwest – An Outline for the Public and Indian Schools, in which she advocated for widespread art education and the teaching of traditional methods, materials, and designs.

=== Work with Native American Art ===
Through Colton's writing, painting and work as an advocate of Native American peoples and Native American arts, she made contributions to progressive education, the Indian arts and crafts movement and archeology. Colton believed in the (incorrect) Vanishing Race Theory, and so "conducted her work with a sense of urgency." Although she was benevolent, her work was sometimes viewed as intrusive or paternalistic.

Colton championed traditional methods, materials, and forms. She objected to "introducing native peoples to outside art influences" that would lead to the separation from their roots, and that the commercialization of Native American art was degrading its quality. She used her financial influence to encourage the use of traditional materials, such as vegetable dies rather than commercial ones. Colton also saw that certain materials had been altered; for example, Hopi no longer grew cotton, so the quality of cotton textiles had decreased with imported cotton, and imported Merino sheep had degraded the quality of wool textiles. Colton worked with Hopi traders and artists to help them address these issues.

Colton believed that the Native American arts could be saved through education and should be taught at schools. Her realization that higher quality products would generate more money than cheap ones led to her endeavors to shape the Hopi arts.

In 1930, Colton founded the Hopi Craftsman Exhibition. She modeled the exhibition on the Santa Fe Indian Market and the Gallup Inter-Tribal Indian Ceremonial. In March, Coltons travelled to the Hopi pueblos to spark interest in the exhibition, returning in June to collect art to showcase. The exhibition opened on July 2, 1930, and lasted until July 9, with about 1,000 people in attendance. The show was judged and juried, with only prize-worthy works accepted. Colton referred to the exhibition as a scientific experiment in changing Hopi arts by educating both the Hopi and the larger art market. Colton served as a judge until 1960, when health complications made her retire. Colton conducted ethnographic research of the Hopi during the exhibition. In 1936, Colton attempted to create a Navajo Arts and Crafts Exhibition. However, it was more difficult for her to establish contact with the more migratory and less condensed Navajo artists.

Colton also shared Native American work through the "Craftsmen of the Painted Desert" exhibit. This trunk show travelled to schools and museums around the United States with lesson plans and art objects about Hopi and Navajo art.

In 1938, Colton began a project aiming to revive Hopi silversmithing and give it a unique identity. The Coltons presented designs developed by Virgil Hubert to the Indian Arts and Crafts Board for approval and the Hopi for inspiration. They also introduced a method of silversmithing Hubert had developed that would allow them to put finely detailed designs on silver, and Colton promised that the museum would purchase works created using the experimental methods.

=== Art ===
Colton majored in portraiture at the Philadelphia School of Design for Women. However, she began primarily painting landscapes.

Colton was a founding member of the Philadelphia Ten, a group of female artists formed by alumni of the Philadelphia School of Design for Women. Even as she left the Philadelphia area, she continued to stay involved with the group. Her works were critically acclaimed in almost all of the Philadelphia Ten exhibitions.

The Christian Science Monitor of September 2, 1920, printed a copy of Colton's painting, Sunset on a Lava Field. The author wrote; "In her Arizona canvases, Mrs. Colton gives full sway to her love of color. One is impressed by the sense of vast remoteness that she manages to capture for these western paintings that are bringing her increasing recognition."

Colton's work was shown in other exhibitions as well, including an American Federation of Arts exhibition (1931), a National Association of Women Painters and Sculptors exhibition (1933), and a solo exhibition at the Arizona State Teacher's College at Flagstaff.

As her health issues increased in the 1940s and 1950s, Colton painted less frequently. She completed her last painting, "Courthouse Rock," in 1951. She continued to create work with pencil and charcoal over the next several years.

Colton painted in and around the Colorado Plateau. Throughout her career as an artist, Colton painted a variety of subjects including landscapes, figures, still life and genre scenes. She is known for her sensitive portraits utilizing vibrant, unusual color values. She often painted people she knew, and her work was shown at the Museum of Northern Arizona and at the Hopi Craftsman Show. Colton is best known, though, for her landscapes.

Prominent works include

- Church at Ranchos de Taos (c. 1913)
- Edmund Nequatewa (c. 1942)
- Walpi (c. 1914)
- Navajo Shepardess (c. 1916)
- Sunset and Moonglow (c. 1917)
- Lonesome Hole (c. 1929)
- Sedona From Red Ledge (c. 1952)
- Sunset on a Lava Field (c. 1919)

=== Exhibitions ===
Mary-Russell Ferrell Colton: Artist and Advocate in Early Arizona. Museum of Northern Arizona, June 17–October 28, 2012; Desert Caballeros Western Museum, Wickenburg, Arizona, December 14, 2012, to March 3, 2013.

== Later life, death and legacy ==
During World War I, Colton began to paint less. She chaired the Red Cross's Nurse's Aide program and dedicated her time to her victory garden.

Colton became increasingly reclusive. She suffered from paranoia and was reluctant to leave her home, eventually being diagnosed with Atherosclerosis of the brain (possibly actually Alzheimer's disease). In 1958, Dr. Colton resigned as museum director to become her caretaker and to have time for his personal projects.

In 1959, the Indian Arts and Crafts Board honored Colton with a Citation of Merit.

In 1962, Dr. Colton was no longer able to take care of his wife. When she attacked him with a paperweight, she was sedated and taken to Camelback Hospital in a mortician's ambulance. Colton was later transferred to the Bell's Lodge nursing home, where she lived until she died on July 16, 1971. Despite her wishes for her ashes, mixed with her husband's be spread across the Painted Desert, they were buried on the Colton family plot in West Laurel Hill Cemetery in Bala Cynwyd, Pennsylvania.

Colton was among the first women inducted into the Arizona Women's Hall of Fame in 1981.

In 2012, the Museum of Northern Arizona held an exhibit focusing on Colton's life and work.

== Published works ==
- Colton, Mary-Russell Ferrell. Hopi Dyes, Flagstaff: Museum of Northern Arizona, 1965.
- Colton, Mary-Russell Ferrell and Harold Sellers. "Petroglyphs, the record of a great adventure", Washington D.C. American Anthropologist, 1931.
- Colton, Mary-Russell Ferrell; Nonabah Gorman Bryan; Stella Young. Navajo and Hopi Dyes, Salt Lake City, Utah: Historic Indian Publishers, 1965. ISBN 978-1-883736-08-8
- Colton, Mary-Russell Ferrell. Art for the schools of the Southwest, an outline for the public and Indian schools, Museum Bulletin, No. 6, Flagstaff, Arizona, Northern Arizona Society of Science and Art, 1934.
- Colton, Mary-Russell Ferrell and Edmund Nequatewa. Truth of a Hopi and other clan stories of Shung-Opovi, Museum of Northern Arizona. No. 8, Flagstaff, Arizona, Northern Arizona Society of Science and Art, 1947.
- Colton, Mary-Russell Ferrell. "Hopi silversmithing, its background and future", Plateau, Vol. 12, No. 1, Flagstaff, Arizona, Northern Arizona Society of Science and Art, 1939.
- Colton, Mary-Russell Ferrell. "Letter to the Editor", Coconino Sun, August 12, 1927.
- Colton, Mary-Russell Ferrell, and Harold Sellers. The Little Known Small House Ruins in the Coconino Forest, Memoirs of the American Anthropological Association Vol. 5. Lancaster, Pennsylvania, American Anthropological Association, 1918.
- Colton, Mary-Russell Ferrell. "Technique of Major Hopi Crafts", Museum Notes. Vol. 3, No 12. Flagstaff, Arizona, Museum of Northern Arizona, 1931.
