= Art Club of Philadelphia =

Coordinates: 39.94856°N 75.16464°W

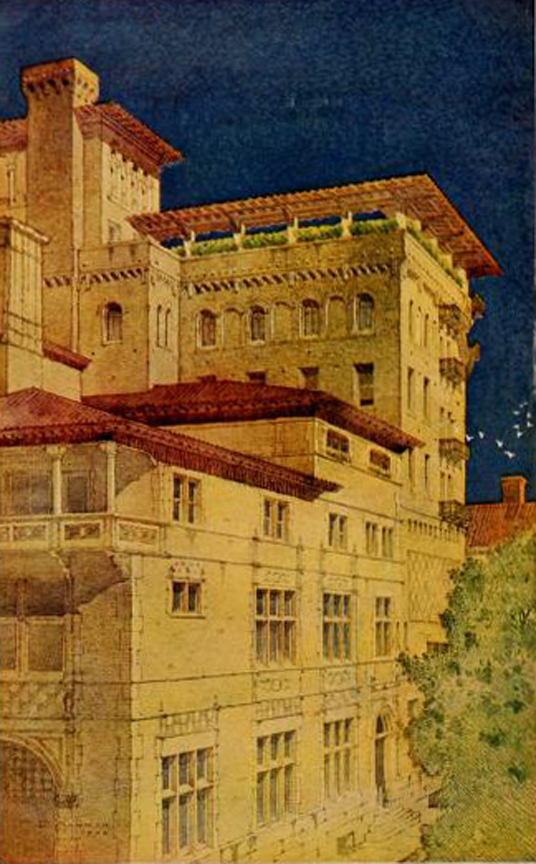
Art Club of Philadelphia at 220 S. Broad Street, designed by Frank Miles Day

The Art Club of Philadelphia, often called the Philadelphia Art Club, was a club in Philadelphia, founded on February 7, 1887, to advance the arts. It took on the same spirit as the Century Club of New York City: a comfortable, even opulent, place for member artists and art amateurs to work, stay, and socialize.

Its charter proclaimed:

The objects of the Club shall be to advance the knowledge and love of the Fine Arts, through the exhibition of works of Art, the acquisition of books and papers for the purpose of forming an Art library, lectures upon subjects pertaining to Art, receptions given to men or women distinguished in Art, Literature, Science or Politics, and by other kindred means, and to promote social intercourse among its members.

The Art Club was one of the country's leading venues for solo and group art shows. Each year, the club presented a gold medal to the artist of an outstanding work, an art award that was viewed as one of the nation's most prestigious.

The club dissolved on November 9, 1940.

The building demolished in 1975, a 475-space parking garage now stands in its place.

== Building ==
The 1888 architectural competition to design the building was won by 27-year-old Frank Miles Day. His entry was selected over those of established firms such as Wilson Eyre, Cope and Stewardson, Willis G. Hale, Hazlehurst & Huckel, and others.

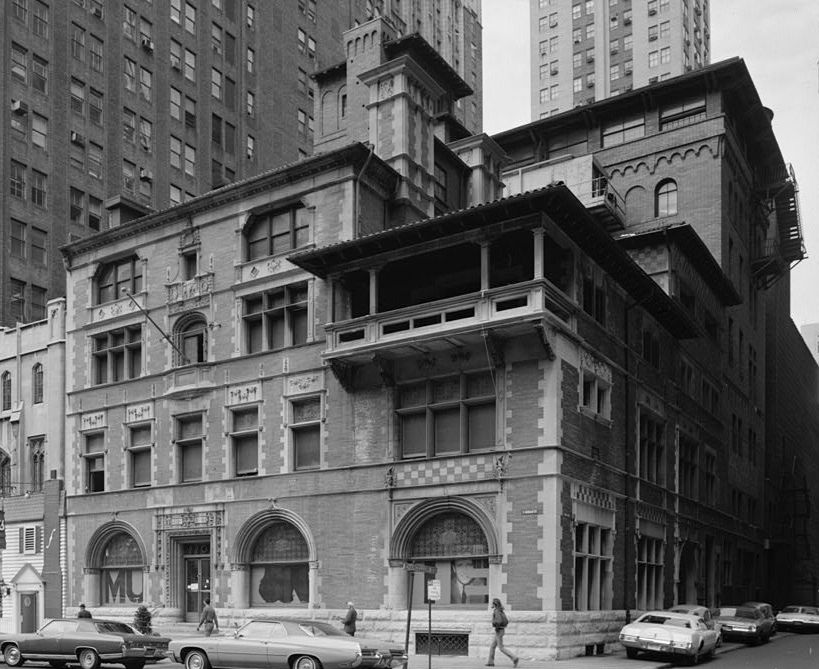

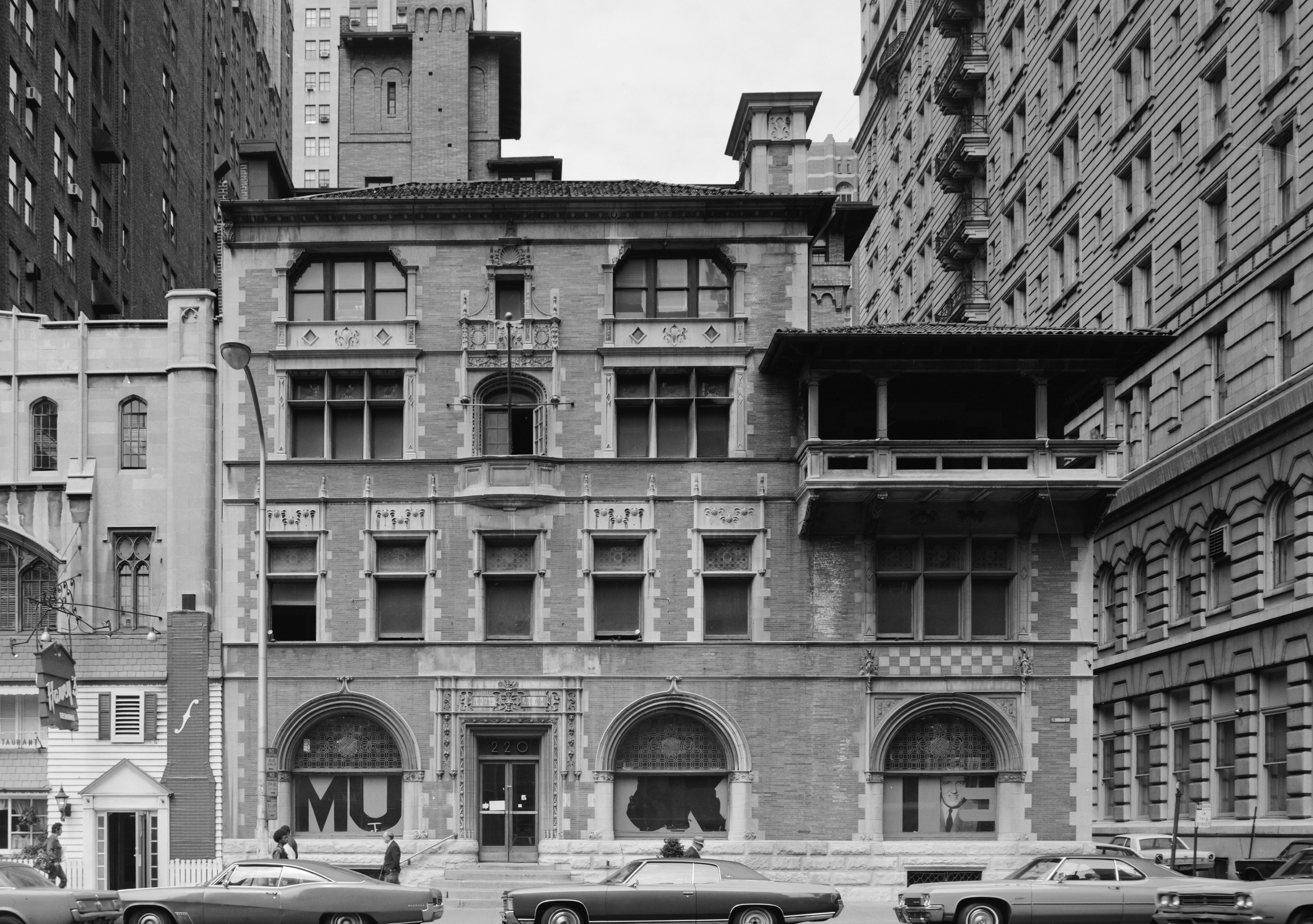

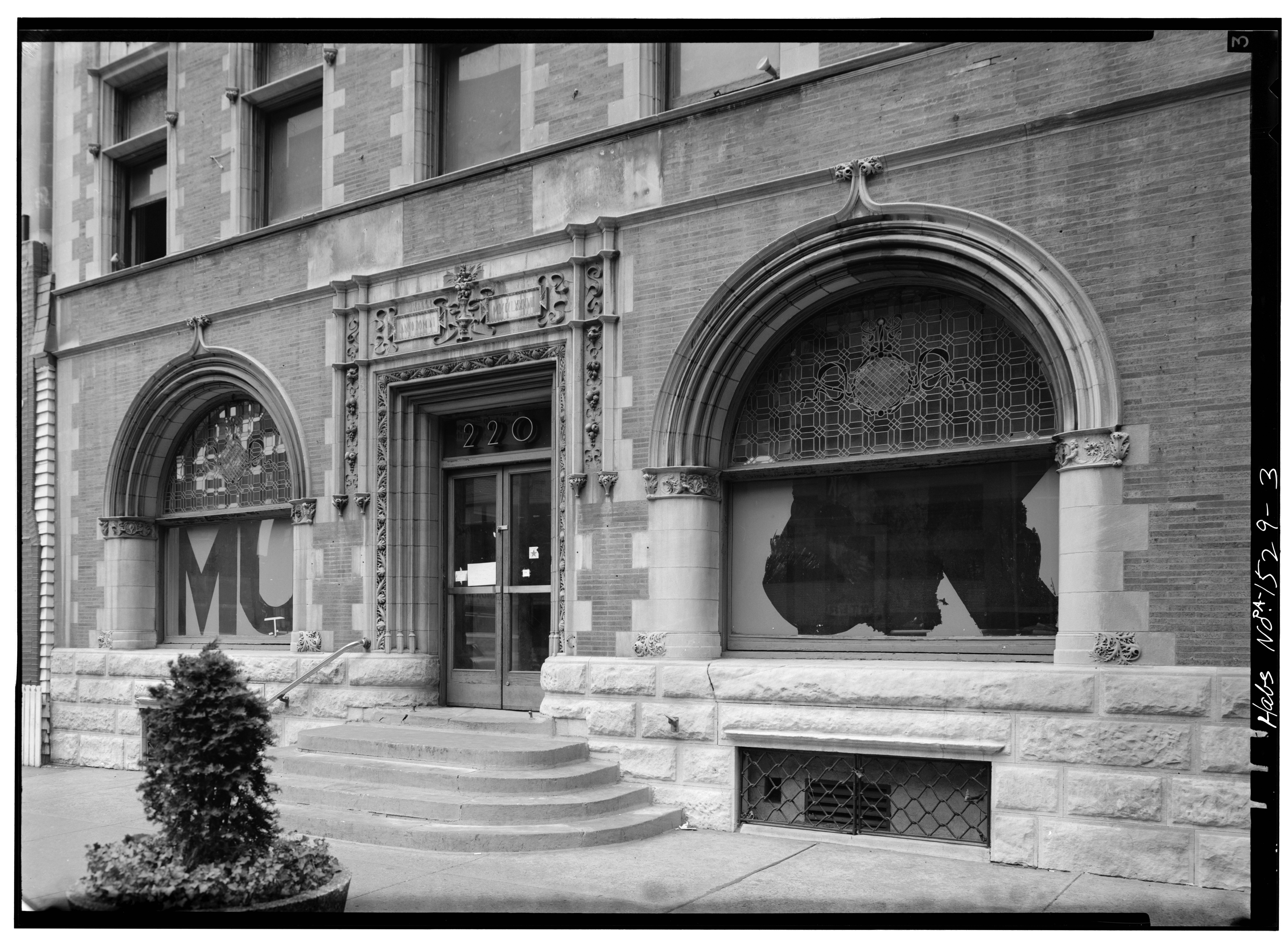

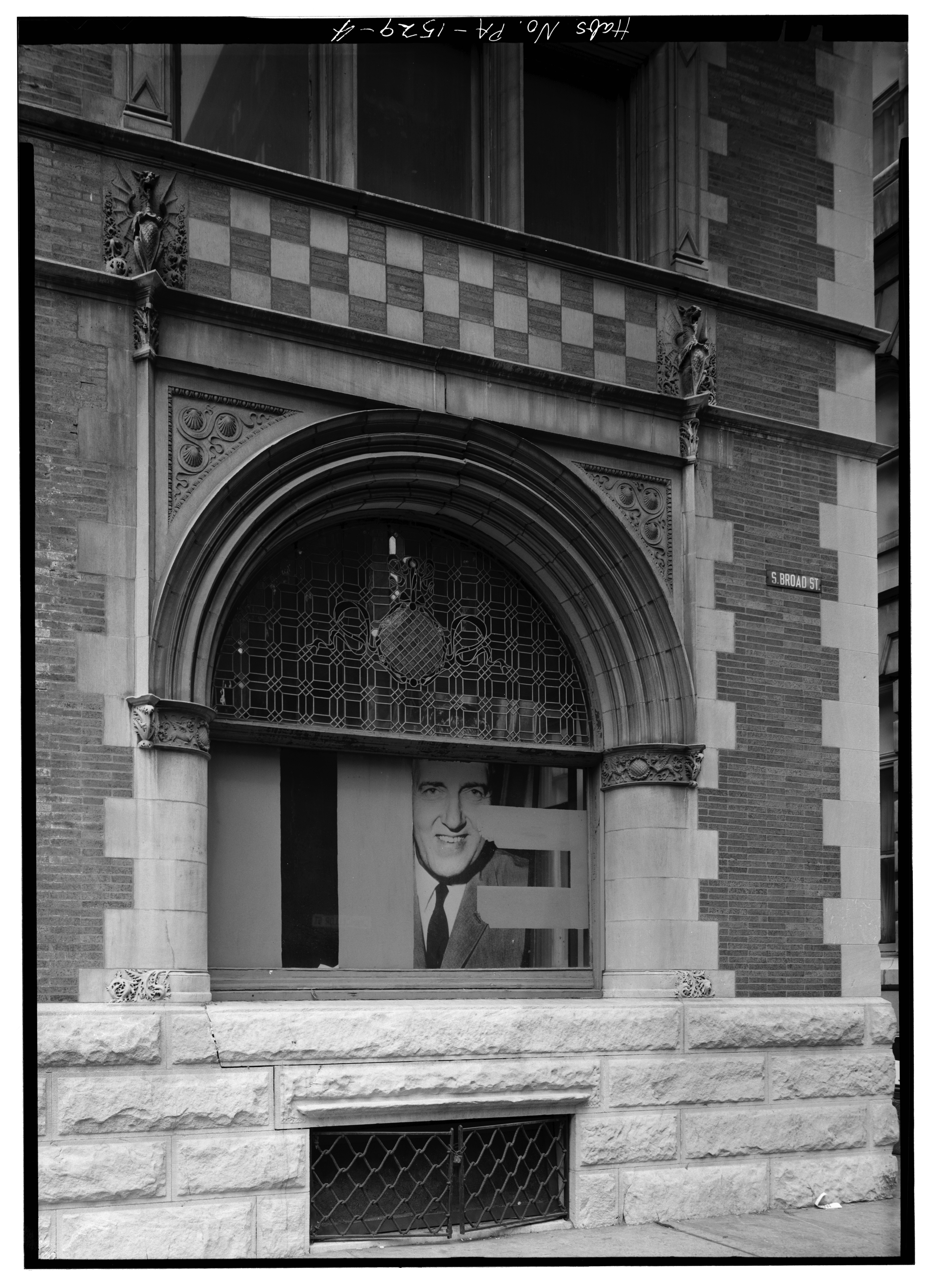
