= Henry B. Snell =

American painter

- Born: Henry Bayley Snell; September 29, 1858; Richmond, United Kingdom
- Died: January 17, 1943 (aged 84); New Hope, Pennsylvania, United States
- Known for: Painting
- Movement: American Impressionism
- Spouse: Florence Francis (m. 1888)

Henry Bayley Snell (September 29, 1858 – January 17, 1943) was an American Impressionist painter and educator. Snell's paintings are in museum collections including the Metropolitan Museum of Art in New York City, the Albright–Knox Art Gallery in Buffalo, and the Pennsylvania Academy in Philadelphia.

== Biography ==
Snell was born on September 29, 1858, in Richmond, England. In 1875 he emigrated to the New York City where he studied at the Art Students League. Snell supported himself in the 1880s by producing marine scenes at the Photoengraving Company. There he met follow artist William Langson Lathrop. In 1888 Snell married Florence Francis. Around that time Lathrop introduced the Snells to Bucks County Pennsylvania.

In 1899 Snell began teaching at the Philadelphia School of Design for Women, where he remained until 1943. He was an influential teacher, instructing several of the founding members of the Philadelphia Ten, including Theresa Bernstein.

In 1921 he co-founded, with Frank Leonard Allen, the "Boothbay Studios" in Boothbay Harbor, Maine, which operated as a summer school.

Snell exhibited at the Pennsylvania Academy, the Art Club of Philadelphia, and the Salmagundi Club in New York, serving as its president from 1908 to 1910. He was awarded both gold and silver medals at the Panama–Pacific International Exposition of 1915.

Snell died in New Hope, Pennsylvania, on January 17, 1943.

Old Farm House Ca. 1920s.
