= Reading Public Museum =

Museum in West Reading, Pennsylvania, US

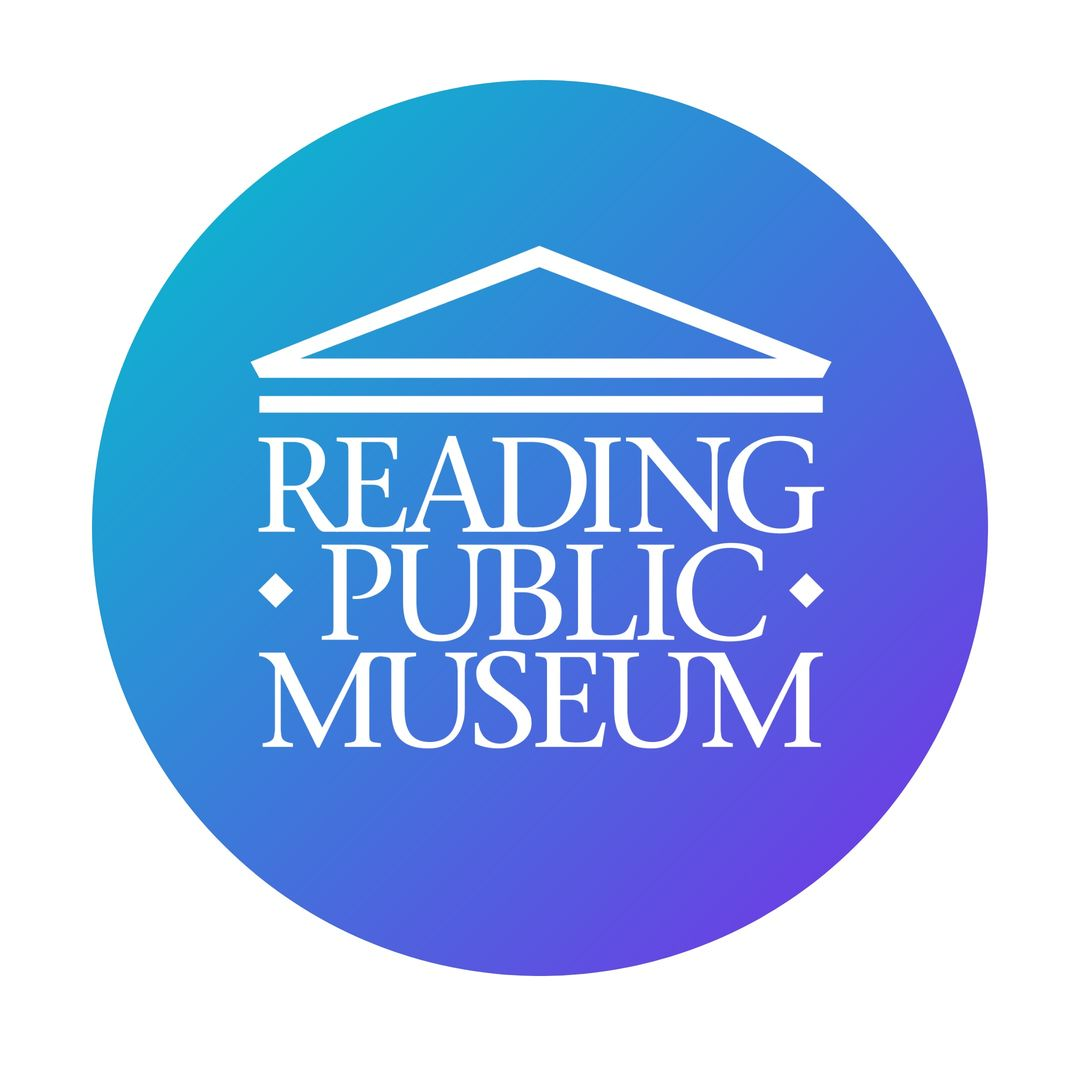

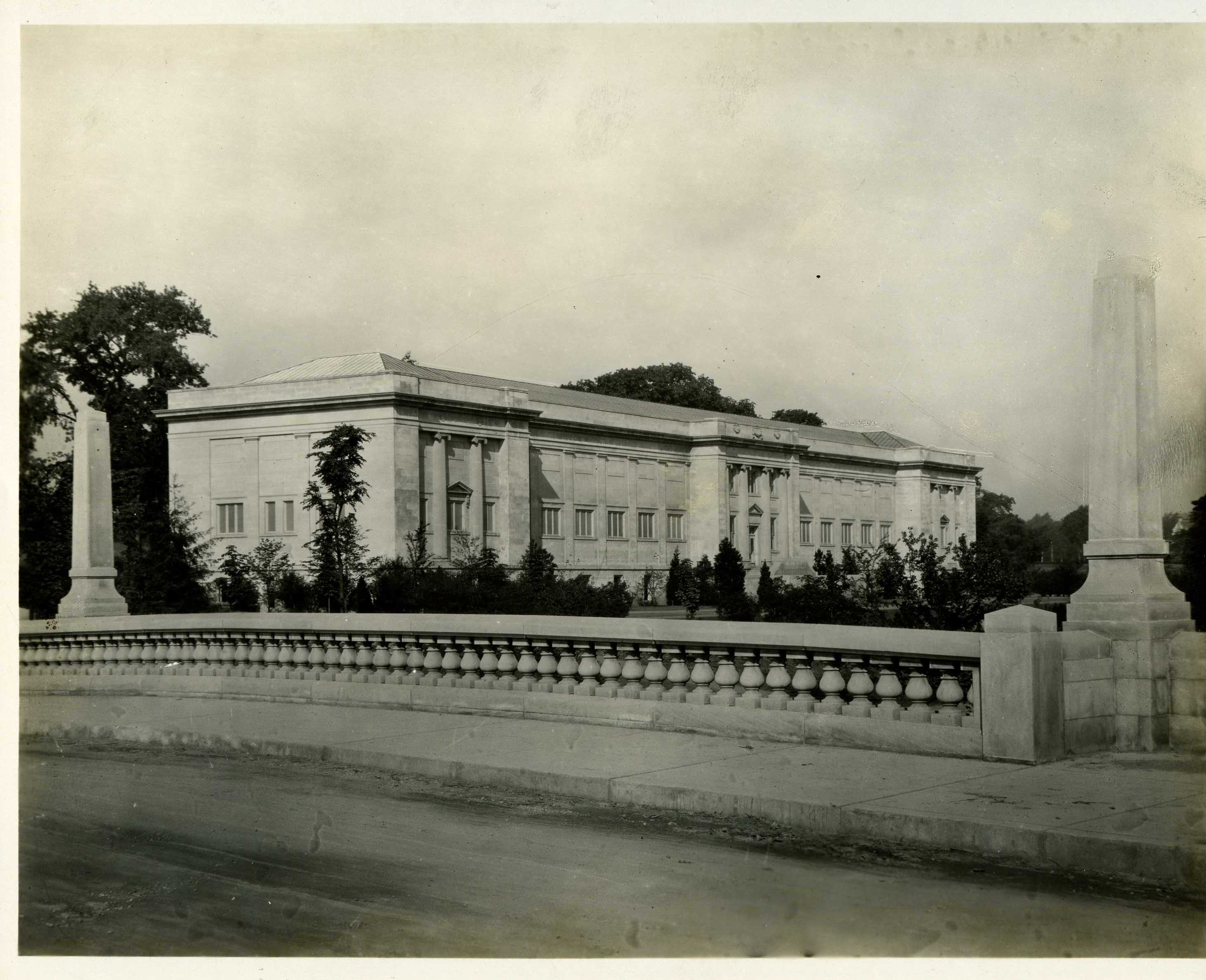
- Outside view from Museum Road, c. 1929
- Interactive fullscreen map
- Location: West Reading, Pennsylvania
- Coordinates: 40.3274°N 75.9514°W

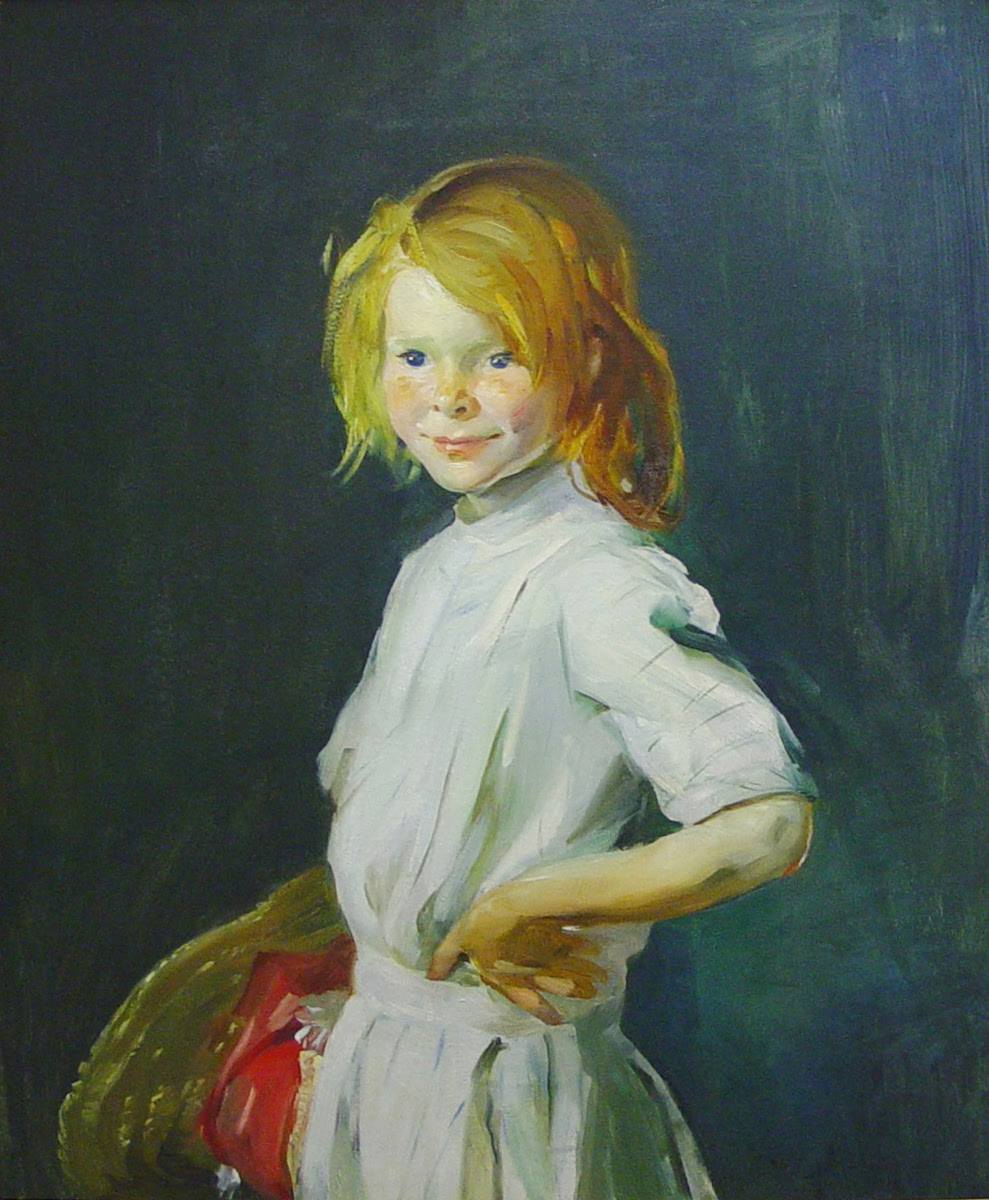
Alice Kent Stoddard (American, 1883–1976), Leila, 1915, oil on canvas, 30 x 25 inches, Reading Public Museum, Gift, George D. Horst

The Reading Public Museum is a museum in Reading, Pennsylvania, located in the 18th Ward, along the Wyomissing Creek. By the size and scope of its collection, numbering more than 280,000 objects and specimens, it is the largest private museum and largest collection of artwork, numbering over 50,000 works, located between Philadelphia and Pittsburgh. The museum's permanent collection focuses primarily on art, science, and cultural artifacts and its site also features the Neag planetarium and a 25-acre (100,000 m^{2}) arboretum filled with rare plants and champion trees.

The Museum has a long history of innovative programming and exhibitions, including hosting major solo exhibitions and retrospectives for artists such as Alexandre Iacovleff (1947); Claude Venard (1969); Valfred Thelin (1969); Tetsuro Sawada (1970); Gloria Vanderbilt (1971); Marsden Hartley (1971); Robert Indiana (1983); Jimmy Ernst (1991); Liliana Porter (1993); Brigitta Bertoia (1994); Reuben Nakian, (1999); Dan Namingha (1991) and David Lynch (2003) among others. It was one of the first museums in the United States to exhibit, in 1937, the original cartoons and drawings of the noted animator and film executive Walt Disney (1901–1966); and was the very first museum in the world to both exhibit a work by and award a prize to the internationally recognized pop artist and Pennsylvania native Keith Haring (1958–1990).

== History ==
The Museum was founded in 1904, when the Reading School District board authorized the purchase of exhibits from the Saint Louis World's Fair. These new purchases were added to the private natural history collections of Dr. Levi W. Mengel. The Museum opened its doors, at the old school administration building on Washington and Eighth streets, to the general public in 1913; that same year, The Museum started collecting works of art. While the name 'public' has always been a part of the museum's name, it was, in fact, founded as a private institution. Originally the museum was not open to the general public, but was only accessible to the students of the Reading School District to support their studies.

Levi Mengel was The Museum's first director and was its founding father. Christopher Shearer, a well-known landscape artist was The Museum's first curator of art. Ground was broken at its current location in February 1925; the foundation stone was laid on May 1, 1925, and by 1928, the Museum was officially opened to the public in its new Beaux-Art style structure that was designed by Alexander Forbes Smith. In 1998, architect Der Scutt was commissioned to add an atrium entrance to the existing structure. The Arboretum was planned in the late-1920s by renowned American landscape architect John Nolen and outfitted with rare plant and flower specimens from the personal collection of noted Irisarian Bertrand H. Farr (1863–1924). Since 1991, The Museum has been operated by The Foundation for the Reading Public Museum. The Museum has been accredited by the American Alliance of Museums since 1982.

== Art collections ==
=== American art ===
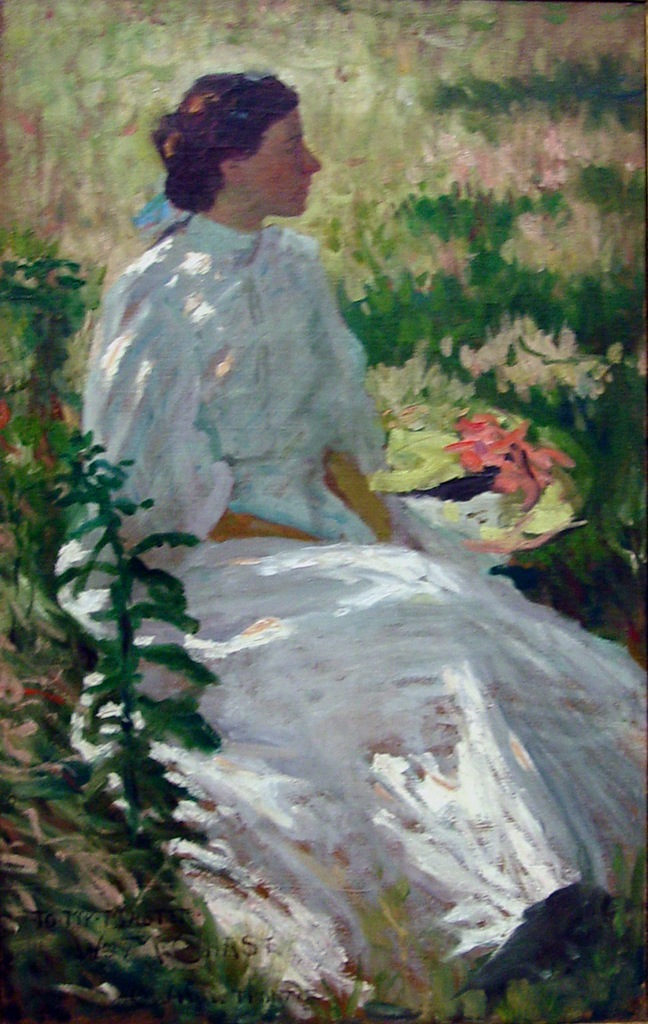
A Study in White (undated), by Charles Webster Hawthorne

American art has anchored the Museum's collection since 1913. What began with the purchase of a winter landscape by the local artist Victor Shearer quickly expanded as curators regularly acquired works from the Annual Exhibitions at the Pennsylvania Academy of the Fine Arts, securing examples by leading national figures.

A very early acquisition of a painting by Mary B. Leisz proved especially significant, establishing a century-long commitment to collecting works by both emerging and prominent women artists. The Philadelphia Ten, a group of women who exhibited together between 1917 and 1945, is well represented in RPM's collection. Artists include Theresa Bernstein, Cora Smalley Brooks, Fern Coppedge, Nancy Maybin Ferguson, Harriett Frishmuth, and Arrah Lee Gaul. Other prominent women in The Museums’ holdings include Susan McDowell Eakins, Peale Family descendant Ella Sophonisba Hergesheimer, Mary Parker Kornhauser, Tillie Neville Prizer, Mary Heister Reid, and Ida Waugh, as well as the sculptors Lillian Baer, Sonia Gordon Brown, Malvina Hoffman, Anna Hyatt Huntington, Brenda Putnam, and Katharine Lane Weems, among others.

The collection includes important historic paintings from the late eighteenth and early nineteenth centuries by artists such as Thomas Birch, Jacob Eichholtz, Raphaelle Peale, Peter Rothermel, Gilbert Stuart, and Benjamin West. The Museum also holds strong examples of the Hudson River School, with works by Frederic Edwin Church, Jasper Francis Cropsey, Hermann Herzog, George Inness, Frederick Kensett, William Trost Richards, William Louis Sonntag, Paul Weber, and Worthington Whittredge, among others.

American Impressionism is a particular strength of the collection, represented by works by Cecilia Beaux, Frank Weston Benson, Emil Carlsen, William Merritt Chase, Childe Hassam, Charles Webster Hawthorne, Ernest Lawson, Frederick Mulhaupt, William McGregor Paxton, Jane Peterson, Robert Lewis Reid, John Singer Sargent, Abbott Handerson Thayer, John Henry Twachtman, Martha Walter, and Guy Wiggins. The collection also features substantial holdings from the impressionist-leaning New Hope School (Bucks County School), including works by John Folinsbee, Daniel Garber, William Langson Lathrop, Arthur Meltzer, Edward Willis Redfield, Paulette Van Roekens, Charles Rosen, Walter Elmer Schofield, George Sotter, and Robert Spencer.

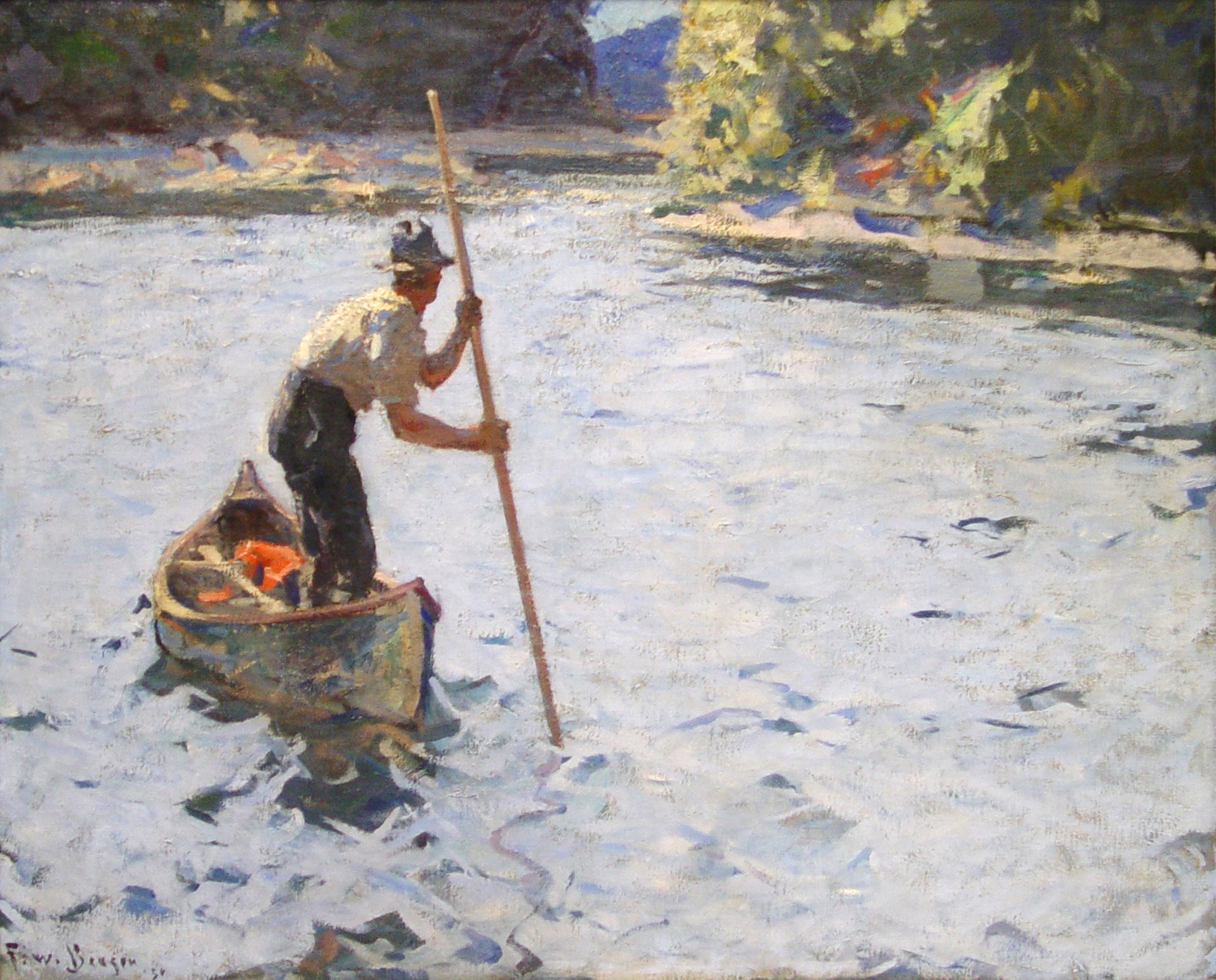
Frank Weston Benson (American, 1861–1951), On Grand River, 1930, oil on canvas, 36 x 44 inches, Reading Public Museum

American modernism is represented by members of the Ashcan School, including George Bellows, William Glackens, Robert Henri, George Luks, and John Sloan, whose work shaped the avant-garde scenes of Pennsylvania and New York. Additional modernist works include paintings by Arthur B. Davies, Werner Drewes, Leon Dabo, and Joseph Stella.

Among mid-century artists, the Museum holds one of the largest collections of works by William Baziotes in the United States. This extraordinary holding includes nearly 1,000 works—oils, watercolors, drawings, and approximately 900 sketches across 43 sketchbooks—by the artist, who was born in Pittsburgh and raised in Reading. The sculptor and designer Harry Bertoia is also well represented, with more than 50 works in the collection. Additional mid-century strengths include Abstract Expressionism and Color Field painting, with works by Friedel Dzubas, Helen Frankenthaler, Adolph Gottlieb, Hans Hofmann, Robert Motherwell, Jules Olitski, and Kenzo Okada.

The Museum also serves as the primary repository for works by historic Berks County artists. Notable holdings include more than 30 works by Christopher H. Shearer, over 25 by Ben Austrian, more than 15 by Augustus Adolphus Behne, and more than a dozen works by Francis Devlan.

=== European art ===
From its earliest years, the Reading Public Museum actively sought to build a distinguished collection of European art. These include a group of Old Masters with works by Domenico di Zanobi (Master of the Johnson Nativity), a very rare fresco by Domenico di Michelino, and a painting by the Spanish/Neapolitan artist Giovanni Dó. In addition there is a pair of sculptures attributed to a follower of Tilman Reimenschneider, a pair of coppers by Jan Brueghel the Younger, and compositions by Peter Lely, John Hayls, Joshua Reynolds, Simon de Vos, Jacomo Victors, and Pieter Wouwerman.

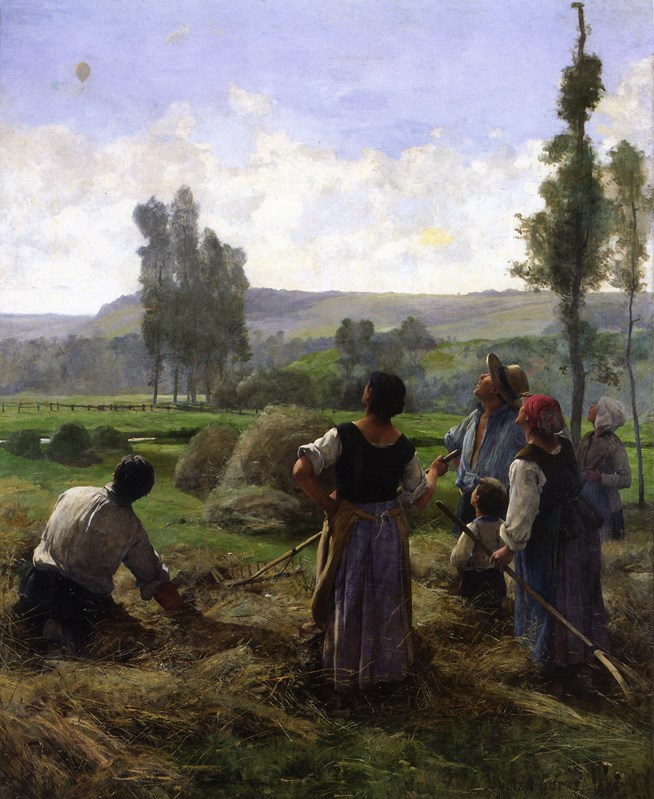
Julien Dupré (French, 1851–1910), The Balloon, 1886, oil on canvas, 95 1/4 x 79 inches, Reading Public Museum, Museum Purchase

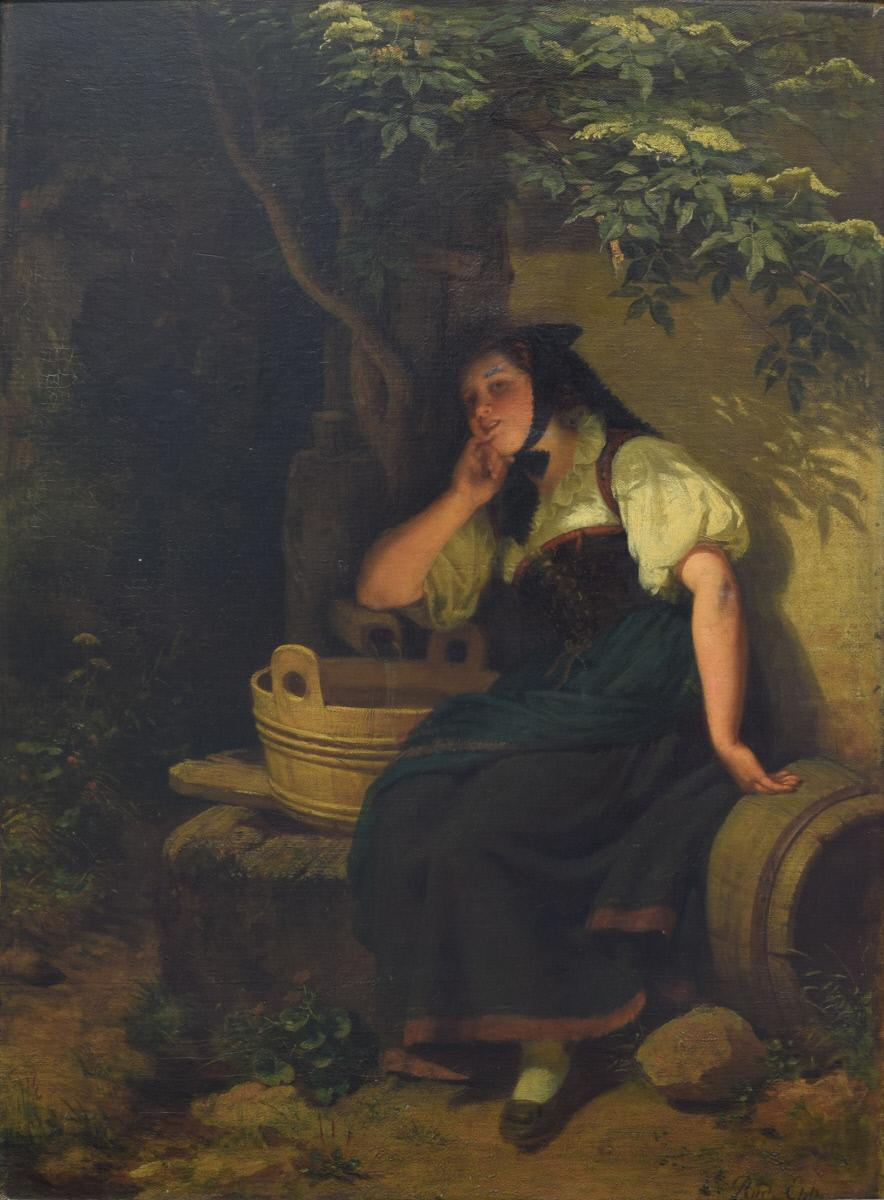
Rudolph Epp - painting - 1914.16.1 - Reading Public Museum

Early benefactors—including Henry Janssen, Ferdinand Thun, and Gustav Oberlaender—played a pivotal role in shaping the collection, securing important paintings by leading nineteenth-century artists associated with the Munich and Düsseldorf Schools, including Andreas Achenbach, Oswald Achenbach, Rudolf Epp, Adolf Schreyer, and Ferdinand Georg Waldmüller.

The Museum's holdings are particularly strong in nineteenth-century French painting, with notable examples by academic artists such as Julien Dupré and Léon Augustin Lhermitte, as well as members of the Barbizon School, including Charles-François Daubigny, Narcisse Virgilio Díaz de la Peña, and Théodore Rousseau.

French Impressionism is represented by three significant works by Edgar Degas, generously donated by members of the Henry K. Dick family, alongside paintings by Jean-Charles Cazin, Maximilien Luce, Albert Lebourg, Pierre-Auguste Renoir, and Victor Vignon. The collection also features outstanding examples of Spanish Realism by Marià Fortuny, Martín Rico y Ortega, Emilio Sánchez Perrier, and Raimundo de Madrazo y Garreta, as well as important works by other nineteenth century masters, including Eugène Cicéri, Hermann Corrodi, Hans Dahl, German Grobe, Frits Thaulow, and Anton Mauve.

=== Sculpture ===
The Museum holds an extensive collection of sculpture from around the world, including works from Asia, Africa, Europe and America. These include works by Auguste Rodin, Edward McCartan, Harriett Whitney Frishmuth, Cyrus Dallin, James Earl Fraser, Henry Moore, Harry Bertoia, George Segal, Nancy Graves, Frank Stella, and Deborah Butterfield. A selection of these works are rotated throughout the Museum on a regular basis, although Edward McCartan's "Drinking Girl" is out on permanent display in the Founders' Gallery.

=== Works on paper ===
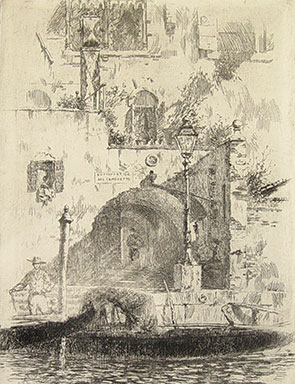
Sotto Portico del Traghetto by George Edward Hopkins, 1880

More than 12,000 works on paper are housed at the Museum, including etchings, woodblocks, watercolors drawings and photographs. The holdings include illuminated manuscripts, works by Albrecht Dürer, Rembrandt, Francisco Goya, James Abbott McNeill Whistler, through the prints of Andy Warhol, Jim Dine, Chuck Close, and Keith Haring. Photographs by Eadweard Muybridge, Edward Steichen, Alfred Stieglitz, Ansel Adams, Berenice Abbott, Harold Edgerton, Dorothea Lange, Barabara Morgan, and over two hundred works by Brett Weston are also represented.

The Reading Public Museum received a number of important works on paper from Edwin DeTurck Bechtel (1880–1957), a prominent New York City lawyer and native of Bechtelsville, Pennsylvania, a town founded by his ancestors. Bechtel earned his degrees from Harvard and developed a lifelong passion for art collecting and rose gardening.

Over the years, he maintained a close friendship with Levi W. Mengel, the founder and first director of the Reading Public Museum. This relationship resulted in the gift of nearly 80 works of art to the Museum, spanning the 1910s through the 1950s. Bechtel’s donations included etchings by Rembrandt, Francisco Goya, James McNeill Whistler, Joseph Pennell, Martin Lewis, and Rockwell Kent, along with Old Master drawings and bronze sculptures.

Bechtel also shared his extensive collection with other institutions. Among his gifts to the Metropolitan Museum of Art in New York were prints by Honoré Daumier, Jacques Callot, Hendrick Goltzius, and other pioneers of printmaking.

The collection of works on paper includes a significant group of medieval and early modern manuscript leaves acquired through Otto F. Ege (1888–1951), a Reading-born bookseller, manuscript specialist, and educator who later served as a professor of art history and dean of the Cleveland Institute of Art. Nearly all of the Museum’s illuminated manuscript pages entered the collection through Ege, primarily as gifts from his widow.

The holdings span the 13th through 17th centuries and include leaves from Flemish, French, Italian, Dutch, English, German, Armenian, and Persian manuscripts. Among the works are leaves from psalters, Books of Hours, missals, Bibles, lectionaries, breviaries, a Benedictional, an antiphonal, and literary texts including Epistles of Phalaris and Dialogues of Gregory the Great. Particularly notable examples include a Flemish or Northern French psalter of about 1300, an Italian Dominican Missal of about 1353, a Flemish Book of Hours dating to about 1480–1490, a French Bible Concordance of about 1240–1250, and an Italian leaf from the Comedies of Terence dating to 1475. The collection also encompasses non-Western manuscript traditions, including a Persian Qur'an leaf dating to about 1650 and a Persian leaf from the Shahnameh (Book of Kings) of 1625.

=== Ancient art ===
The Reading Public Museum’s ancient art collection is one of the most distinctive aspects of its cultural holdings. Spanning ancient Egypt, Greece, and Rome, it brings together objects that illuminate the religious beliefs, artistic achievements, burial practices, mythology, and everyday lives of civilizations across the ancient world. A particularly important figure in the development of this collection was Gustav Oberlaender (1867–1936), the Reading-area industrialist, philanthropist, and amateur archaeologist whose support for archaeological excavations in Greece and elsewhere helped bring ancient art to the region.

Gustav Oberlaender was part of the group of prominent Reading industrialists whose philanthropy helped establish the Reading Public Museum as a major cultural institution. Oberlaender's interests, however, extended well beyond local industry and civic development. He developed a serious interest in classical archaeology and supported excavations in the Mediterranean world. His archaeological patronage connected Reading with the scholarly networks of major American museums and universities, helping make ancient objects accessible to a regional public that might otherwise have encountered them only in much larger metropolitan institutions.

One particularly significant association was with the University of Pennsylvania Museum of Archaeology and Anthropology. Oberlaender became involved in 1930 through the excavations at Minturnae, an ancient Roman city in Italy. His initiative and financial assistance helped make that archaeological work possible. One of the Museum’s most important objects, a marble lekythos, a grave maker, from about the middle of the fourth century BCE was a gift of the Greek government to Oberlaender in 1933 as a token of thanks for his support of archaeological digs in the nation. The object was discovered in 1925 south of the Streets of Tombs, and belongs to the same funeral precinct as a large marble aedicula discovered there as early as 1861.

Nefrina is the centerpiece of the Museum's Ancient Civilizations Gallery. Her Ptolemaic-period mummy is accompanied by its original ornamented sarcophagus and cartonnage coverings—the decorated layers of material placed around the wrapped body. Together, these elements reveal the importance of preserving the body for the afterlife and the complex religious beliefs surrounding death and rebirth in ancient Egypt. Nefrina officially entered RPM’s collection in 1940, but she had already maintained a presence there since 1930.

The collection also includes more than a dozen important Greek vessels, among them hydrias, amphorae, kraters, and stamnoi. Their painted surfaces depict gods, heroes, and mythological narratives, while their forms reveal how pottery served practical functions at home, at communal drinking parties, and in religious and funerary settings. The Museum's celebrated Herakles vase is attributed to the Alkmene Painter. The collection includes geometric, black-figure, and red-figure examples, with some vessels dating as early as the eighth century BCE. Another vessel, an Attic Black-Figure Neck Amphora, is attributed to the Antimenes Painter and includes Athena, Herakles, and Hermes, entering the museum through Oberlaender’s estate. Additional works were purchased from Oberlaender’s estate in a 1939 sale at Parke-Bernet Galleries in New York. These include: a group of late-Geometric painted vessels (a tankard, a cup, and a lidded pyxis with two horses flanking the lid’s handle).

The Museum also holds Classical marble heads, ancient glassware, jewelry, and Greek and Roman objects of daily life. These smaller works expand the story beyond monumental sculpture and painted pottery, offering evidence of personal adornment, craftsmanship, and social identity in the ancient Mediterranean.

=== Arms and armor ===
The Arms and Armor gallery features exceptional European examples from the sixteenth and seventeenth centuries—including a Maximilian suit of armor—as well as examples from Japan, the Islamic world, Africa, and the South Pacific. Additional sculptures and paintings depicting the use of armor throughout history completes the holdings.

=== Native American ===
Hundreds of historic North American Indian artworks from the Lenape, Montagnais, Inuit, Blackfoot, Acoma, Hopi, Sioux, Crow, Cherokee, Cheyenne, Chippewa, Cochiti, and Mandan peoples are housed at The Reading Public Museum. These works are not generally on view, and are mainly accessible for examination and study by members of Native American tribal nations and other approved, academic researchers.

=== Asian art ===
Collecting Asian art was part of The Museum's practice from its earliest days. The Museum's collection of Asian artwork spans more than 2,500 years and includes a group of twelve Japanese temple guardian figures from the sixteenth century, a rare ritual jade cup with poetic inscription from the reign of Emperor Qianlong (1711-1799), a group of Tang and Han Dynasty tomb figures, a stunning standing Chinese bodhisattva Guanyin from the fourteenth century, a fine Japanese painting of Jizo Bosatsu on Lotus from the early fifteenth century, a bronze tripod ritual wine vessel (jue) from the twelfth century BCE, and a group of elaborately carved Chinese rhinoceros horn libation cups. Other key highlights include a Jain Svetambara Tirthankara in Meditation, a monumental carved ivory tusk with hundreds of figures from the workshop of Hoaching from the 1850s-60s, and a jade disc from the third century BCE. Japanese woodblock prints also form part of the holdings, as do other artworks from China, Japan, India, Tibet and Thailand.

=== Latin American art ===
Ancient and contemporary works originating from Central and South America form an important holding for the Museum, as these objects directly relate to the large Latin American population that has settled in the region. The holdings include precious objects, ceramics, sculptures, paintings and prints. Among the contemporary works are sculptures and paintings by Carlos Luna and Patrick McGrath Muniz.

=== Pennsylvania German ===
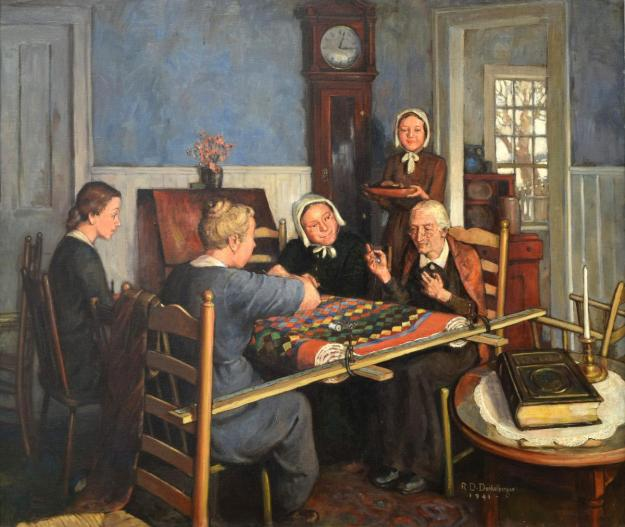
Ralph Daniel Dunkelberger - Quilting Party

The Museum houses a large collection of Pennsylvania German objects that relate primarily to Berks County and the surrounding region, and include numerous fraktur drawings and certificates, painted furniture, including one of the finest examples of a dower chest by the Black Unicorn Artist, glazed earthenware, clocks, tinware, and paintings

== Natural history collections ==
One of the Museum’s most significant holdings is the Levi W. Mengel entomological collection, comprising more than 1,500 drawers and approximately 152,000 insect specimens. Of these, more than 83,000 are Lepidoptera (butterflies and moths). The collection is international in scope, with specimens from more than 50 countries, including Greenland, Ecuador, India, Uganda, Tibet, Java, Italy, New Guinea, and the United States. Mengel, the Museum’s founding director, assembled much of the collection through specimens purchased from dealers and obtained through agents and field collectors, although he personally collected specimens in Greenland, Pennsylvania, New Jersey, and elsewhere.

Mengel’s entomological interests took him to some of the most remote regions accessible to scientists of his era. In 1891, he served as entomologist on Admiral Robert E. Peary’s expedition to West Greenland, where he collected specimens of the region’s distinctive insect fauna. The collection also includes Parnassius specimens from Siberia], acquired through an exchange with Grand Duke Nicholas of Russia. In 1912, Mengel suffered a substantial loss when a shipment of approximately 1,000 butterflies from a correspondent in India was aboard the Titanic when the ship sank. Mengel himself described and named one butterfly species, while another, Catagramma mengeli (Dillon), native to Peru, was named in his honor. He donated his extensive entomological collection to the Museum in 1927, and the collection was essentially complete by the time of his death in 1941.

Particularly important are approximately 150 type specimens within the Mengel collection. In zoological nomenclature, a ‘type specimen’ is the specimen or specimens upon which the formal description of a new species or subspecies is based, and which serve as a permanent reference for its identity. Such specimens have exceptional scientific and historical value because they provide researchers with an authoritative basis for identifying and comparing species.

Beetle’s also form an important portion of the entomological collection, numbering in the tens of thousands. The ornithological collections include approximately 11,000 North American bird skins, as well as several thousand bird nests and eggs. The mammal collection comprises roughly 3,000 specimens, including skins and taxidermy mounts, several of which are displayed in the Museum’s Natural History galleries.

The Museum’s paleontological holdings include the Herbein Collection of Fossils, a distinctive group of approximately 300 specimens donated to the Museum in 1933. Collected from the Mississippian-age Mauch Chunk Formation of Schuylkill County, Pennsylvania, the collection provides an important record of the region’s prehistoric past. The collection includes plant impressions, ripple marks, rain drop imprints, and vital early tetrapod (amphibian) tracks. In 2006, an especially rare fossil was discovered within the Museum’s holdings: a slab preserving three nearly complete ancient amphibians, dating to approximately 330 million years ago. The natural history collection also encompasses substantial geological holdings and a herbarium of preserved botanical specimens.

As a whole, the Reading Public Museum’s natural history collection contains specimens of exceptional rarity and, in some cases, examples not known to be held in any other collection in the world. Although selected specimens are periodically exhibited and rotated through the Museum’s galleries, the majority are preserved for scientific study and made available to qualified academic researchers. Together, these holdings constitute an important resource for the study of biodiversity, evolution, geology, and the natural history of Pennsylvania and the wider world.

== The Arboretum ==
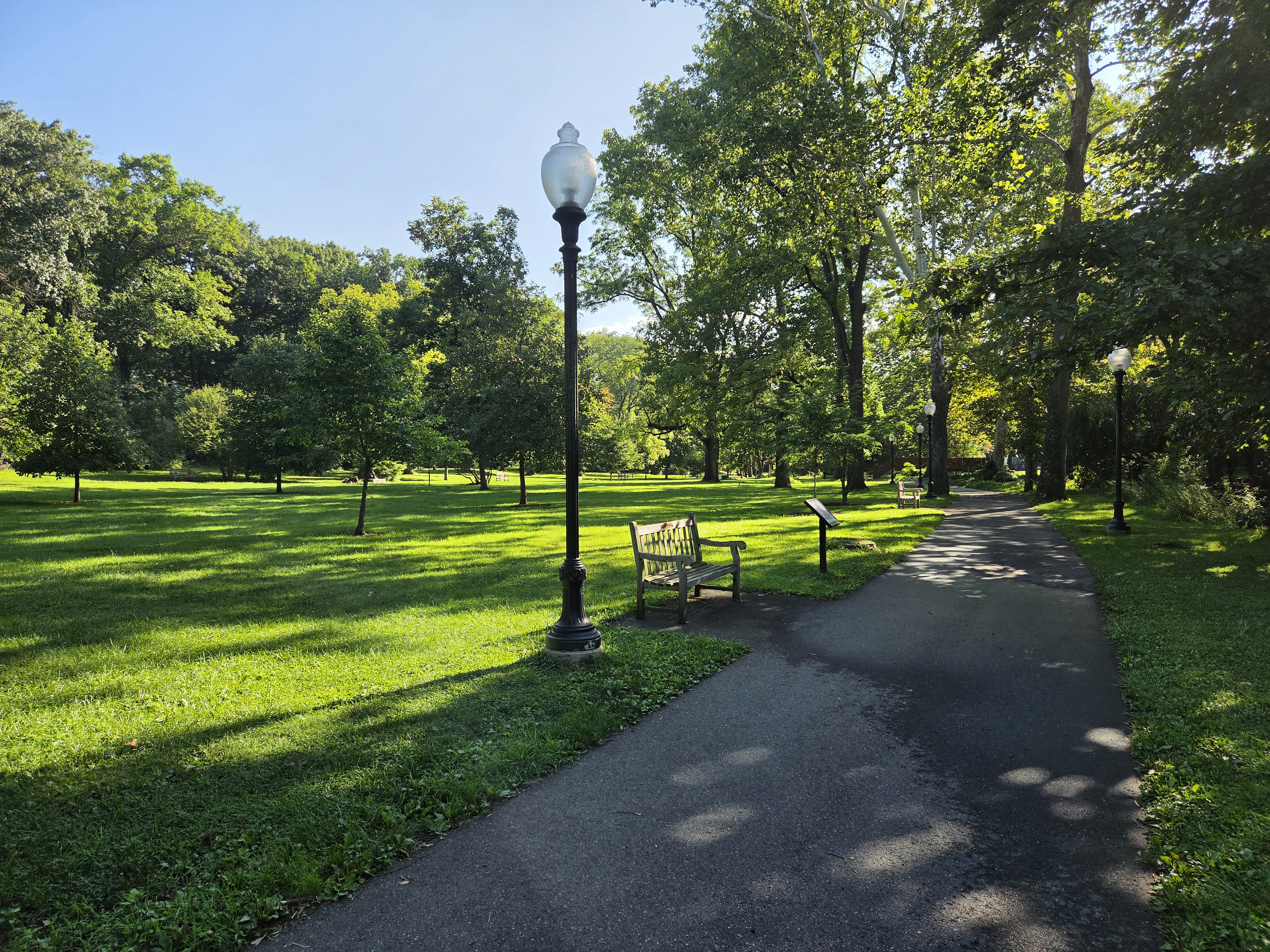
A walking trail in The Reading Public Museum's Arboretum.

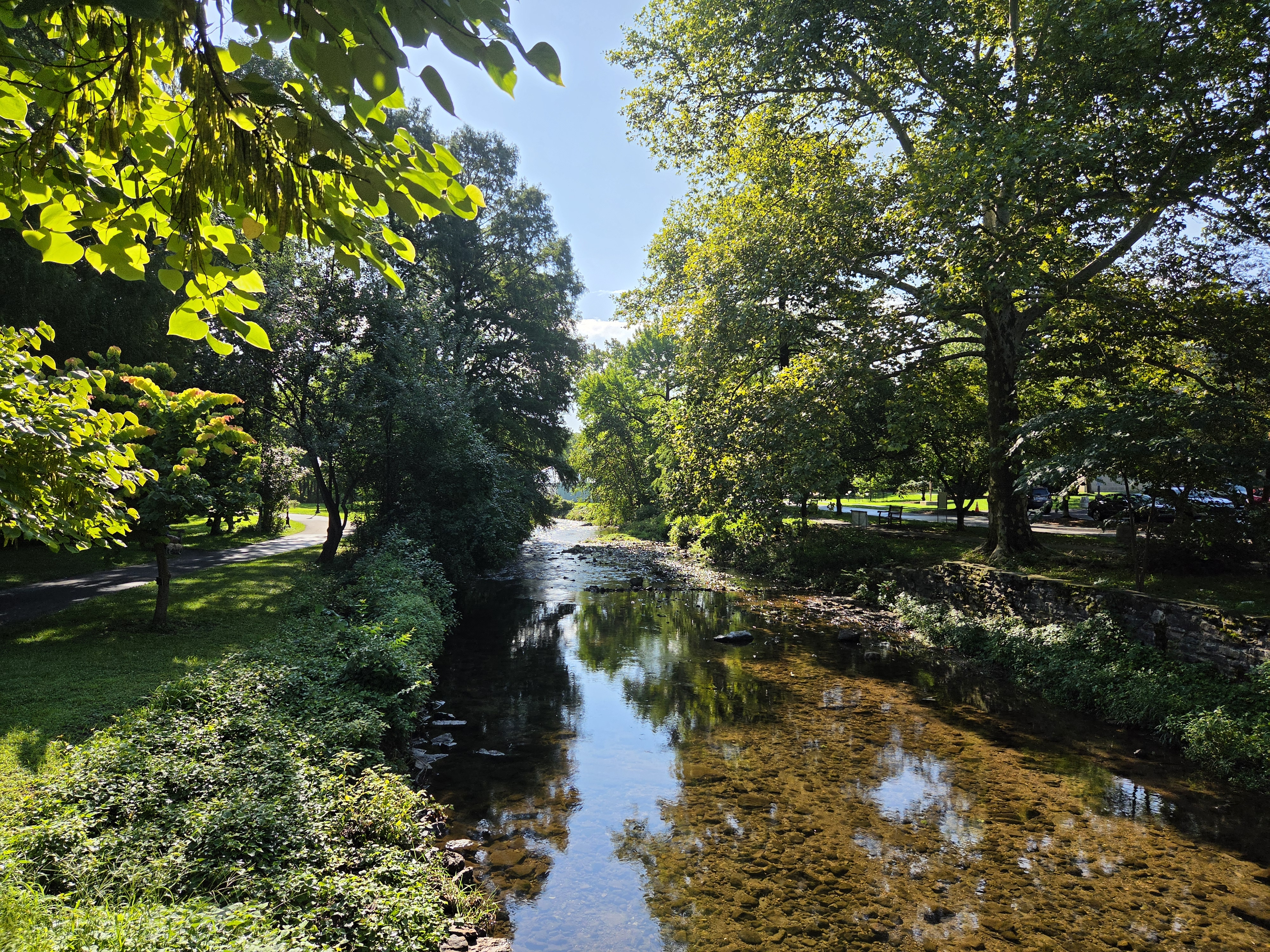
The Wyomissing Creek running through The Reading Public Museum's Arboretum.

In 1927, prominent Massachusetts-based landscape architect John Nolen issued a plan for the Wyomissing Development Company that included a generalized plan for The Museum’s Arboretum, as well as a plan for the residential Wyomissing Park. Nolen was a landscape adviser to The Museum, and Elmer A. Muhs was named as The Arboretum’s landscape architect. Many specimens were donated or obtained by pioneer nurseryman Bertrand Farr from his superb botanical collection of trees, shrubs, and flowering plants, gathered from all over the world, and from the Arnold Arboretum of Harvard University. The Arboretum soon gained recognition as an accredited station for the all-important United States Bureau of Plant Industry.

During the construction of the landscaping of the arboretum, Mirror Lake was created with the installation of a dam to capture water and create a pond. A second dam was added years later along with a straightening of the creek. Coupled with the further development of the surrounding area, The Museum grounds started to experience rapid runoff of surface water and a build-up of sediment at the dams – this required serious dredging approximately every five years. Between the sediment build-up and an overabundance of visitors feeding ducks and Canadian Geese, outbreaks of botulism occurred in the late 1960s and again in the late 1980s-early 1990s. Proposals for the removal of the dams began in 1997, but it was not until 2002 that the Wyomissing Creek Restoration Project was instituted to remove them, plant riparian stabilizers, and allow the creek to return to a natural path.

In 2001, The Museum formed an Arboretum Committee to catalog and evaluate the valuable horticultural specimens on the grounds. Dismayed by the decline of the once outstanding collection, the committee developed a proposal for the restoration and preservation of the horticultural treasures. The Master Gardeners of Berks County were approached as potential partners and the Arboretum Assistants Program was initiated in the spring of 2002. Modeled after a program at Scott Arboretum on the Swarthmore College campus, The Museum continues to recruit community volunteers to work on The Museum grounds under the supervision of an Arboretum Manager and a representative of the Penn State Master Gardeners Program. This program partnership is still going strong today.

The greenhouse and annex building that form part of the site were planned for and constructed between 1940 and 1960 to aid in the propagation of plants for the grounds and storage for the related natural history collections. Originally, the grounds were kept in order by a dedicated team of 4-5 school district employees, but by the 1980s funding became tight and the grounds and greenhouse began to deteriorate. In 2010, the refurbishment of the greenhouse began, and it was brought up to its current state with additional needed updates followed by a formal ribbon cutting in 2013.

Highlights of The Arboretum include an Artemis I Moon Tree, a descendent of the William Penn Treaty Elm, several Pennsylvania Champion Trees, Trudy’s Garden, the Robert W. Ciferri Sensory Garden, and The Friendship Garden, which is maintained by the Garden Club of Reading. The property features both native and specimen plants and trees, and portions of the creek are native trout breeding grounds.

== The Neag Planetarium ==
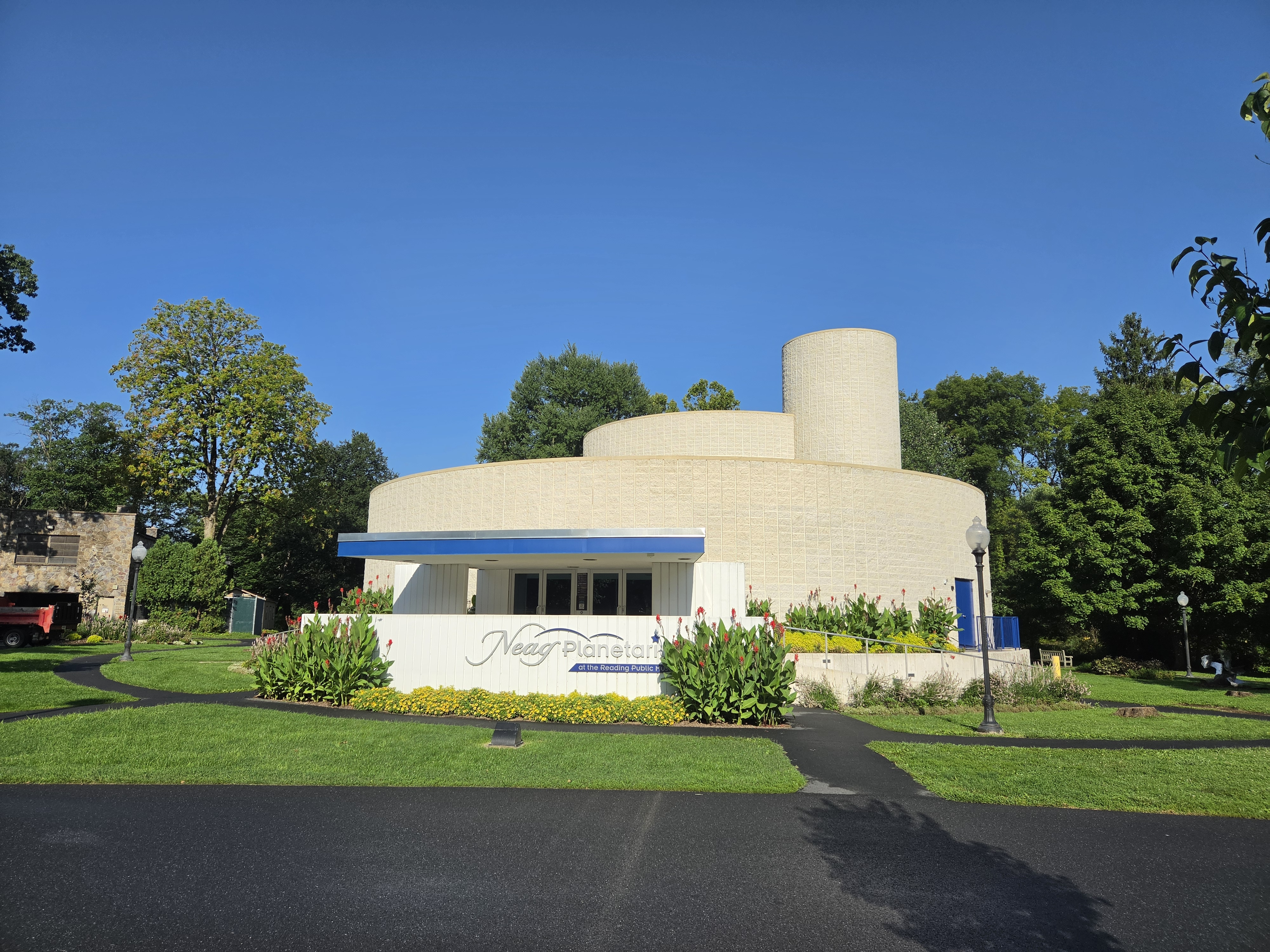
The Neag Planetarium in August, 2026.

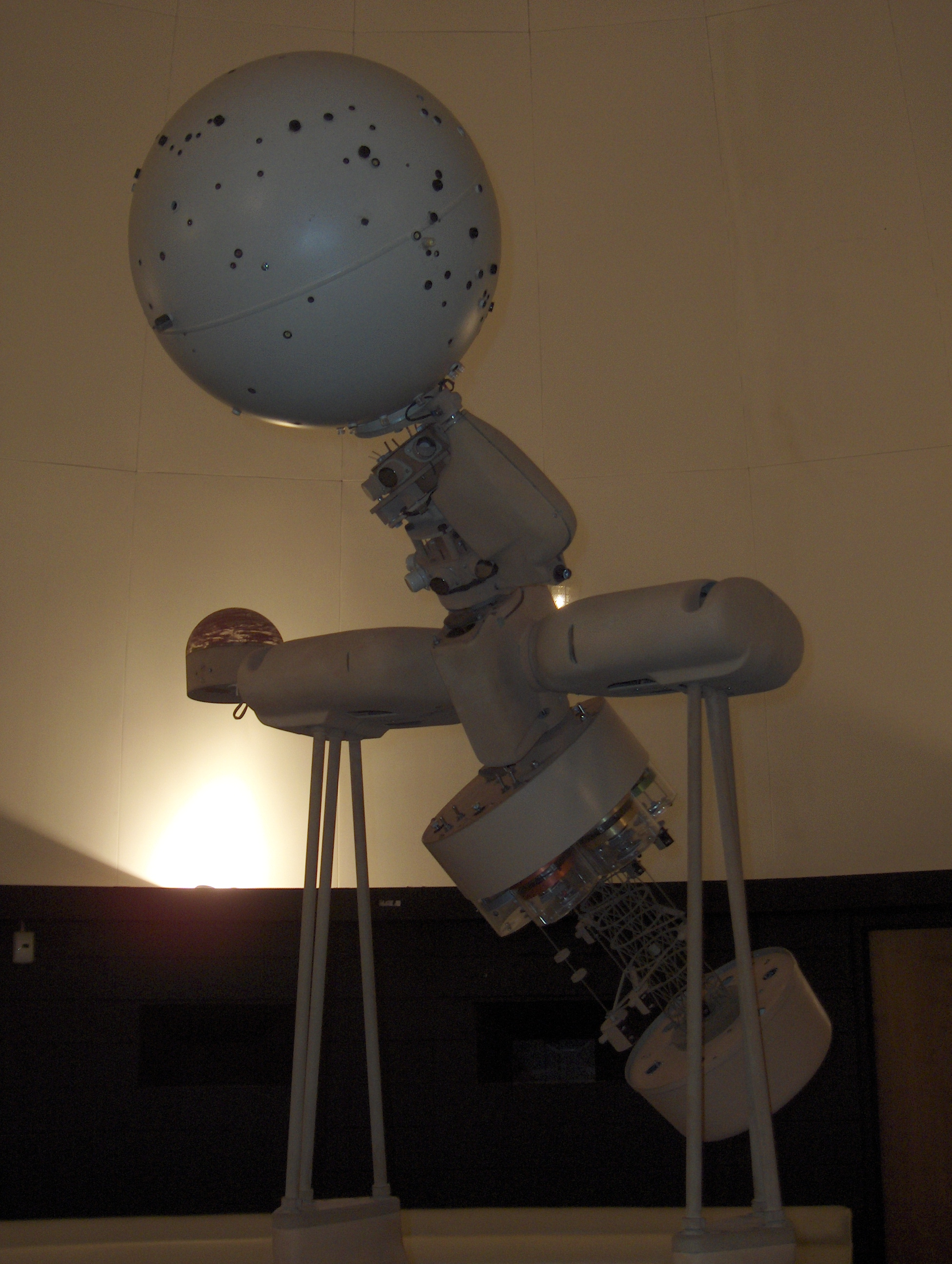
The first Neag Planetarium projector, a Spitz A4 optical/mechanical projector.

The idea for a planetarium in Reading can be traced back to the early 1950’s. Sometime during the early part of 1952, a proposal was floated for a Planetarium to be built inside the Museum’s art galleries, but space was inadequate, so the idea was abandoned. The dream continued into the early 1960’s, but this time with the hopes of securing a separate facility on the grounds where the planetarium could be located. The only obstacle was funding.

That changed when in the spring of 1963 the Berks County Women’s Club came to the aid of the Museum and began a campaign to raise funds for the new facility. Their fundraising efforts were eventually combined with a five-year loan, federal funds, and private contributions, and by 1967, the idea became a possibility rather than just a dream.

Designs were developed and finalized, construction crews from Burkey Construction were assembled, and by December ground was broken. Construction continued for the next year and by December 15, 1968, the planetarium was opened and placed into operation. To the enthusiastic delight of local children, the first public shows began in January of 1969. The planetarium’s total construction costs came in at $70,522.

From 1968 through 2006, the Planetarium’s star projector was a Spitz A4 optical/mechanical projector, along with dozens of slide and special effects projectors. In early 2006, local philanthropists Ray and Carole Neag bestowed on the planetarium a generous gift to finance upgrades in order to transition into one of the country’s first digital projection systems. Because of this gift, the facility was renamed “The Neag Planetarium at the Reading Public Museum.”

In mid-2017, the Museum secured funding from the Wyncote Foundation in Philadelphia, whose mission is “to support efforts that strengthen and enrich culture, community and the natural environment,” to upgrade the existing 2006 digital technologies for the Neag Planetarium. The new system is a SCIDome IQ 4K Laser Projection System and it was installed by Spitz Incorporated based out of Chadds Ford, Pennsylvania.

The current system is unique in that it uses two digital projectors instead of one. These two projectors are installed out of the viewer’s line of sight on opposite sides of the dome, allowing the creation of one large image. The lack of a projector located in the center of the planetarium chamber makes for a much more streamlined seating arrangement, opening up the space for much more creative use during special events and rentals.

== See also ==
- List of botanical gardens in the United States
