= Paulette Van Roekens =

American painter

- Born: December 31, 1895; Château-Thierry, France
- Died: January 11, 1988 (aged 92); Huntingdon Valley, Pennsylvania
- Education: Philadelphia School of Design for Women; Pennsylvania Academy of the Fine Arts
- Known for: Landscapes, cityscapes, an art instructor for 41 years
- Notable work: Treat 'Em Rough; Girard Trust Building: Third Liberty Loan; Towers in the Mist; Midsummer Dreams
- Movement: Pennsylvania Impressionism
- Spouse: Arthur Meltzer

Paulette Van Roekens was a Belgian-American painter and educator, who lived most of her life in the Philadelphia area. She had a long career as an artist, and is considered one of the Pennsylvania Impressionists.

== Early life and education ==
She was born on New Year's Eve 1895, in a farmhouse outside of Château-Thierry, France. Her Belgian parents, Victor and Jeanne van Roekens, emigrated to the United States when she was an infant. The family settled just outside Philadelphia, in Glenside, Pennsylvania, where her father operated a tree farm and nursery.

Van Roekens enrolled in the Philadelphia School of Design for Women (now Moore College of Art and Design) in 1915, intending to study sculpture. At the end of her first year she was awarded the 1916 John Sartain Fellowship.

Following the sinking of three American merchant ships, the United States declared war on Germany in April 1917. With the Pennsylvania Academy of Fine Arts's male students enlisting or being drafted, Van Roekens was able to attend classes at PAFA, 1917-18. She also led a student effort to knit socks and sweaters for Americans being shipped overseas.

While a student, she was invited to participate in PAFA's 116th Annual Exhibition (January 1918), showing City Hall and The New Boulevard. Among her teachers were Samuel Murray, Henry B. Snell, Leopold Seyffert, Joseph Thurman Pearson Jr., and Charles Grafly.

== Career ==
Van Roekens's first teaching job was at the Graphic Sketch Club in South Philadelphia, 1920 – 1927. "Unlike other institutions and museums at the time, the Graphic Sketch Club was open in the evening, with working people in mind. Classes were offered to people of all ages in mediums ranging from drawing and painting to sculpture ..."

In 1923, Van Roekens was hired as an assistant professor of drawing and painting at her alma mater, the Philadelphia School of Design for Women, a position she held for thirty-seven years. The school was renamed the Moore College of Art and Design in the late 1950s, and presented her with an honorary doctorate upon her retirement in 1961.

Van Roekens worked in a variety of media and was well known for her oils and pastels. Still lifes were prominent in her early work, but as her career developed she turned more and more to landscapes. She called herself a “sometimes impressionist,” because while she was strongly influenced by impressionism she found it difficult to completely break with academic drawing.

She exhibited throughout her career, with fourteen solo exhibitions (her first was in 1920 at age 24), and two joint retrospective exhibitions with her husband. Her final solo exhibition was mounted by the Woodmere Art Gallery in 1987, only a few months prior to her death on January 11, 1988.

Van Roekens's work is represented at the Pennsylvania Academy of the Fine Arts, the Corcoran Gallery of Art, the National Academy of Design, the Carnegie Institute, the Art Institute of Chicago, the Mint Museum (Charlotte, N.C.), the Albright-Knox Art Gallery, and the Detroit Institute of Art. She was a member of the Art Alliance of America, and the National Association of Women Painters and Sculptors.

== Selected works ==
=== Cityscapes ===
- The New Boulevard, oil on canvas, c.1917, Palmer Museum of Art, Pennsylvania State University, State College, Pennsylvania
  - 116th Annual Exhibition of the Pennsylvania Academy of the Fine Arts (January 1918), no. 13
  - "Paulette Van Roekiens has a bit of interesting direct handling in a little canvas of The New Boulevard, as the Parkway is now called."
- Treat 'Em Rough, oil on canvas, 1918, Pennsylvania Academy of the Fine Arts, Philadelphia, Pennsylvania. Acquired by PAFA, 1919.
  - 117th Annual Exhibition of the Pennsylvania Academy of the Fine Arts (January 1919), no. 70
- Victory Loan on Chestnut Street, oil on canvas, 1918, private collection
  - "Paulette Van Roekens has two paintings in the summer exhibition at the Corcoran Gallery in Washington, including Victory, a colorful view of the corner of Broad and Chestnut streets during the Victory Loan drive, a painting which won much favorable comment here during Artists' Week."
- Girard Trust Building: Third Liberty Loan, oil on canvas, 1919, private collection
  - Auctioned at Freeman's | Hindman, 29 April 2018, Lot 35. Realized $46,875, an auction record for a painting by Van Roekens.
- Calico Row, Newport, Rhode Island, oil on canvas, 1920, private collection
  - Annual Exhibition of the National Academy of Design, 1922, no. 15
  - Twenty-Ninth Annual Exhibition of American Art, Cincinnati Museum, 1922, no. 120.
  - Auctioned at Rago, 10 November 2018, Lot 135
- 15th Street from Broad Street Station, oil on canvas, c.1920, Philadelphia Sketch Club
- Independence Hall, Philadelphia, oil on canvas, c.1923
  - First Honorable Mention, 1923 Annual Exhibition of the National Association of Women Painters and Sculptors, Fine Arts Building, New York City.
  - 122nd Annual Exhibition of the Pennsylvania Academy of the Fine Arts (January 1924), no. 5
  - First Pan-American Exhibition of Oil Paintings, November 27, 1925 - February 28, 1926, Los Angeles Museum, no. 117.
  - Auctioned at Freeman's | Hindman, 3 December 2023, Lot 85, Unsold.
- Towers in the Mist, oil on canvas, 1925, Reading Public Museum, Reading, Pennsylvania
  - 125th Annual Exhibition of the Pennsylvania Academy of the Fine Arts (January 1927), no. 192
- City Hall Towers, oil on canvas, 1928, private collection
- Gray Towers

=== Landscapes and outdoor scenes ===
- On the Beach at Bass Rocks, oil on canvas, c.1920
  - 1921 Fellowship of the Academy of Fine Arts Exhibition, Philadelphia. "[A]n admirable bit of direct painting, true in notation of sunlight on figures and sand ..."
- Gray Day in Newport, Rhode Island, oil on canvas, n.d.
  - Twenty-First Annual International Exhibition of Paintings, 1922, Carnegie Museum of Art, Pittsburgh, Pennsylvania, no. 154
- Floating Logs, oil on canvas, c.1922
  - Exhibited at the 1923 Philadelphia Art Alliance Exhibition at the Academy of Music
  - Auctioned at Rago, 10 November 2022, Lot 204
- At the Horse Show, oil on canvas, 1923, private collection
  - 117th Annual Exhibition, Pennsylvania Academy of the Fine Arts, 1923, no. 432
- The Carousel, oil on canvas, c.1938
  - Auctioned at Freeman's | Hindman, 8 December 2019, Lot 113
- The Horse with the Lavender Eye, oil on canvas, 1939, James A. Michener Art Museum, Doylestown, Pennsylvania
- Midsummer Dreams, oil on canvas, n.d., private collection
  - 124th Annual Exhibition, Pennsylvania Academy of the Fine Arts, 1939, no. 122
- Sawdust and Spangles, oil on canvas, n.d., Woodmere Art Museum, Chestnut Hill, Philadelphia, Pennsylvania
- Holiday on the Beach, oil on canvas, n.d.
- Cape May Beach, oil on canvas, n.d.

=== Ballet, opera, theater, circus ===
In 1951, the Sadler Wells Theatre Ballet of London began a year-long tour of the United States, which included a month performing at Philadelphia's Academy of Music. Van Roekens obtained permission to sketch the troupe during rehearsals, which resulted in a series of ballet paintings:

- Dress Rehearsal (Sadler Wells)
- Red Curtains
- Light and Shadow
- Harlequinn Ladies
- The Music Room
- White Ballet
- Entering the Ballet
- The Swan Ballet

She later obtained similar permission to sketch opera productions, theater productions, and other ballet troupes. “Paulette Van Roekens enjoys painting still life and in oils, but her favorites are the ballet and the circus.”

- Royal Danish Ballet, oil on canvas, 1978
- Under the Spotlight, n.d.

=== Still lifes ===
- Poppies and Old China, oil on canvas, c.1920
  - Exhibited at National Academy of Design, 1921, no. 142
- Satsuma Rose Jar and Lilies, oil on canvas, n.d.
  - Exhibited at the City Art Museum of St. Louis, 1921
  - 118th Annual Exhibition of the Pennsylvania Academy of the Fine Arts, 1923, no. 48
  - Ninth Exhibition of Oil Paintings, 1923, Corcoran Gallery of Art, Washington, D.C., no. 289
  - Seventh Annual Exhibition, 1923, Concord [Massachusetts] Art Association, no. 40
  - Eighteenth Annual Exhibition, Albright-Knox Art Gallery, 1924, Buffalo, NY. Catalogue, p. 58
- Arrangement with Citron, oil on canvas, 1936, Woodmere Art Museum, Chestnut Hill, Philadelphia, Pennsylvania
  - 132nd Annual Exhibition of the Pennsylvania Academy of the Fine Arts, 1937, no. 121

=== Other subjects ===
- Crystal Bar, Virginia City, Nevada, oil on canvas, 1946, ex coll. Gratz Gallery
  - 142nd Annual Exhibition of the Pennsylvania Academy of the Fine Arts, 1947, no. 615

== Awards and honors ==
- Gold medal, Plastic Club, 1920 – for
- Gold medal, Philadelphia Sketch Club, 1922 – for Treat 'Em Rough
- First Honorable Mention, National Association of Women Painters and Sculptors, 33rd Annual Exhibition, New York City, October 1923 – for Independence Hall
- Fellowship of the Pennsylvania Academy of the Fine Arts Prize, 1928 – for
- Exhibition prize, Woodmere Art Gallery, 1946 – for
- Exhibition prize, Woodmere Art Gallery, 1956 – for
- Mary T. Mason Prize, Woodmere Art Gallery, 1965 – for

- Joint exhibition (with husband, Arthur Meltzer), Woodmere Art Gallery, 1944
- Solo exhibition, McClees Gallery, Bryn Mawr, Pennsylvania, 1946
- Honorary doctorate, Moore College of Art and Design, 1961
- Lifetime retrospective exhibition, Woodmere Art Gallery, 1966
- Joint exhibition (with Elizabeth S. Conseur), Hazelton (Pennsylvania) Art League, September 1969
- Joint exhibition (with husband, Arthur Meltzer), Allentown Art Museum, October 5 – November 14, 1980
- Solo exhibition, Woodmere Art Gallery, 1987

== Personal ==
Van Roekens married Arthur Meltzer (1893 – 1989) in 1927, a fellow faculty member at the Philadelphia School of Design for Women and a respected artist in his own right. The following year, they bought and restored a farmhouse in Trevose, Pennsylvania, where they raised their two children. "They also served as the model of a modern couple: van Roekens used her maiden name professionally, and they taught on separate days so they could share childrearing duties."

In 1949, Meltzer and Van Roekens were notified that their property would be condemned to build an extension of the Pennsylvania Turnpike. They salvaged doors, windows, mantels and other architectural elements prior to the farmhouse's demolition. Architect John Bower incorporated these into the Colonial Revival house he designed for them at 1521 Old Welsh Road in Abington Township, Montgomery County, Pennsylvania. The new house was one-and-a-half-stories, faced with fieldstone, and featured twin artist's studios in an outbuilding they named "Northlight."

The new house was located about a mile from the fairgrounds of the June Fête—an annual carnival, midway, horse show, art show and auction—organized as a fund-raiser for nearby Abington Hospital. The tents of the June Fête appear in many of Van Roekens's carnival paintings.

Van Roekens and Meltzer painted mostly local scenes, but there were occasional subjects in New York City, New England and Nevada, and foreign scenes painted during trips to Europe. They would also spend part of their summers painting in Mystic, Connecticut.

=== Children ===
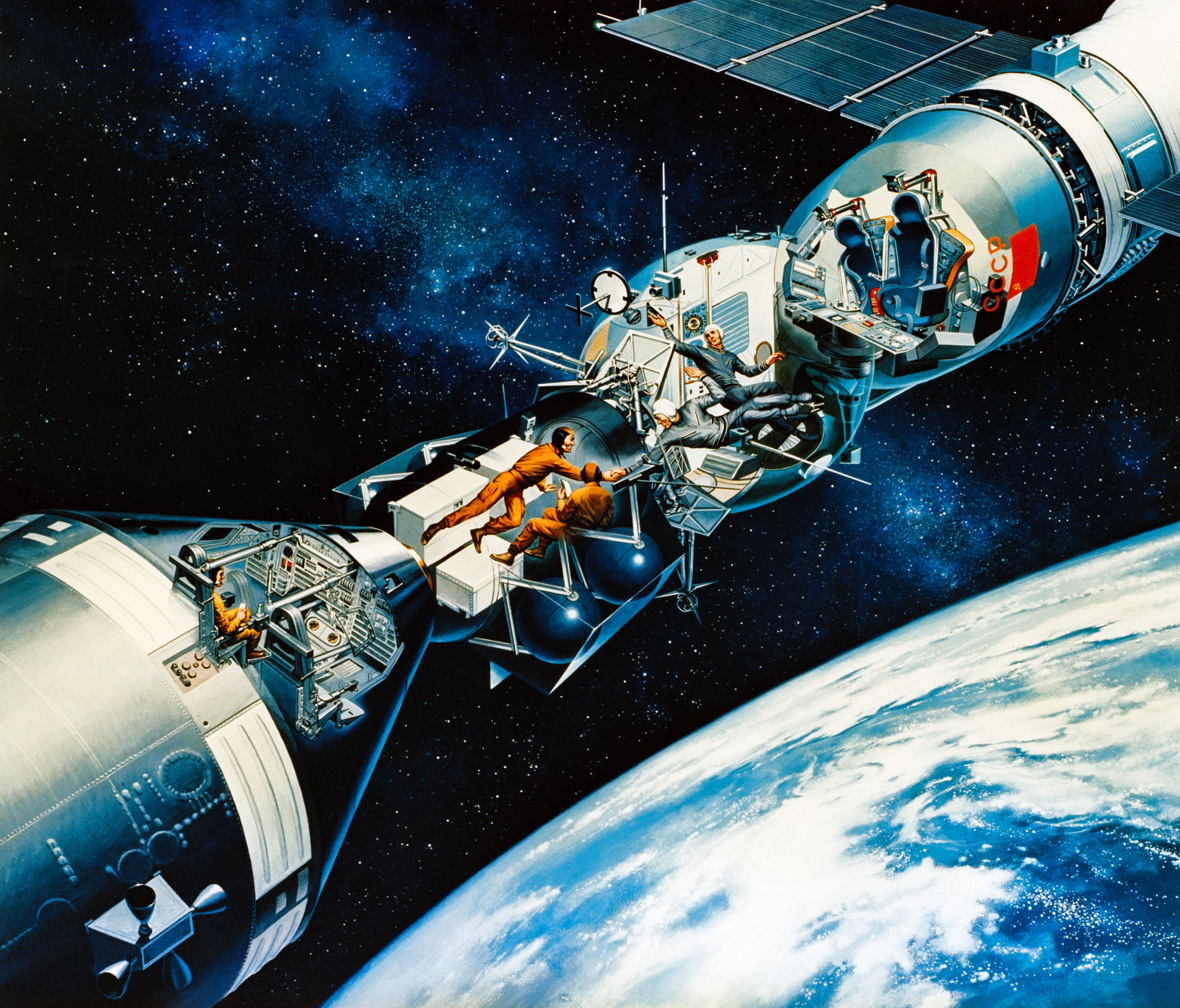
Apollo-Soyuz Test Project (April 1975), illustration for NASA by Davis Paul Meltzer.

Son, Davis Paul Meltzer (1930 – 2017), became a freelance artist, who created stamps for the U.S. Postal Service, painted dozens of book covers, illustrated space flight for NASA, and worked as a scientific illustrator at National Geographic Magazine for 30 years. He married Ilse Aguirre, and they lived in Huntingdon Valley, Pennsylvania.

Daughter, Joanne Fleure Meltzer Craul (1932 – 1999), graduated from the University of Pennsylvania School of Nursing, and became a professor of nursing at the SUNY Upstate Medical Center, in Syracuse, New York. She married Dr. Phillip J. Craul, and they had a son and a daughter.
