= Arthur Meltzer =

American painter (1893–1989)

- Born: July 31, 1893; Minneapolis, Minnesota
- Died: July 3, 1989 (aged 95); Huntingdon Valley, Pennsylvania
- Education: Minneapolis School of Fine Arts; Pennsylvania Academy of the Fine Arts
- Known for: Landscapes, portraits, still lifes
- Notable work: Pennsylvania Dutch Sunday; Trapper's Trail; By These Indentures; Quarry at Edge Hill
- Movement: Pennsylvania Impressionism
- Spouse: Paulette Van Roekens

Arthur Meltzer (1893, Minneapolis, Minnesota – 1989, Abington Township, Montgomery County, Pennsylvania) was a 20th-century American painter and teacher. He painted landscapes, portraits and still lifes, and was part of "the last generation of Pennsylvania Impressionists."

Meltzer attended the Pennsylvania Academy of the Fine Arts in Philadelphia, and taught for twenty-four years at the Philadelphia School of Design for Women (now Moore College of Art and Design). There he met his future wife, Paulette Van Roekens, who was also an instructor at the school.

The auction record for an Arthur Meltzer painting was set in 2010, when The Robe of Winter sold for $156,875 (including buyer's premium).

== Education ==
Meltzer was the only child of Lithuanian Jewish immigrants Louis E. and Cecelia Fineberg Meltzer, who came to the United States about 1890, and settled in Minneapolis, Minnesota. The son attended public schools and a vocational high school, but supplemented his education with Saturday art classes at the Minneapolis School of Fine Arts, taught by German-born American painter Robert Koehler.

Meltzer worked as an apprentice for six years at the Ford and Nutt Stained Glass Company in Minneapolis. With the April 1917 entry of the United States into World War I, he enlisted in the U.S. Army, serving for two years in M Company, 36th Infantry Regiment, 12th Division.

Following his military service, Meltzer enrolled in the school of the Pennsylvania Academy of the Fine Arts in Philadelphia. His teachers at PAFA included Daniel Garber, Joseph Thurman Pearson Jr. and Robert Vonnoh. At the end of his second year, PAFA awarded Meltzer a Cresson Travelling Scholarship, which enabled him to spend the summer of 1921 touring England, France, Italy, Spain and The Netherlands.

Meltzer completed his third year at PAFA, but was living in Berks County, Pennsylvania by December 1922. There he began a years-long series of landscape paintings featuring Pennsylvania-German farms, houses and churches. Although no longer enrolled as a full-time student, Meltzer was permitted to show his work in PAFA's Annual Student Exhibitions, held at the end of each Spring semester.

== Teaching career ==
Harriet Sartain, dean of the Philadelphia School of Design for Women, was an admirer of Meltzer's painting. She reached out to him about joining the faculty at her school, which he did in Fall 1924. Meltzer met his future wife at the school, Paulette Van Roekens, who had joined the faculty a year earlier. In 1926, he became head of the school's Fine Arts Department.

Meltzer taught at the Philadelphia School of Design for Women for twenty-four years, leaving in 1949 to concentrate on other work. Van Roekens continued to teach at the school until her retirement in 1961.

== Selected works ==
=== Landscapes ===
- Approach of Autumn (1924, oil on canvas), private collection
- The Robe of Winter (1924, oil on canvas), Ex collection: Columbus Museum of Art, Columbus, Ohio
  - The Robe of Winter was deaccessioned by the Columbus Museum of Art and sold at Garth's Auctions in Ohio on January 30, 2010, as lot 202. It realized $156,875.
- Summer Skies (1924, oil on canvas), James A. Michener Art Museum, Doylestown, Pennsylvania
- Out of the Way Places (c.1926, oil on board), Payne Gallery, Moravian College, Bethlehem, Pennsylvania. Purchased 1990.
- "Pequotsepos" (Denison Homestead, built 1717), (oil on canvas, 1927), Mystic Museum of Art, Mystic, Connecticut
- Pennsylvania Dutch Sunday (1929, oil on canvas), private collection
- Trapper's Trail (c.1936, oil on canvas), Pennsylvania Academy of the Fine Arts, Philadelphia, Pennsylvania
- Harvest Winds (1943, oil on canvas), Reading Public Museum, Reading, Pennsylvania
- Woods and Hillsides (1944, oil on canvas), Bucks County Fine Art Collection, Doylestown, Pennsylvania
- Quarry at Edge Hill (1945, oil on canvas), private collection.
- Silver Springs, Nevada (c.1946, oil on board), private collection
- Paper Mill Road (n.d., oil on board), James A. Michener Art Museum, Doylestown, Pennsylvania
- Over to Lambertville (n.d., oil on canvas), Woodmere Art Museum, Chestnut Hill, Philadelphia, Pennsylvania

=== Portraits ===
- Posthumous Portrait of James Mapes Dodge, American Mechanical Engineer (1941, oil on canvas), private collection.
  - Note: Thomas Eakins painted portraits of Josephine Kern Dodge (1896, Goodrich #293), son Kern Dodge (c.1902, Goodrich #368), and daughter-in-law Helen Peterson Dodge (1904, Goodrich #398).
- Self-Portrait (n.d., oil on canvas), James A. Michener Art Museum, Doylestown, Pennsylvania

=== Still lifes ===
- By These Indentures (c.1940, oil on canvas), Woodmere Art Museum, Chestnut Hill, Philadelphia, Pennsylvania

== Exhibitions and honors ==
[[File:Moore College of Art & Design (53574634695).jpg|thumb|left|Moore College of Art and Design, Philadelphia]]

Between 1922 and 1946, Meltzer showed almost every year in PAFA's annual exhibitions. He was never awarded a prize, but the 1931, 1934 and 1937 catalogues each were illustrated with a painting by him.

Meltzer exhibited semi-regularly at the National Academy of Design's annual exhibitions between 1923 and 1937. He was never awarded a prize, but the 1926 catalogue was illustrated with a painting by him.

In 1925, he was invited to participate in the Twentieth Annual Exhibition of Paintings by American Artists at the City Art Museum in St. Louis, Missouri.

PAFA awarded Meltzer its 1925 Fellowship Prize, for the best student work shown in the Annual Student Exhibition. The winner was selected by members of the Fellowship of the Pennsylvania Academy of the Fine Arts, an association of PAFA alumni. Three years later, PAFA awarded Paulette Van Roekens the 1928 Fellowship Prize.

He was an occasional participant in the annual exhibitions of the Art Institute of Chicago and the Toledo Museum of Art, along with the biennial exhibitions of the Corcoran Gallery of Art. Locally, he exhibited with the Philadelphia Art Alliance, the Philadelphia Sketch Club (honorable mentions, 1924, 1925, 1926, 1927), the Woodmere Art Gallery (prizes, 1949, 1951, 1967, 1969, 1971), the Chester County Art Association in West Chester, and the Phillips' Mill Art Association in New Hope (prizes, 1963, 1975).

- Joint exhibition (with Carl Lawless), Columbus Gallery of Fine Arts, Columbus, Ohio, December 1926.
- Solo exhibition, MacBeth Gallery, New York, New York, 1929
- Solo exhibition, Young Gallery, Chicago, Illinois, c. 1935
- Joint exhibition (with wife, Paulette Van Roekens), Woodmere Art Gallery, Philadelphia, Pennsylvania, 1944
- Solo exhibition, Crest Galleries, Bucks County, Pennsylvania, 1958
- Solo exhibition, Scofield Gallery, Doylestown, Pennsylvania, 1960
- Solo exhibition, Woodmere Art Gallery, Philadelphia, Pennsylvania, 1970
- Joint exhibition (with Ben Solowey), Solowey Studio, Bedminster, Pennsylvania, 1970s
- Joint exhibition (with wife, Paulette Van Roekens), Allentown Art Museum, October 5 – November 14, 1980
- Posthumous Joint exhibition (with Ben Solowey, both artists deceased), Solowey Studio, Bedminster, Pennsylvania, October 11 to November 15, 1998

At Moore College of Art's 1983 graduation, the school honored Meltzer by bestowing on him the title of "Professor Emeritus."

== Personal life ==
Arthur Meltzer and Paulette Van Roekens married in June 1927. The following year, they bought and restored a farmhouse in Trevose, Pennsylvania, where they raised their two children. "They also served as the model of a modern couple: van Roekens used her maiden name professionally, and they taught on separate days so they could share childrearing duties."

In 1949, Meltzer and Van Roekens were notified that their property would be condemned to build an extension of the Pennsylvania Turnpike. Meltzer took leave from the Philadelphia School of Design for Women, and salvaged doors, windows, mantels and other architectural elements prior to the farmhouse's demolition. Architect John Bower incorporated these into the Colonial Revival house he designed for them at 1521 Old Welsh Road in Abington Township, Montgomery County, Pennsylvania. The new house was one-and-a-half-stories, faced with fieldstone, and featured twin artist's studios in an outbuilding they named "Northlight." Meltzer used his carpentry skills to install the architectural elements salvaged from the old house.

Meltzer and Van Roekens painted mostly local scenes, but there were occasional subjects in New York City, New England and Nevada, and foreign scenes painted during trips to Europe. They would also spend part of their summers painting in Mystic, Connecticut.

The couple were married for more than sixty years. Van Roekens died in January 1988 at age 92; Meltzer survived her by almost a year-and-a-half, dying in July 1989, just short of his 96th birthday.

=== Children ===
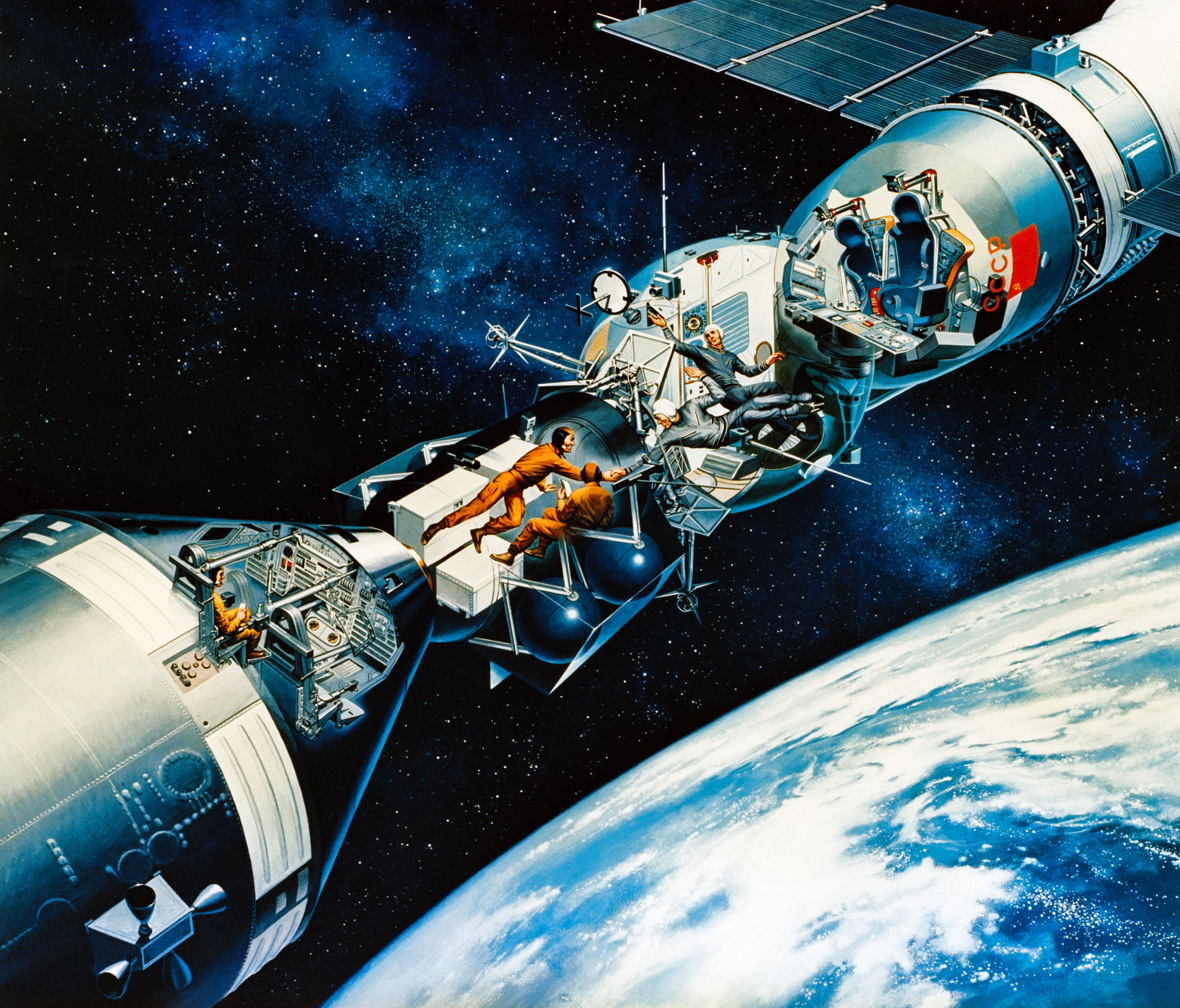
Apollo-Soyuz Test Project (April 1975), illustration for NASA by Davis Paul Meltzer.

Son, Davis Paul Meltzer (1930 – 2017), became a freelance artist, who created stamps for the U.S. Postal Service, painted dozens of book covers, illustrated space flight for NASA, and worked as a scientific illustrator at National Geographic Magazine for thirty years. He married Ilse Aguirre, and they lived in Huntingdon Valley, Pennsylvania.

Daughter, Joanne Fleure Meltzer Craul (1932 – 1999), graduated from the University of Pennsylvania School of Nursing, and became a professor of nursing at the SUNY Upstate Medical Center, in Syracuse, New York. She married Dr. Phillip J. Craul, and they had a son and a daughter.
