= Nefrina =

Ancient Egyptian woman (died c. 275 BCE)

Nefrina (Ancient Egyptian: nfr-ii-n meaning "a good thing has come to us") was a woman who lived in the town of Akhmim, Egypt, in c. 250 BC. She died c. 275 BC, possibly of complications resulting from a broken hip. She was mummified in the fashion typical of the upper class. Her father, Irethourrou, was a member of the clergy; her mother, Irty-rou, was a sistrum player of Min.

== Present day ==
Nefrina's mummy is currently on exhibit in the Reading Public Museum in Reading, Pennsylvania, United States. The Museum received Nefrina in 1930 on loan from the University of Pennsylvania. Her mummy was purchased by the museum in 1949. Using CAT scans made in 2003, her face has been reconstructed in a sculpture by forensic artist Frank Bender.
