= Joseph Thurman Pearson Jr. =

American painter (1876–1951)

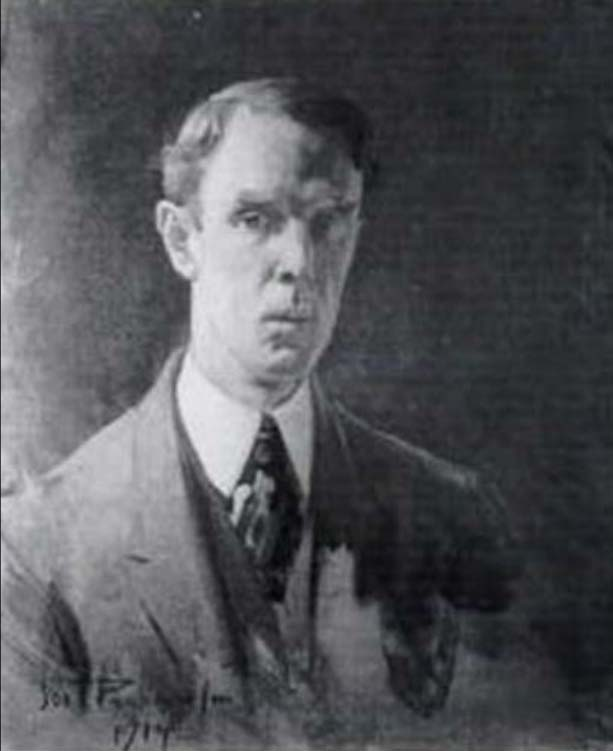
Self-Portrait (1914), National Academy of Design, New York City

Joseph Thurman Pearson Jr. (February 6, 1876 – February 23, 1951) was an American landscape and portrait painter, and an instructor at the Pennsylvania Academy of the Fine Arts in Philadelphia.

== Life and career ==
He was one of the eight children of wooden box manufacturer Joseph T. Pearson, Sr. and Annie Virginia Wells, and grew up in the Germantown section of Philadelphia. He attended public schools, and worked as a draftsman in the office of architect Wilson Eyre, 1894–1896.

Pearson attended the Pennsylvania Academy of the Fine Arts on scholarship, 1896–1901, where he studied under William Merritt Chase and Julian Weir. PAFA awarded him a 1901 Cresson Traveling Scholarship, which enabled him to visit France, Germany and Spain. He studied privately with Weir following his return, and was hired by PAFA as an instructor in drawing. He taught at PAFA for a total of twenty-five years: 1909–1922, and 1924–1937. He also taught at PAFA's summer school in Chester Springs, Pennsylvania.

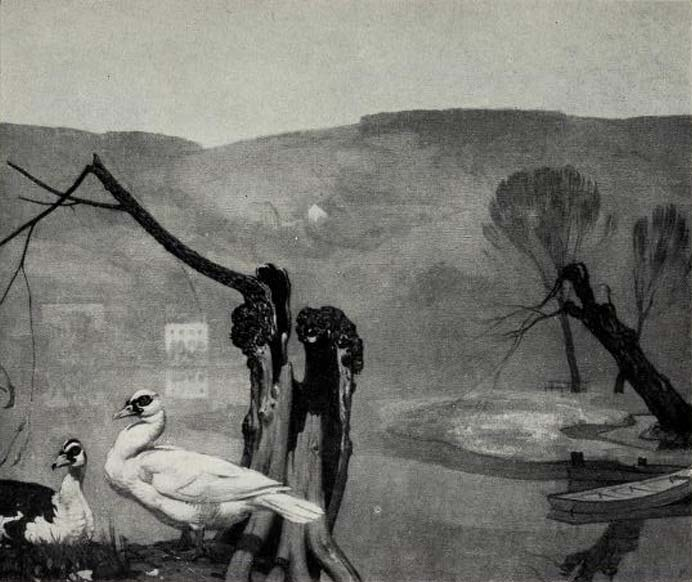
On the Valley (1916), University Club, Philadelphia. Awarded PAFA's 1916 Temple Gold Medal & Stotesbury Prize.

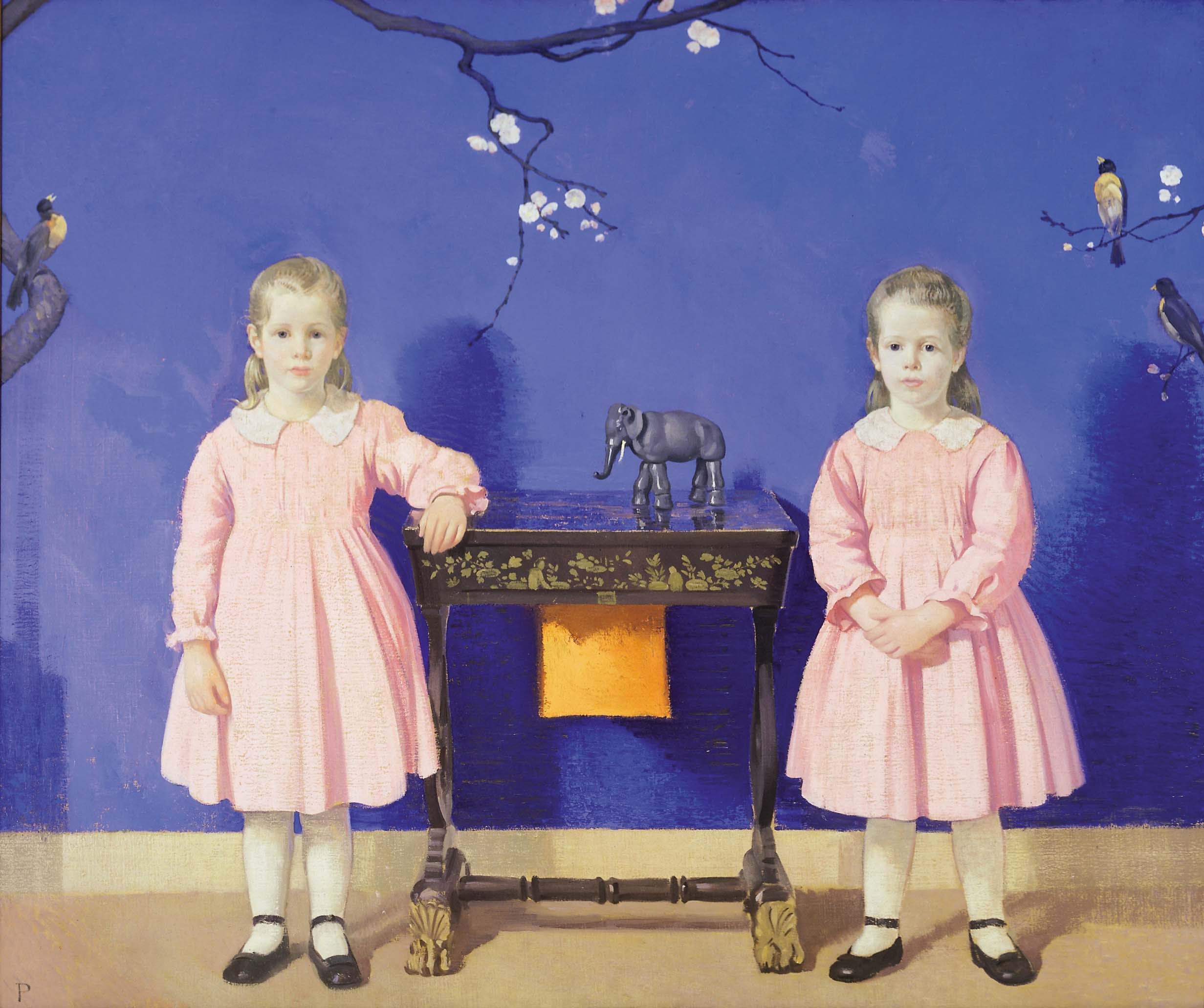
The Twins: Virginia and Jane (1917), Michener Art Museum. Awarded PAFA's 1917 Beck Gold Medal; awarded AIC's 1918 Potter Palmer Award; awarded a Gold Medal at the 1926 Sesquicentennial Exhibition.

He attained early notoriety as a landscape painter for works influenced by Japanese art, and often featuring birds and animals. Among these was On the Valley, exhibited at PAFA in 1916:

Joseph T. Pearson, Jr., has had his great moment this year; he reached a high note of achievement that does not often occur in the thorn-pricked paths of an artistic career. His "On the Valley" not only won the Edward T. Stotesbury prize for a painting never before exhibited—a prize which is awarded by the Directors—but he was also given the unanimous vote for the Temple gold medal by the painters' jury. The composition is distinctly decorative in treatment and very original in conception, with bare, sweeping hillsides, veiled in mist, in the distance, beneath which the still valley opens out before us. The arrangement of two geese and a haunting old tree-stump in the foreground realizes a special quality belonging to Mr. Pearson's art, and in the middle distance is suggestively shown a green bank and trees and a boat, broadly painted, flat in tone, remiscent perhaps of Puvis de Chavannes. There is much poetry and beauty in this picture and the artist has succeeded in making others feel as he felt, transversing the banks of the Schuylkill, the beautiful serenity of what lay before him not alone in the actual scene, but heightened by an impassioned imagination.

Pearson painted a trio of full-length portraits of his wife Emily, including Study in Gray (1905). He painted a full-length portrait of his eldest daughter Ruth as a child, and at least two double portraits of his twin daughters, Virginia and Jane. The 1917 double portrait depicted the girls in identical pink dresses, flanking a sewing table and standing before a deep blue mural. The Twins: Virginia and Jane received multiple awards, and has become Pearson's most famous work.

Pearson volunteered his skills during World War I, camouflaging ships at the Philadelphia Naval Yard. He was powerfully affected by the war, and turned to religious painting late in his career.

Several PAFA instructors were invited to paint murals for the Pennsylvania Building at the 1926 Sesquicentennial Exposition in Philadelphia. Agriculture was the theme assigned to Pearson, whose lunette-shaped mural, Harvesting, was installed inside the building's north wing. (Note: "Over the Agricultural exhibit and in view across the entire building through the Rotunda was a mural by Joseph T. Pearson Jr., depicting Harvesting.") It was the same size—10.75 ft (3.28 m) in height and 21.5 ft (6.6 m) in length—as Daniel Garber's lunette mural, A Wooded Watershed, installed opposite it.

== Exhibitions, awards and honors ==
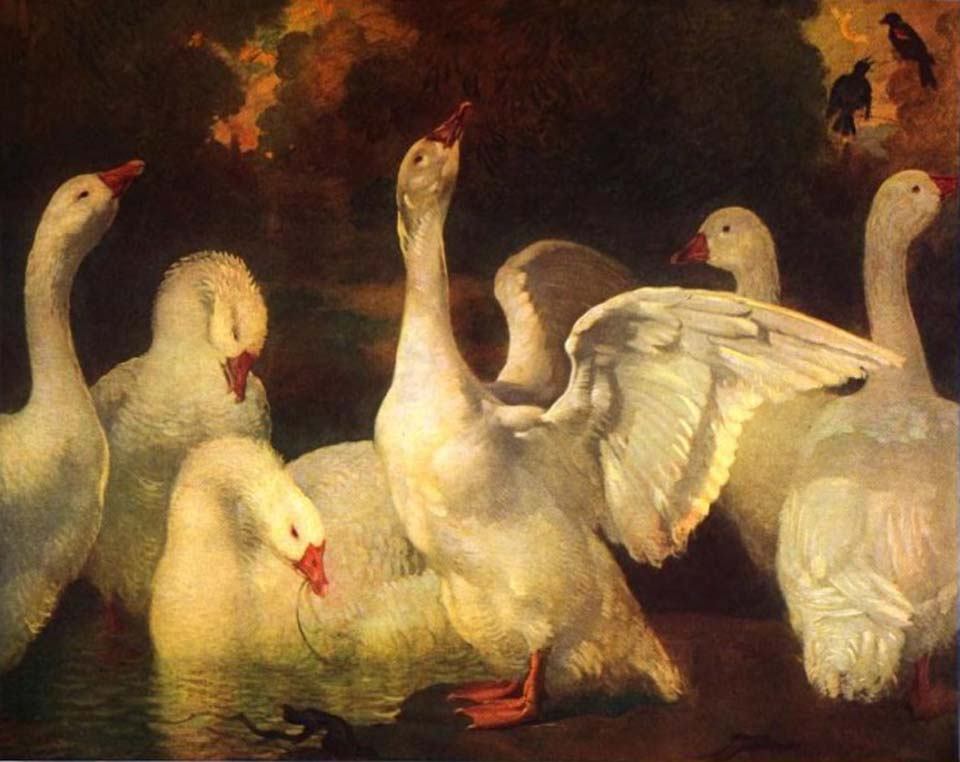
A Group of Geese (1910), unlocated. Awarded PAFA's 1910 Fellowship Prize; awarded NAD's 1911 2nd Hallgarten Prize.

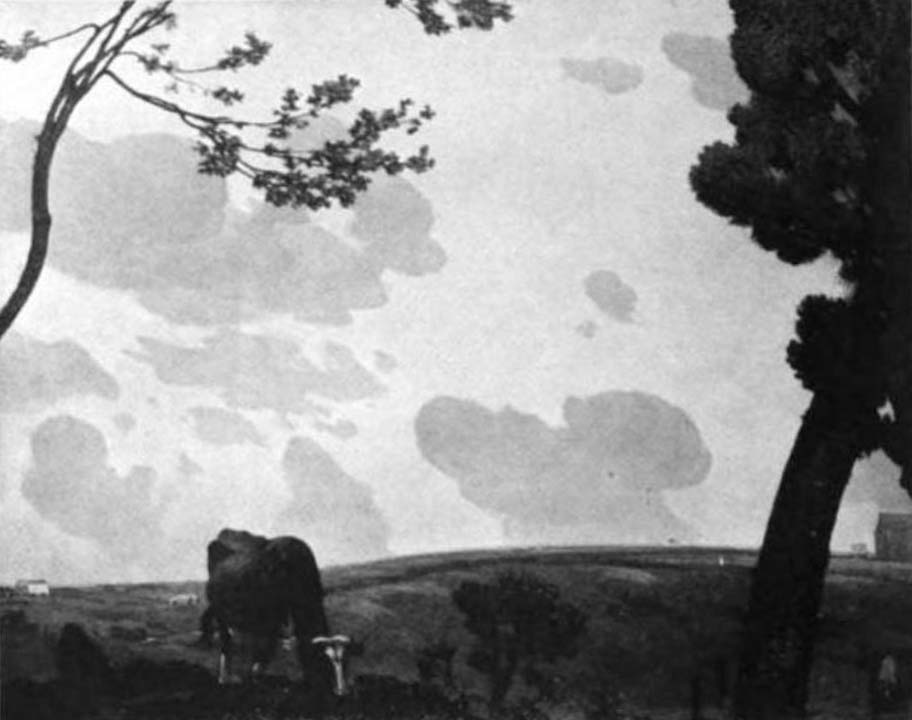
Landscape (1911), unlocated. Awarded PAFA's 1911 Jennie Sesnan Medal; awarded NAD's 1915 George Inness Gold Medal.

Pearson exhibited regularly at PAFA from 1904 to 1917, and sporadically thereafter. A Group of Geese was awarded PAFA's 1910 Fellowship Prize; Landscape was awarded its 1911 Jennie Sesnan Medal; (Note: "Mr. Pearson's landscape with cattle has this severity. A fine schematism regulates the placing of the planes; the very touch is schematic, consisting of multiplied firm, broad strokes. There is an undeniable vividness in Mr. Pearson's work, and one awaits his development with interest. A certain dryness is clearly his danger. Yet so soundly constructed is the landscape which won the Jessie Sesnan medal that it could be hung by those Paul Potters which it distantly recalls.") On the Valley was awarded its 1916 Temple Gold Medal, along with its $1,000 Edward T. Stotesbury Prize; and The Twins: Virginia and Jane was awarded its 1917 Beck Gold Medal.

He exhibited regularly at the National Academy of Design from 1907 to 1918. A Group of Geese was awarded NAD's 1911 2nd Hallgarten Prize; Landscape was awarded its 1915 George Inness Gold Medal; and Spring was awarded its 1918 Saltus Medal for Merit.

The Carnegie Institute in Pittsburgh awarded him a 1911 Honorable Mention (4th place) for Ducks in a Marsh. The Art Institute of Chicago awarded him its 1915 Norman Wait Harris Silver Medal (and $500 prize) for In the Gloaming; and its 1918 Potter Palmer Award (and $1,000 prize) for The Twins: Virginia and Jane. The Philadelphia Water Color Club awarded him its 1933 Joseph Pennell Medal.

Pearson's October was awarded a bronze medal at the 1910 Exposición Internacional del Centenario in Buenos Aires; Ducks in a Marsh and Fox and Geese were part of his Gold-Medal-winning exhibition at the 1915 Panama–Pacific International Exposition in San Francisco; and The Twins: Virginia and Jane was awarded a gold medal at the 1926 Sesquicentennial Exposition in Philadelphia.

The St. Botolph Club of Boston hosted an April 1912 joint exhibition of paintings by Pearson and animalier sculptures by Albert Laessle. The Woodmere Art Museum, in Chestnut Hill, Philadelphia, reunited the pair 31 years later, for a 1943 joint exhibition. Milch Galleries in New York City hosted a 1921 group exhibition of paintings by Daniel Garber, William Langson Lathrop, Robert Spencer and Pearson. The Corcoran Gallery of Art in Washington, D.C. hosted a one-man exhibition of Pearson's drawings in 1937.

Pearson was elected an Associate member of the National Academy of Design in 1913, and an Academician in 1919.

== Personal ==
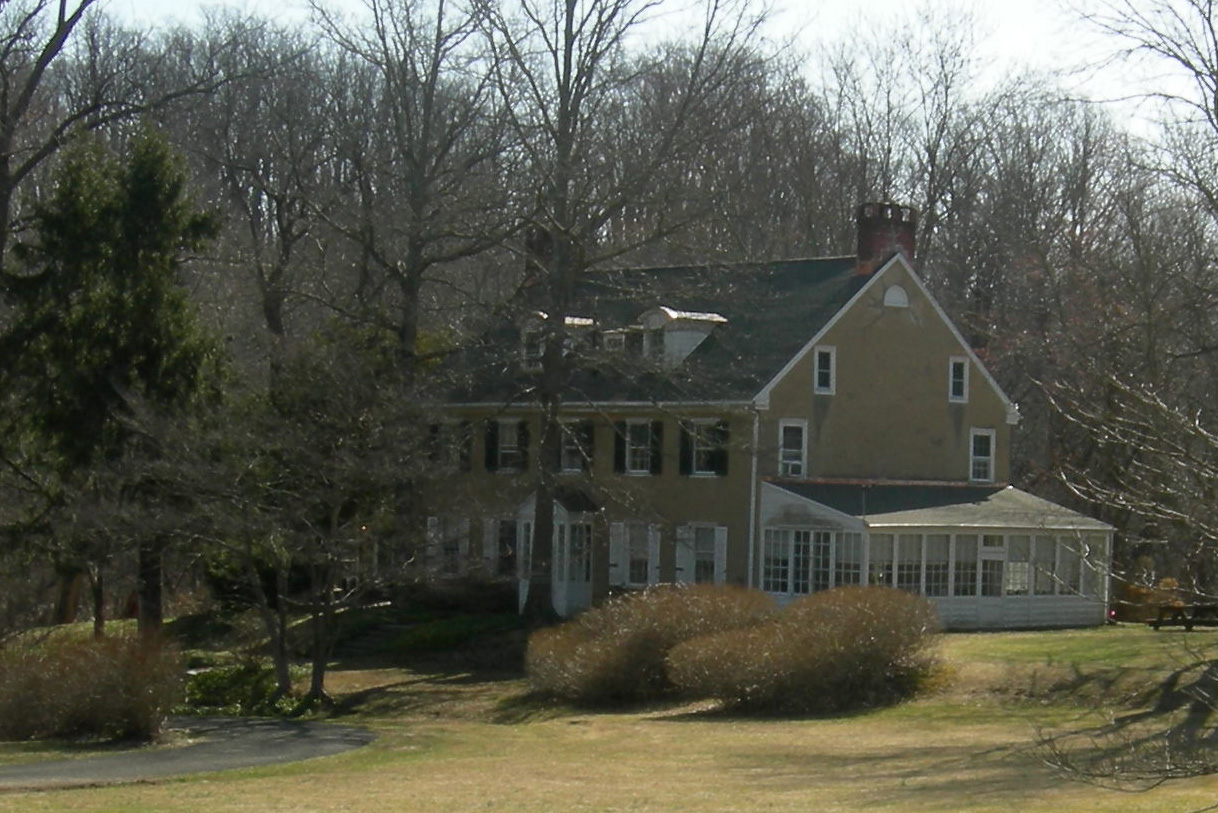
Silas Yerkes Manor House (1790s)

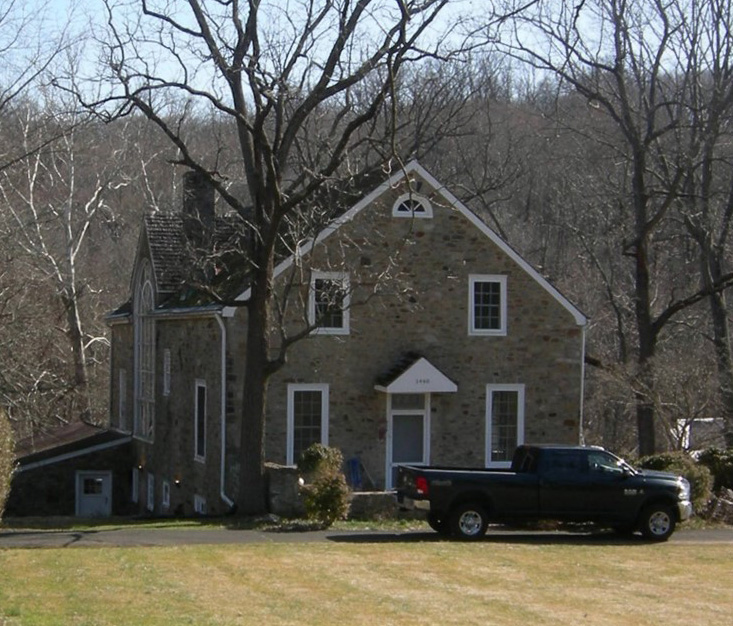
Silas Yerkes Barn (1797) became Pearson's studio

On October 7, 1902, Pearson married Emily Fetter, also from Germantown. The couple moved into the house in which he had grown up, that they occupied until the end of World War I. They had seven children together: Ruth, Joseph III, Emilie, Julian, twins Virginia and Jane, and Justin.

In 1918, Pearson purchased the Silas Yerkes property along the Pennypack Creek, in Huntingdon Valley, Montgomery County, Pennsylvania. He restored its 1790s manor house, and converted its 1797 stone barn into a studio. (Note: Certificate No. 24 - 1440 Creek Road, Huntingdon Valley: "This manor house was constructed in the 1790s by Silas Yerkes as part of his farm complex at the corner of Huntingdon and Creek Roads. Yerkes sold the property to George Shelmire and it became part of the Shelmire Mills complex of the late 1700s to mid-1800s. The entire Shelmire complex was sold to artist Joseph Pearson Jr. in 1918, and he renovated this house for his own use. He also renovated the 1797 barn structure (Certificate No. 21) on the property for an art studio, and the area became known as Pearson's Corner. This home is considered to be a fine example of 'Colonial Revival' style architecture.") "After his move to Huntingdon Valley, in 1918, Pearson reduced his artistic output, probably spending more of his time restoring and renovating the stone buildings and landscaping the property to his liking."

Emily Fetter Pearson died suddenly in 1947. Pearson married family friend and fellow artist Alice Kent Stoddard, in Thomaston, Maine, on May 28, 1948. Stoddard painted multiple portraits of Pearson, who died less than three years later.

== Legacy ==
The Pennsylvania Academy of the Fine Arts mounted a memorial exhibition of Pearson's work in early 1952.

Among Pearson's PAFA students were Ross Eugene Braught, William James Dow, Edith Emerson, Anne Goodell Lathrop, Arthur Meltzer, and Cesare A. Ricciardi.

At the invitation of one of Pearson's grandchildren, art dealer Roy Wood Jr. visited his studio in 1996, forty-five years after the artist's death. Wood catalogued the paintings and drawings there, most of which had never been exhibited. A number of these rediscovered works became part of the Woodmere Art Museum's 2001 retrospective exhibition: Joseph Thurman Pearson, Jr.: A Painter in the Grand Manner.

== Selected works ==
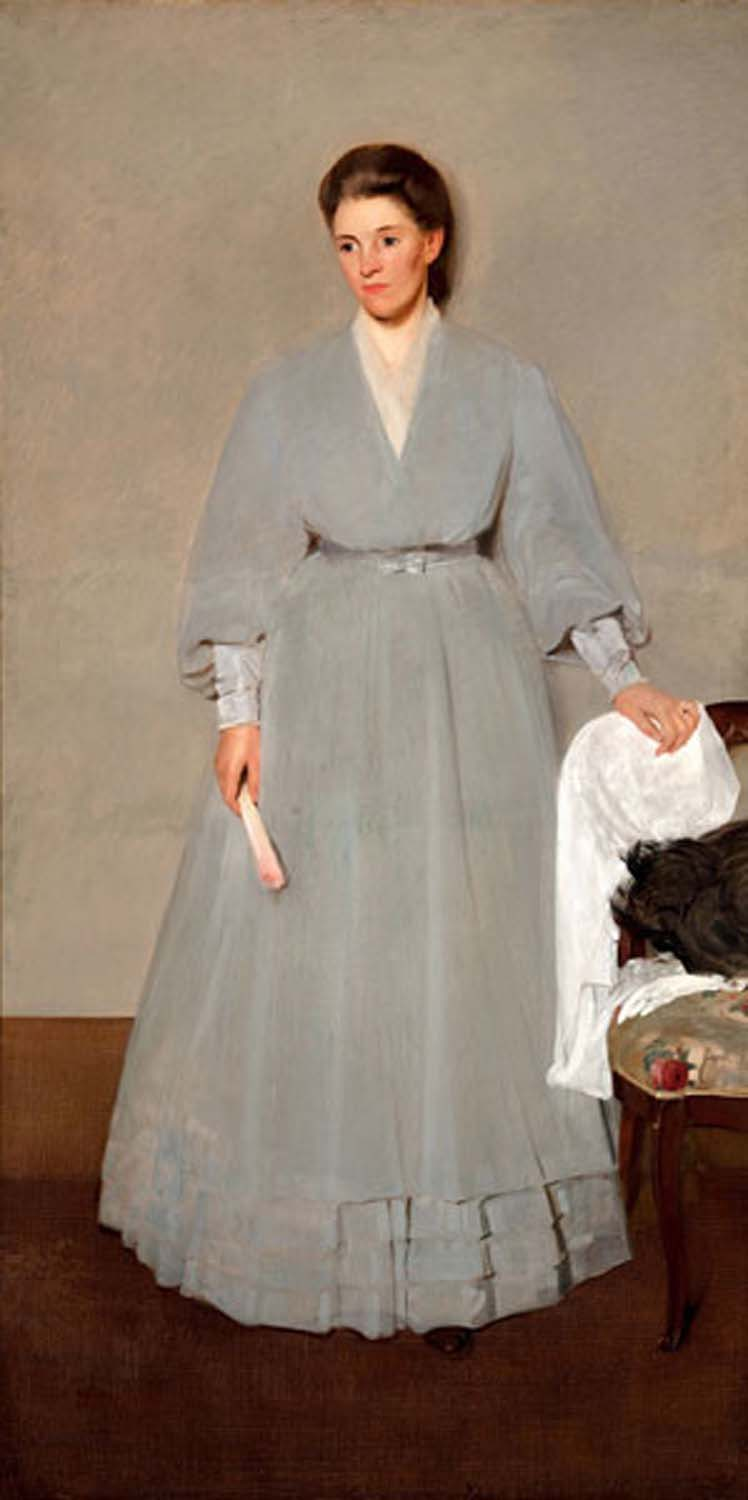
Study in Gray (1905), Woodmere Art Museum

=== Portraits ===
- Study in Gray (1905), Woodmere Art Museum, Chestnut Hill, Philadelphia Portrait of his wife, Emily Fetter Pearson.
- Emily (c.1905), Pennsylvania Academy of the Fine Arts, Philadelphia
- Emily (1906), Woodmere Art Museum, Chestnut Hill, Philadelphia
- Ruth (undated), unlocated. Ex collection: Corcoran Gallery of Art. Portrait of his eldest daughter, Ruth Elizabeth Pearson Whalen.
- Self-Portrait (1914), National Academy of Design, New York City Presented to NAD by Pearson, May 1, 1916.
- The Twins: Virginia and Jane (1917), Michener Art Museum, Doylestown, Pennsylvania. Awarded PAFA's 1917 Beck Gold Medal, AIC's 1918 Potter Palmer Award, and a Gold Medal at the 1926 Sesquicentennial Exposition.
- The Pearson Family (c.1920?)

=== Landscapes with animals ===
- A Group of Geese (1910), unlocated. Awarded PAFA's 1910 Fellowship Prize, and NAD's 1911 2nd Hallgarten Prize.
- Fox and Geese (c.1910), National Academy of Design, New York City. Shared a gold medal at the 1915 Panama–Pacific International Exposition. Presented to NAD by Pearson's widow, Alice Kent Stoddard, May 21, 1952.
- October (1910). Awarded a bronze medal at the 1910 World's Fair in Buenos Aires.
- Landscape (1911), unlocated. Awarded PAFA's 1911 Jennie Sesnan Medal, and NAD's 1915 George Inness Gold Medal.
- Ducks in a Marsh (1911), unlocated. Part of Pearson's Gold-Medal-winning exhibition at the 1915 Panama–Pacific International Exposition in San Francisco. Ex collection: PAFA
- Startled Geese (1913), private collection.
- Upper Pasture (1915), Pearson Trust.
- Up with the Sun (1915), unlocated
- In the Gloaming (1916). Awarded AIC's 1916 Norman Wait Harris Silver Medal.
- On the Valley (1916), University Club, Philadelphia. Awarded PAFA's 1916 Temple Gold Medal and $1,000 Edward T. Stotesbury Prize,
- By the River (1916), Woodmere Art Museum, Chestnut Hill, Philadelphia
- Winter (c.1916), Pennsylvania Academy of the Fine Arts, Philadelphia
- Spring (1918). Awarded NAD's 1918 Saltus Medal for Merit

=== Genre ===
- Germantown, Fall (1898), unlocated
- Over the Hedge (c.1906), private collection. View from the back yard of Pearson's Germantown house.
- Pheasant Hunters (1911), unlocated
- The Closed Shutter (1915), Reading Public Museum, Reading, Pennsylvania
- Mural: Harvesting (1926), Pennsylvania Building, Sesquicentennial Exposition, Philadelphia

=== Religious ===
- In Vain (Crucifixion) (1930s?), Pennsylvania Academy of the Fine Arts, Philadelphia
- Sorrow (Pieta) (1935), unlocated
- At the Foot of the Cross (1937), unlocated
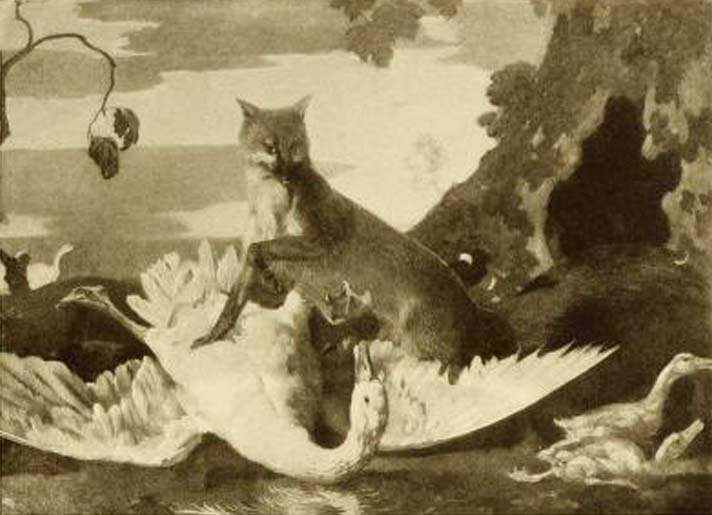
Fox and Geese (c.1910), unlocated

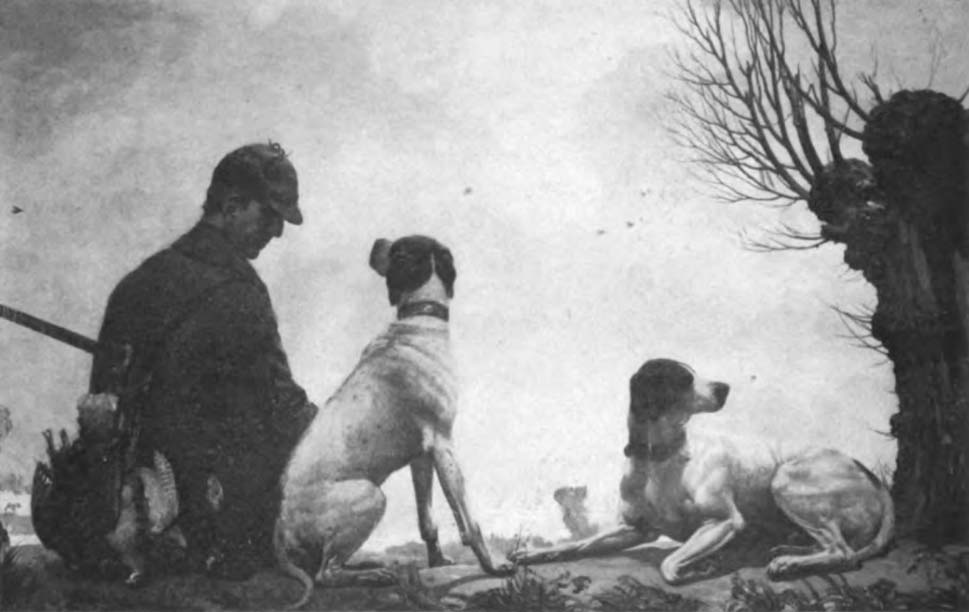
Pheasant Hunters (1911), unlocated

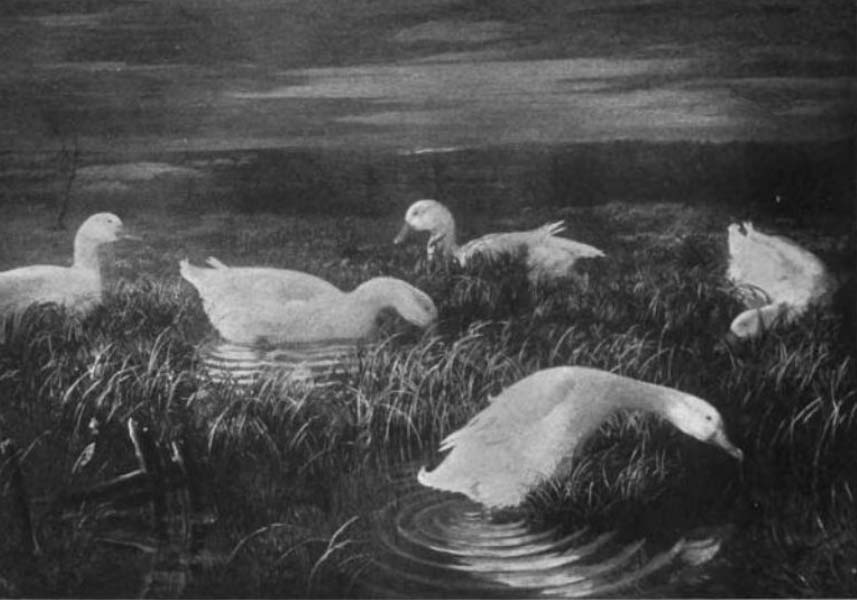
Ducks in a Marsh (1911), unlocated

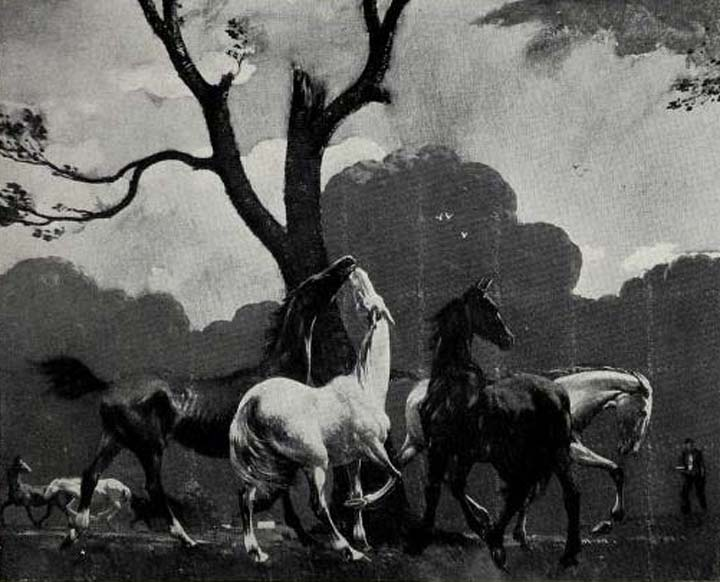
Tempest (1913), unlocated

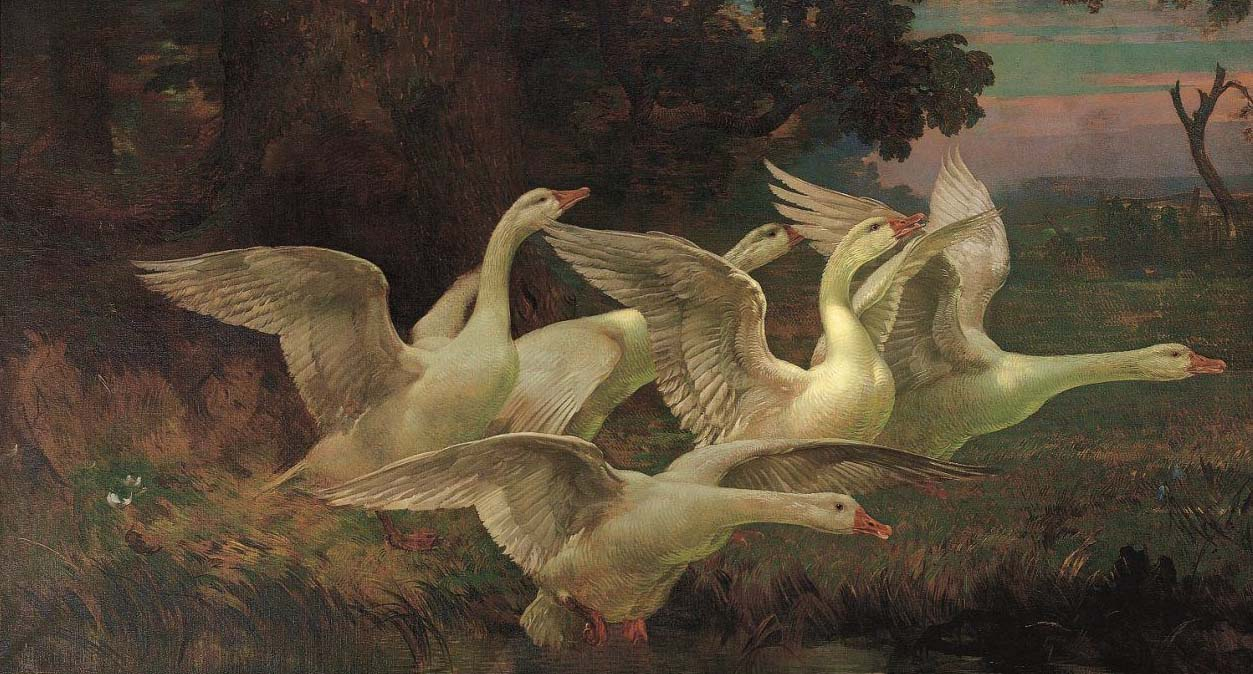
Startled Geese (1913), unlocated

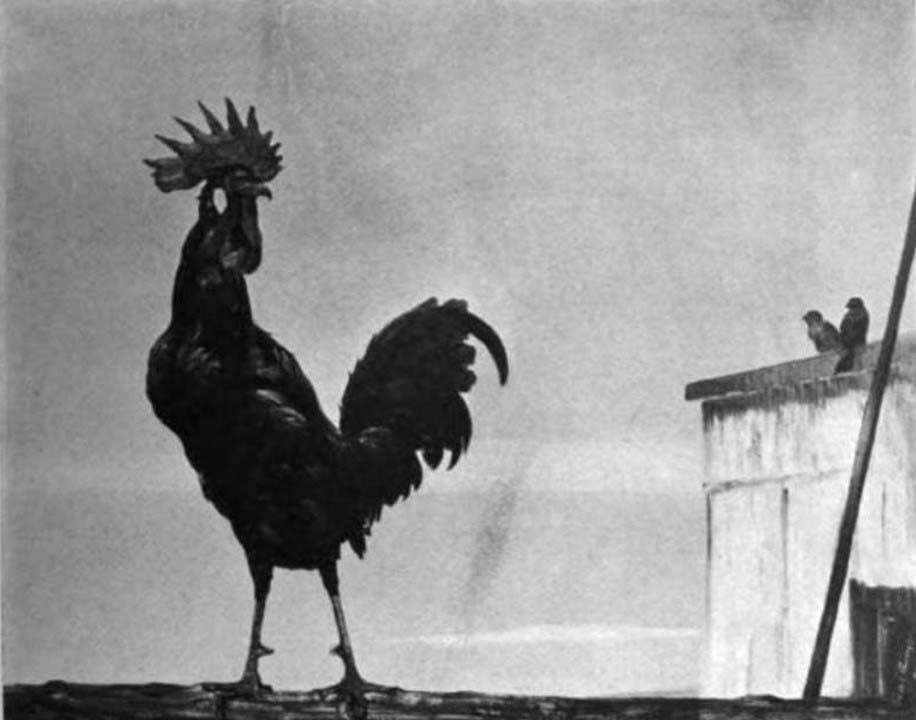
Up with the Sun (c.1915), unlocated

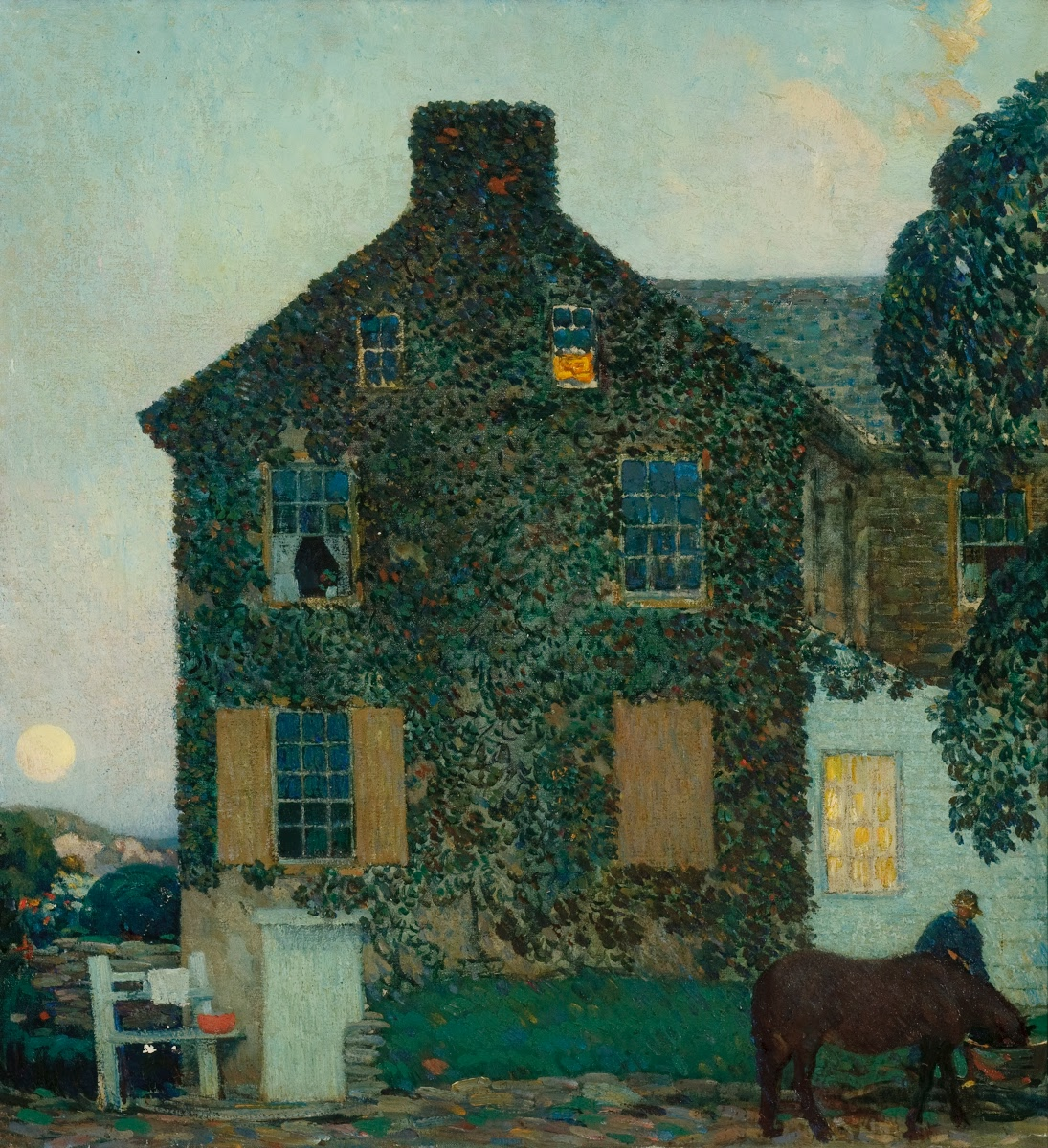
The Closed Shutter (1915), Reading Public Museum

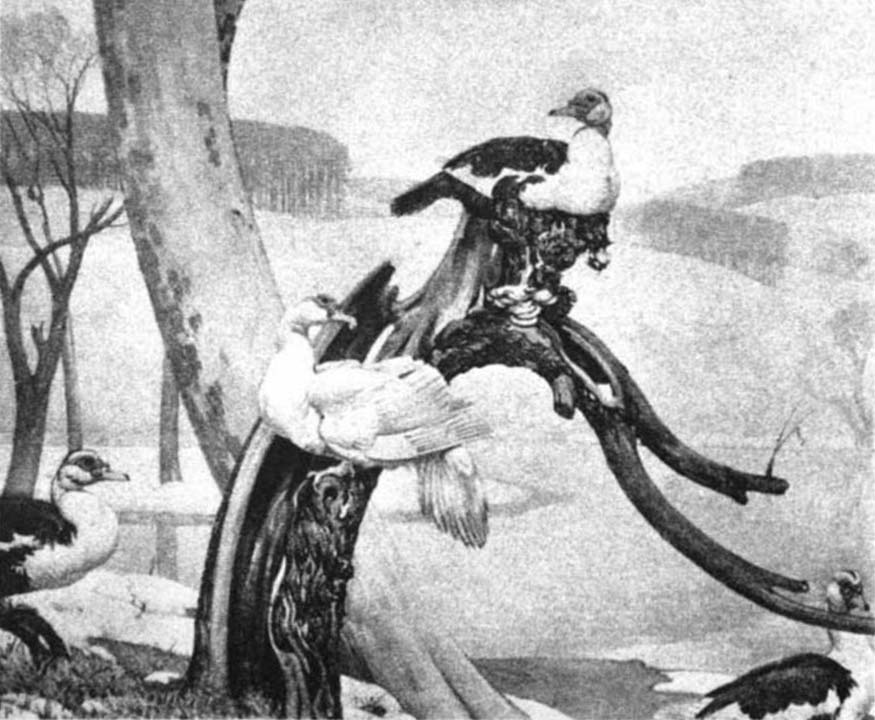
Winter (1916), unlocated

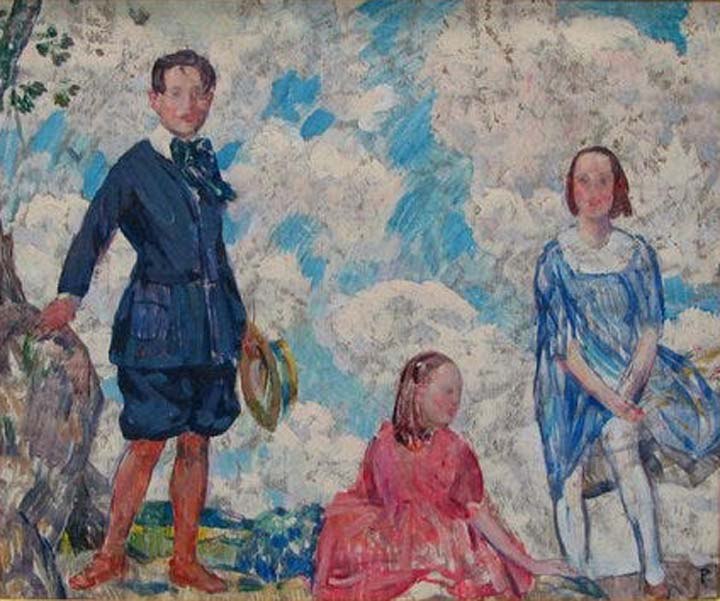
The Pearson Family (c.1920?)

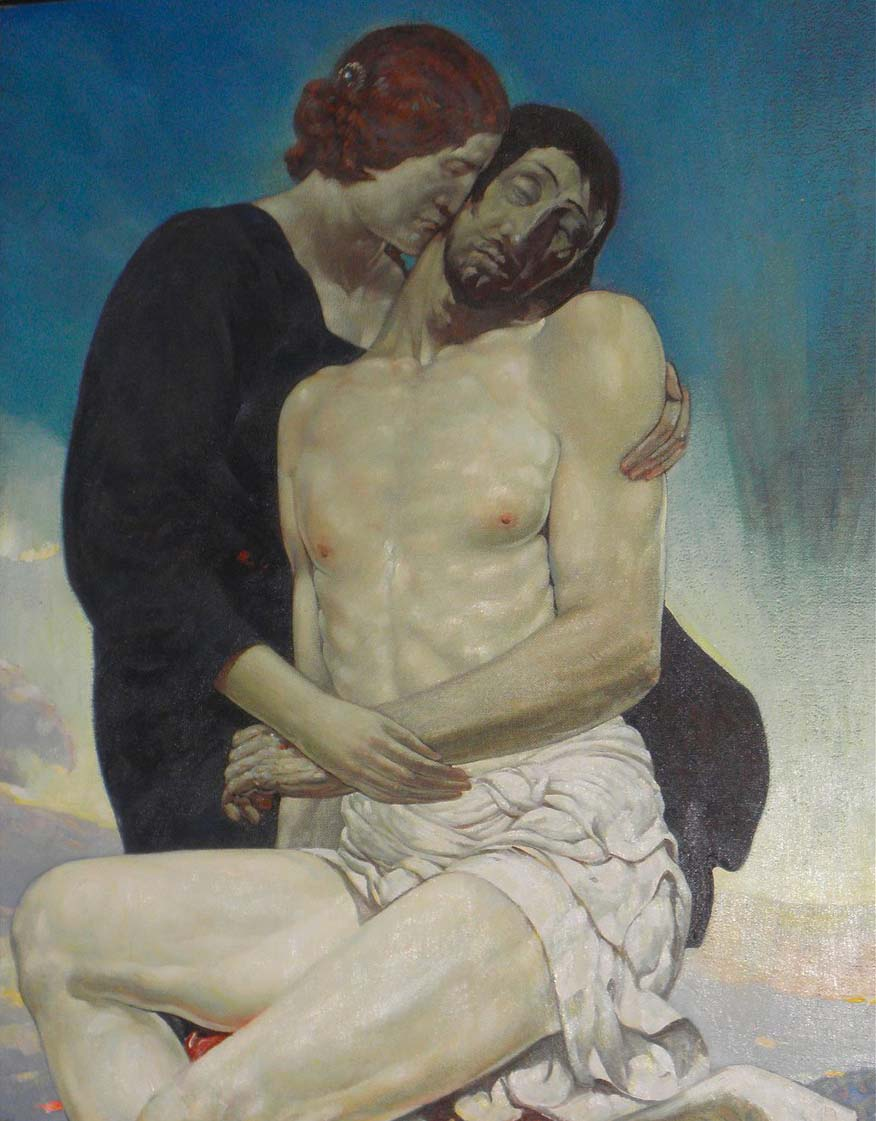
Sorrow (Pieta) (1935), unlocated

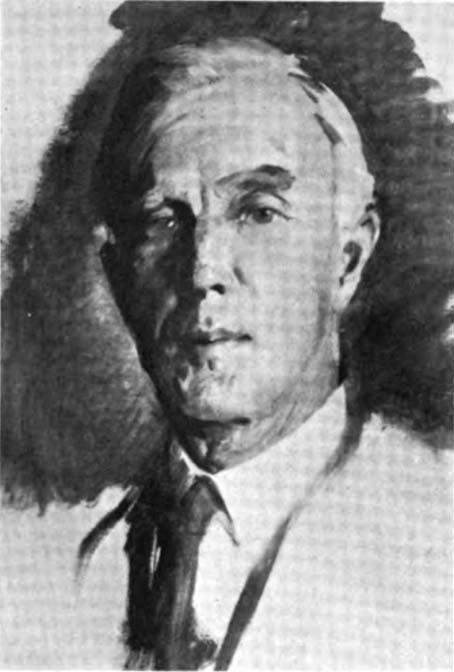
Self-Portrait (1940s), unlocated
