= Levi Walter Mengel =

American entomologist

Mengel circa 1920

Levi Walter Mengel (September 27, 1868 – February 3, 1941) was an entomologist from Reading, Pennsylvania. He was director of the Reading Public Museum. He was a member of the Peary expedition to Greenland of 1891–92.

== Biography ==
He was born on September 27, 1868, to Matthias Schoener Mengel and Amelie Matilde Soder. He died on February 3, 1941.
