= Ptolemaic =

Ptolemaic is the adjective formed from the name Ptolemy, and may refer to:

- Ptolemaic Kingdom, founded in 305 BC by Ptolemy I Soter, including:
  - Ptolemaic dynasty, the Macedonian Greek dynasty that ruled the kingdom
  - Ptolemaic army
  - Ptolemaic navy
- Ptolemaic system, a geocentric model of the universe developed in detail by the astronomer Claudius Ptolemaeus

== See also ==
- Ptolemy, 2nd-century AD geographer and astronomer/astrologer
- Ptolemy (name)
