= Patrick McGrath Muñíz =

American painter (born 1975)

Patrick McGrath Muñíz (born 1975; New York City) is an American painter.

== Education ==
He has received a Master of Fine Arts degree in painting at Savannah College of Art and Design in Savannah, Georgia in 2006 and a Bachelor of Fine Arts degree in painting at Escuela de Artes Plásticas de Puerto Rico in San Juan, Puerto Rico. He currently lives in Houston, TX.

== Career ==
McGrath’s work responds to consumer media culture and the historical use of Christian icons in colonial Latin America. As a painter, growing up in Puerto Rico, one of the oldest colonies in the world and at the same time one of the countries with most cars per square mile, he explores the relationship between traditional icons and the modern-day consumer society.

The paintings project a world filled with unexpected anachronisms where spirituality is transgressed by triviality. Religious symbols lose their original meaning and are amorally converted into disposable marketplace products from the media culture.

This recontextualization of the "retablo" altarpiece painting imported from the Old World in colonial times allows him to question today's assumptions about the demise of colonialism. By utilizing the "retablo" format, Patrick McGrath can emulate previous indoctrination strategies and question the imported set of values from the corporate global economy. The "retablos" act then as purveyors of the belief system intrinsic to a capitalist society, which, assuming control over the media, diffuses the pervasive corporate propaganda and manufactures mass consent with its offers of salvation. While these religious icons lose their aura of sanctity displaced by some product or celebrity, these in turn seem to gain a pseudo-religious position.

In some of his paintings, the cult to TV celebrities and movie stars pretends to take over every possible space, reaching a ubiquitously self-centered divinity status. Many of the "retablos" that he has created are paintings distributed in three united plates. These triptychs operate as history books meant to be read carefully 'between the lines'. The lines in this case are the constant commercial interruptions implicit in the message. The work intends to pronounce a commentary about how the neoliberal globalization, with its consumerist doctrines, transmitted by the media, have altered dramatically the way we understand religion, live, and relate to each other and our environment. Through a redefinition of our cultural identity and establishing a dialogue with history, Patrick McGrath intends to confront the intolerable historic amnesia that affects us all.
