= Alice Stevens =

Alice Stevens or Stephens may refer to:

- Alice Stevens (The Walking Dead)
- Alice Barber Stephens (1858–1932), American painter and engraver
