= George Matthews Harding =

American painter (1882–1959)

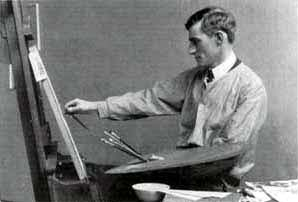
- Portrait of Harding at an easel by William S. Ellis
- Born: 1882; Philadelphia, United States
- Died: 1959 (aged 76–77)
- Education: Boston Tech; Pennsylvania Academy of the Fine Arts
- Known for: American painter; author; illustrator; muralist; war artist
- Spouse: Anita Cotheal Nisbett (m. 1916)
- Children: 2
- Relatives: Charlotte Harding (sister)

George Matthews Harding (1882–1959) was an American painter, author-illustrator, and a muralist. He served as an official war artist during World War I and World War II.

== Life and career ==
George Matthews Harding was born in Philadelphia. At first, he studied architecture at Boston Tech. His final choice of careers was influenced by his older sister Charlotte Harding, who had studied art at the Philadelphia School of Design for Women at the Pennsylvania Academy of the Fine Arts with Howard Pyle. Charlotte encouraged him to attend the Pennsylvania Academy of the Fine Arts. He attended the academy at night and worked as an architect during the day. Following an introduction by his sister, Harding, like some other future AEF artists, studied for a time with Howard Pyle.

Harding's first illustrations appeared in the Saturday Evening Post in 1903, and in 1906 he became an illustrator and author for Harper's Monthly Magazine. While with Harper's he traveled extensively throughout the United States and the world. In 1915 he joined the faculty of the University of Pennsylvania as an associate professor in the department of fine arts, a post he held until 1935. He married Anita Cotheal Nisbett of Ardmore on June 5, 1916, and they had two children. Until 1917, he continued his international travels writing and illustrating articles for the Saturday Evening Post and Harper's Magazine.

When the United States entered World War I, he was chosen as one of eight combat artists attached to the American Expeditionary Forces in France. He began his artistic service as a member of the poster section of the U.S. Navy Publicity Bureau, and from there he was selected for the Army's Art program. Much of the work he produced during the war reflects his attempts to satisfy critics in Washington who wanted to see more action scenes.

After World War I, Harding returned to his painting and teaching in Philadelphia, publishing a limited-edition portfolio of some of his war art entitled The American Expeditionary Forces in Action, and established his own studio and home in Wynnewood, Pennsylvania. While Harding produced his first mural for the Traymore Hotel in Atlantic City, New Jersey in 1915, he gained much wider reputation as a muralist in the interwar period.

He created murals for Post Office Department in Washington, D.C., post offices in Philadelphia and Wilkes-Barre, Pennsylvania, among others. A lost mural by Harding in 1921 titled, "Washington Crossing the Delaware", was rediscovered after a search began in 2021. The 16x10 foot painting originally resided at the Taylor Opera House and was put into storage after it was deemed too large to display at another museum.

In 1942, at age 60, he accepted a commission with the U.S. Marine Corps as a combat artist in its campaigns in the Pacific during World War II. This time, he served as a captain in the U.S. Marine Corps.

His work was included in a few major group shows including "American Battle Painting 1776-1918" in 1944 and "Marines Under Fire" in 1943. Both were at New York's MOMA. In 1957 the Pennsylvania Academy of the Fine Arts would have a retrospective exhibition of his work. In February 1959, his work was part of a three-man show at Lehigh University with Schilli Maier and Benton Spruance hosted by Professor Francis Quirk.

After the war, he produced a series of murals for the Montgomery County Courthouse in Norristown, Pennsylvania.

He died in 1959 after suffering a stroke a year before.

== Recognition ==
In 1940, Harding was elected into the National Academy of Design as an Associate member, and became a full Academician in 1945. He was also elected to the Society of Mural Painters. He was the only AEF artist who served in both world wars.

== See also ==
- United States Army Art Program
Gallery

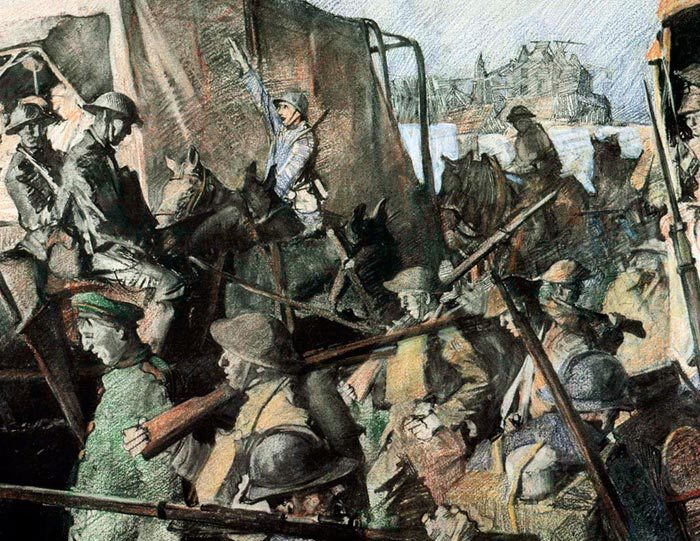
Traffic To Mont-St. Pere

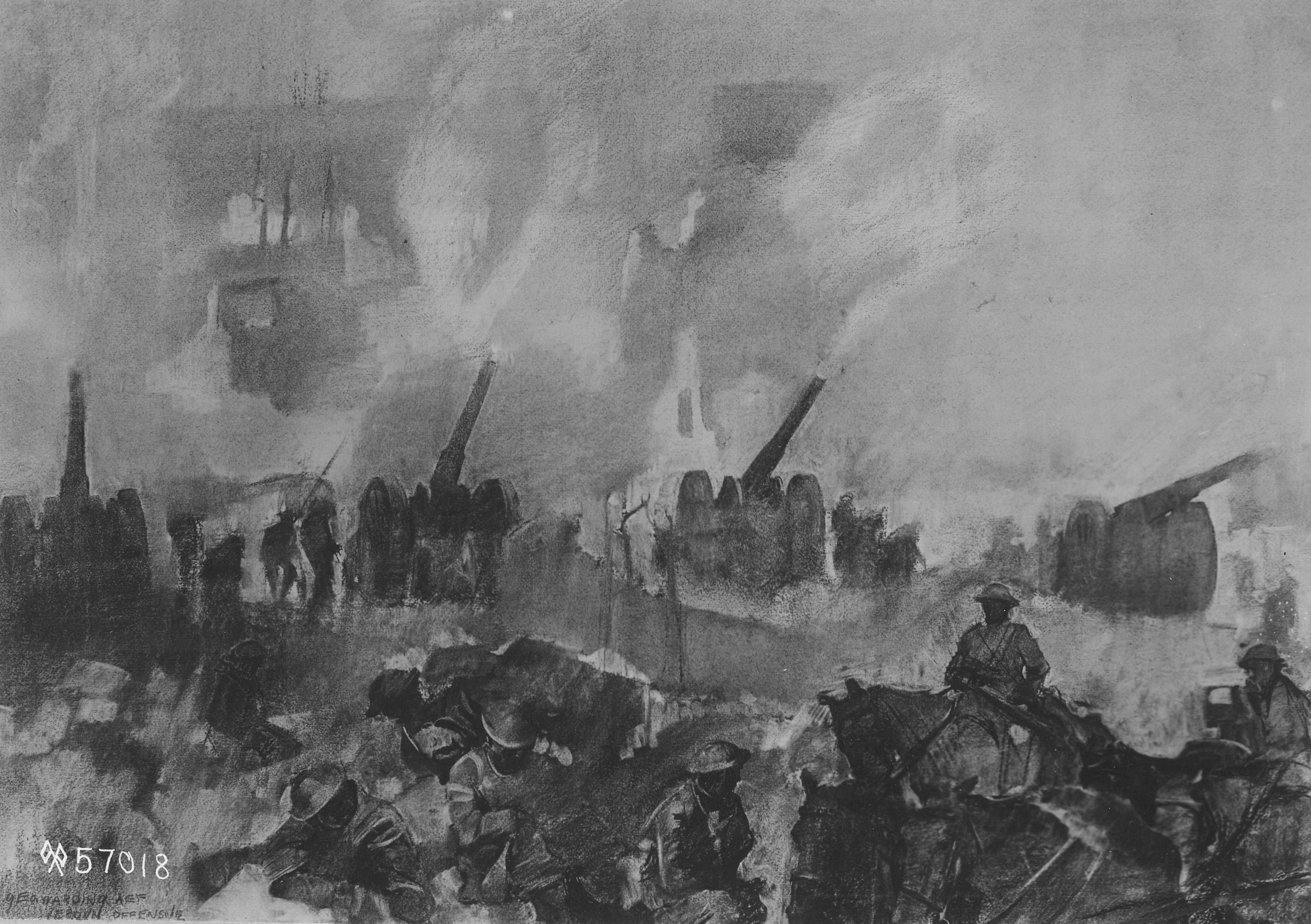
American gun fire, opening of Verdun offensive

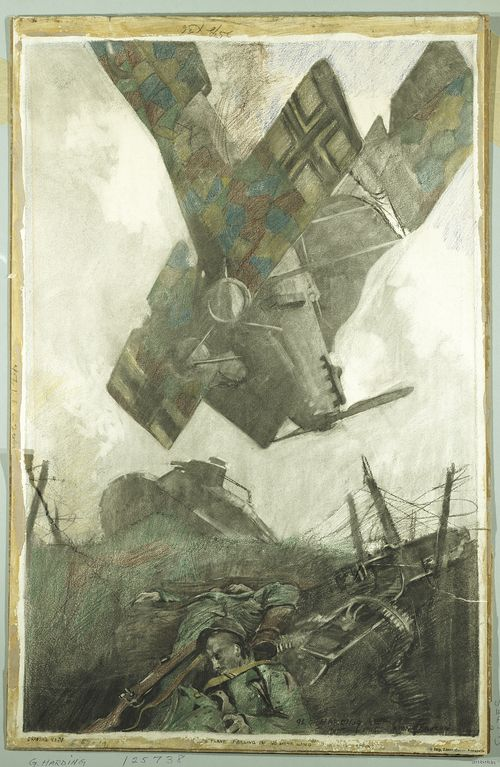
Boche Plane Falling in No Man's Land of Verdun Offensive

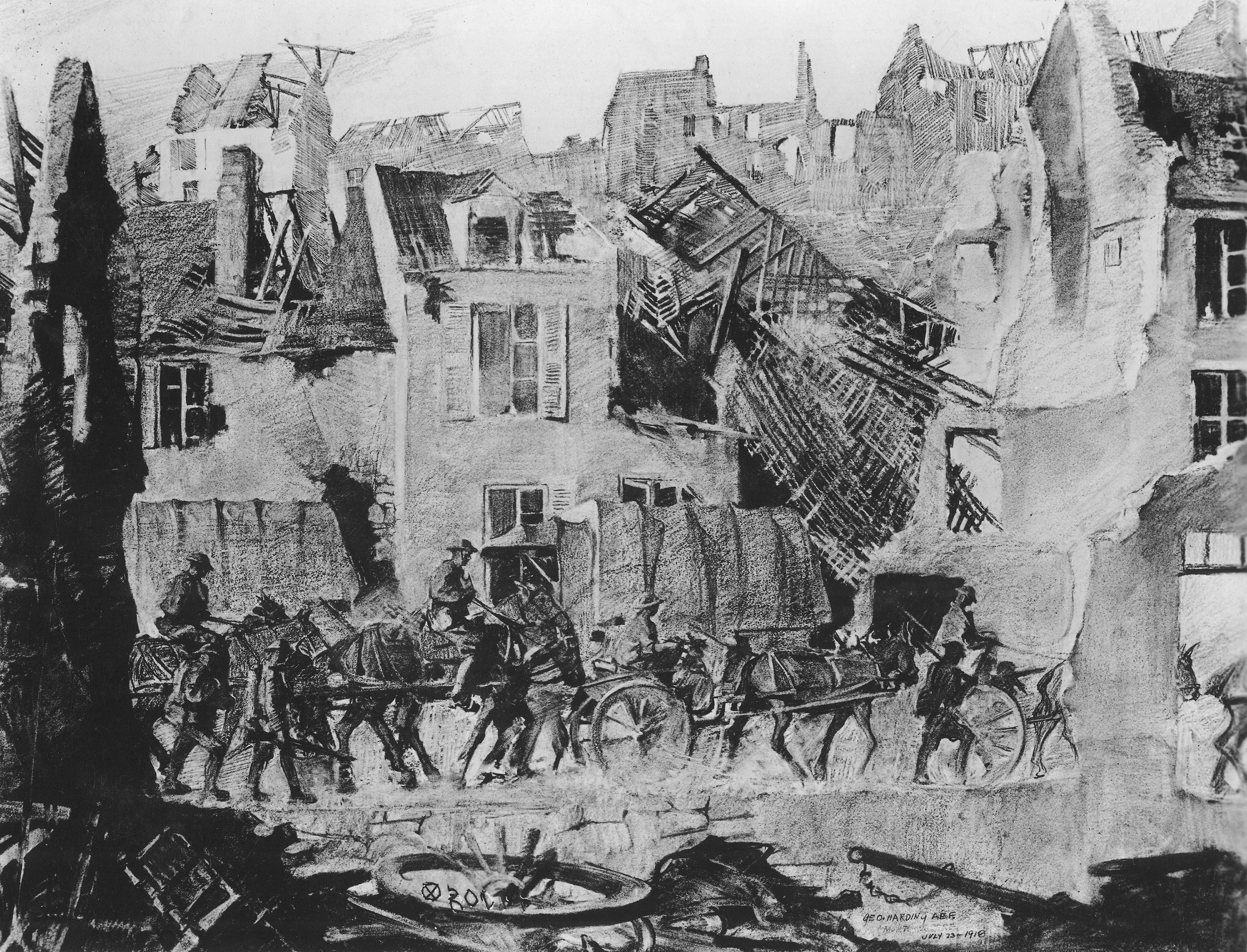
American troops entering a village

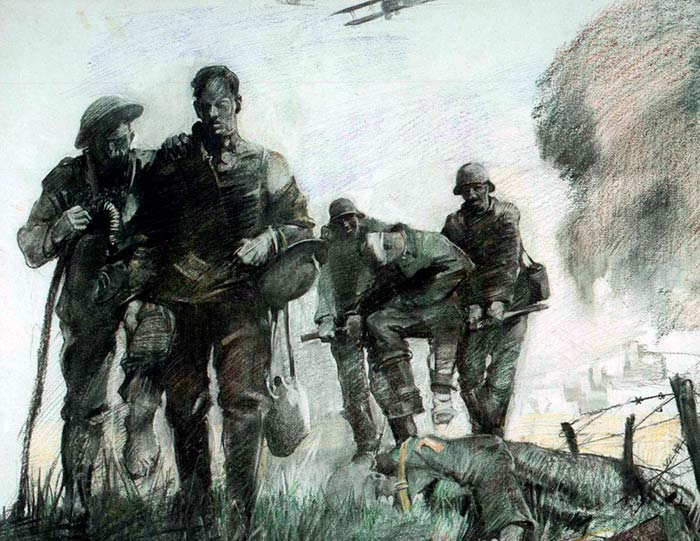
American wounded making way to first aid station

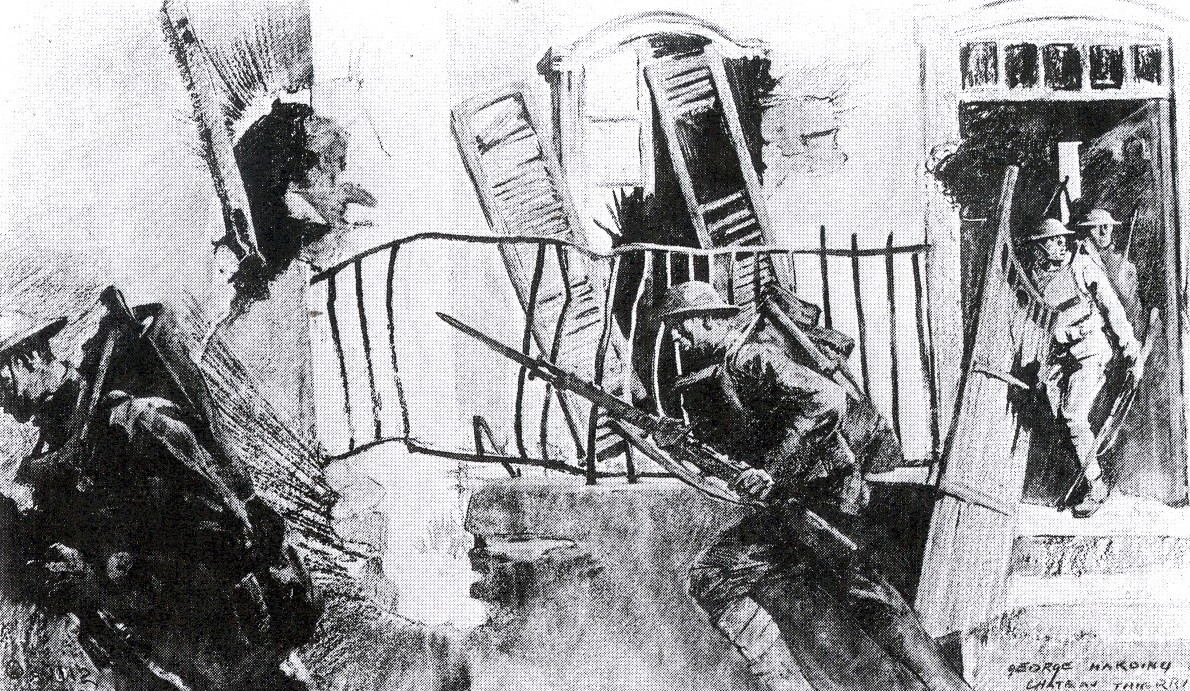
Between shells at Chateau Thierry

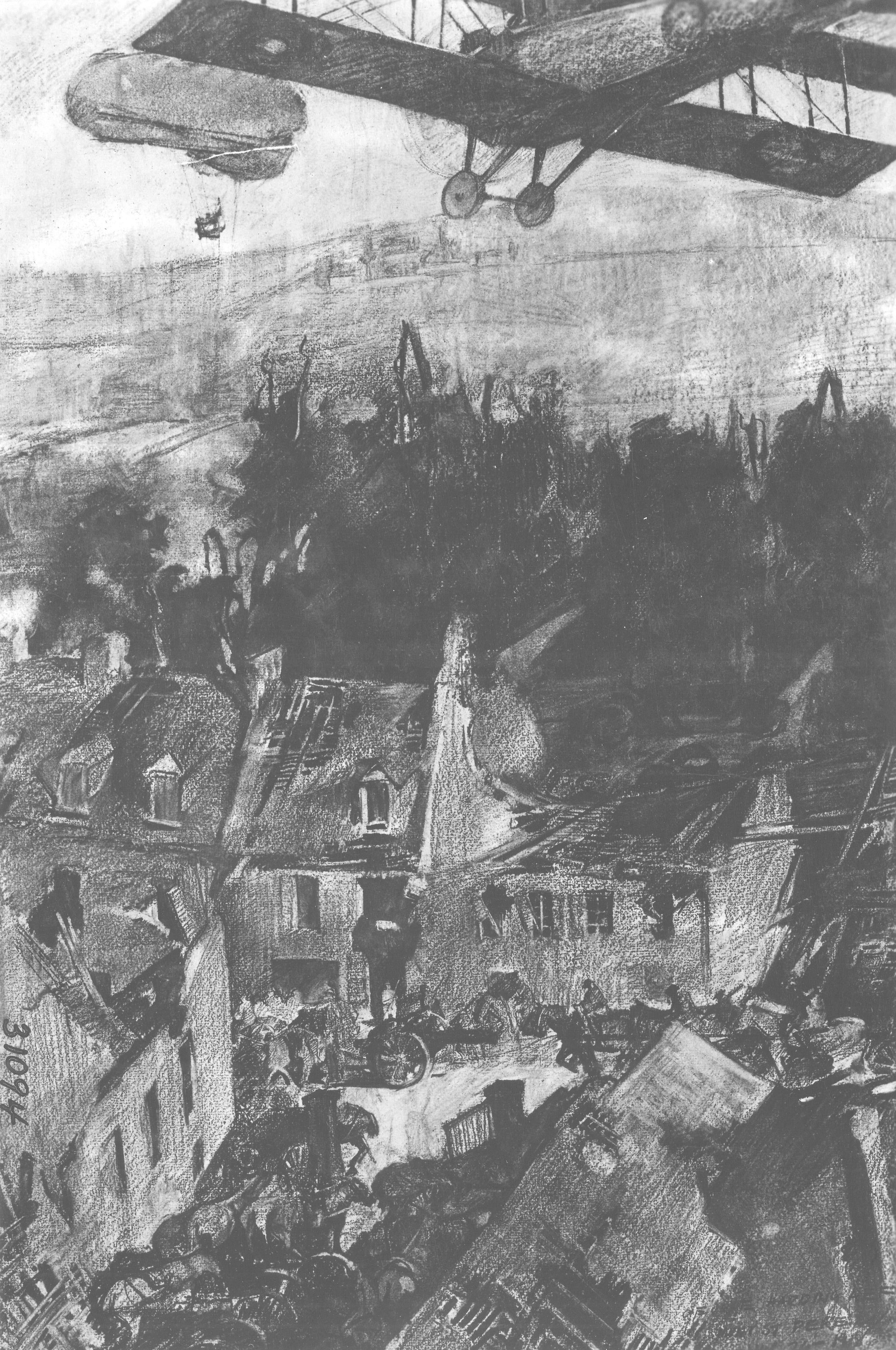
Traffic to Mont St. Pere

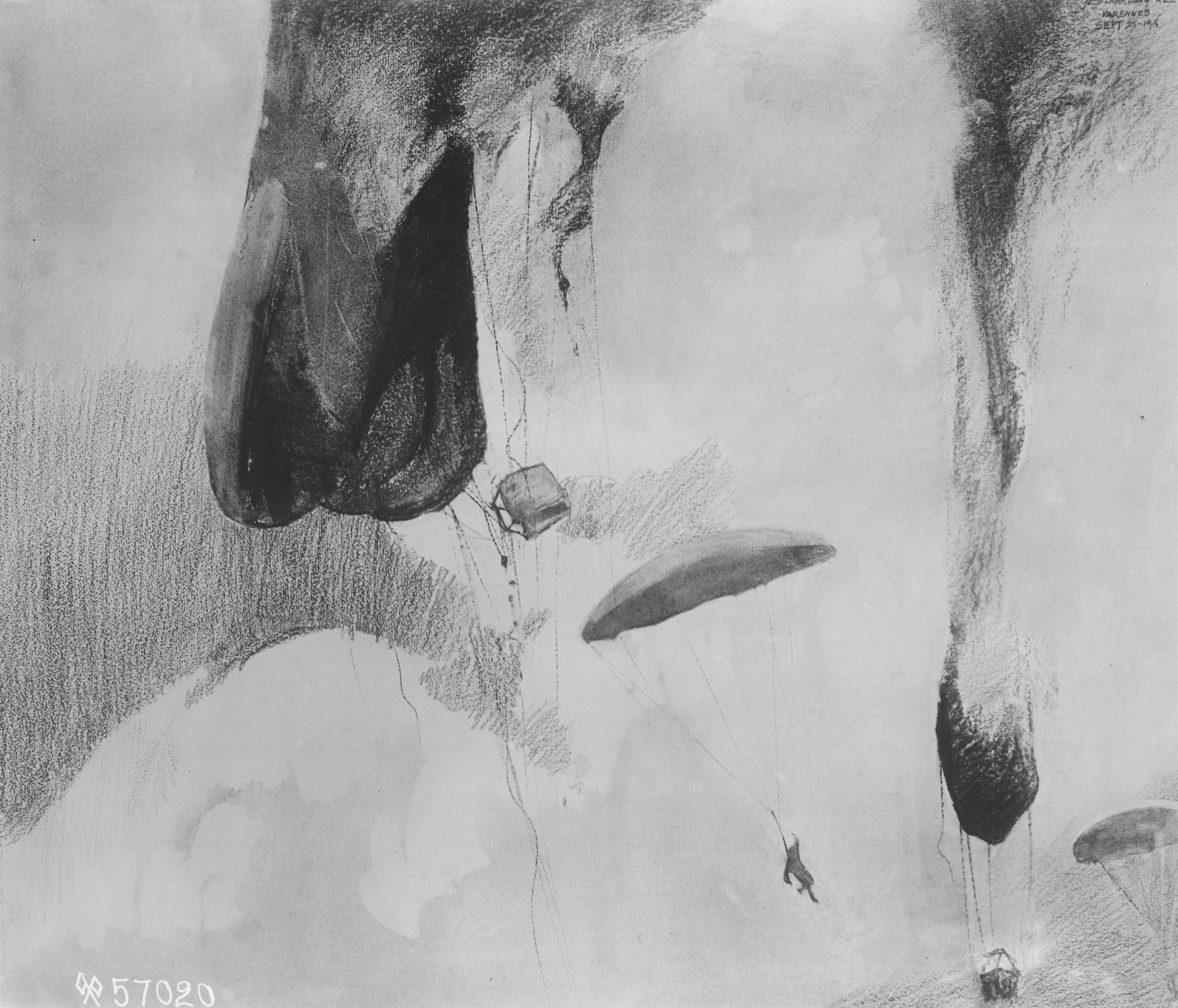
German plane shooting two Allied balloons
