= Alice Barber Stephens =

American painter (1858–1932)

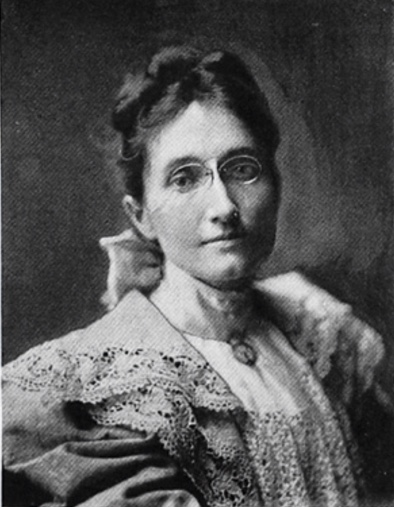
- Born: Alice Barber; July 1, 1858; Salem, New Jersey
- Died: July 13, 1932 (aged 74); Rose Valley, Pennsylvania
- Known for: Painting, Engraving, Illustration
- Spouse: Charles Hollowell Stephens

Alice Barber Stephens (July 1, 1858 – July 13, 1932) was an American painter and engraver, best remembered for her illustrations. Her work regularly appeared in magazines such as Scribner's Monthly, Harper's Weekly, and The Ladies Home Journal.

== Early life and education ==
Alice Barber was born near Salem, New Jersey. She was the eighth of nine children born to Samuel Clayton Barber and Mary Owen, who were Quakers.

She attended local schools until she and her family moved to Philadelphia, Pennsylvania. At age 15 she became a student at the Philadelphia School of Design for Women (now Moore College of Art & Design), where she studied wood engraving.

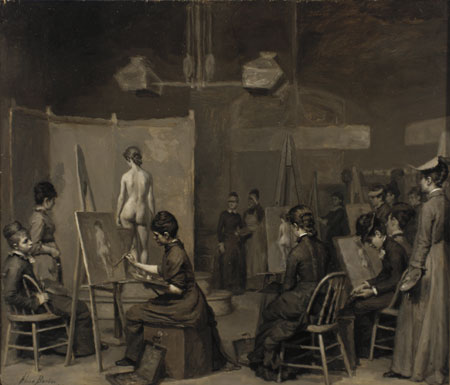
The Women's Life Class (1879), Pennsylvania Academy of the Fine Arts, Philadelphia, Pennsylvania.

She was admitted to the Pennsylvania Academy of the Fine Arts in 1876 (the first year women were admitted), studying under Thomas Eakins. Among her fellow students at the Academy were Susan MacDowell, Frank Stephens, David Wilson Jordan, Lavinia Ebbinghausen, Thomas Anshutz, and Charles H. Stephens (whom she would marry). During this time, at the academy, she began to work with a variety of media, including black-and-white oils, ink washes, charcoal, full-color oils, and watercolors. In 1879, Eakins chose Stephens to illustrate an Academy classroom scene for Scribner's Monthly. The resulting work, Women's Life Class, was Stephens' first illustration credit.

== New Woman ==
As educational opportunities were made more available in the nineteenth century, women artists became part of professional enterprises, including founding their own art associations. Artwork made by women was considered to be inferior by the art world, and to help overcome that stereotype women became "increasingly vocal and confident" in promoting women's work, and thus became part of the emerging image of the educated, modern and freer "New Woman". Artists then, "played crucial roles in representing the New Woman, both by drawing images of the icon and exemplifying this emerging type through their own lives."

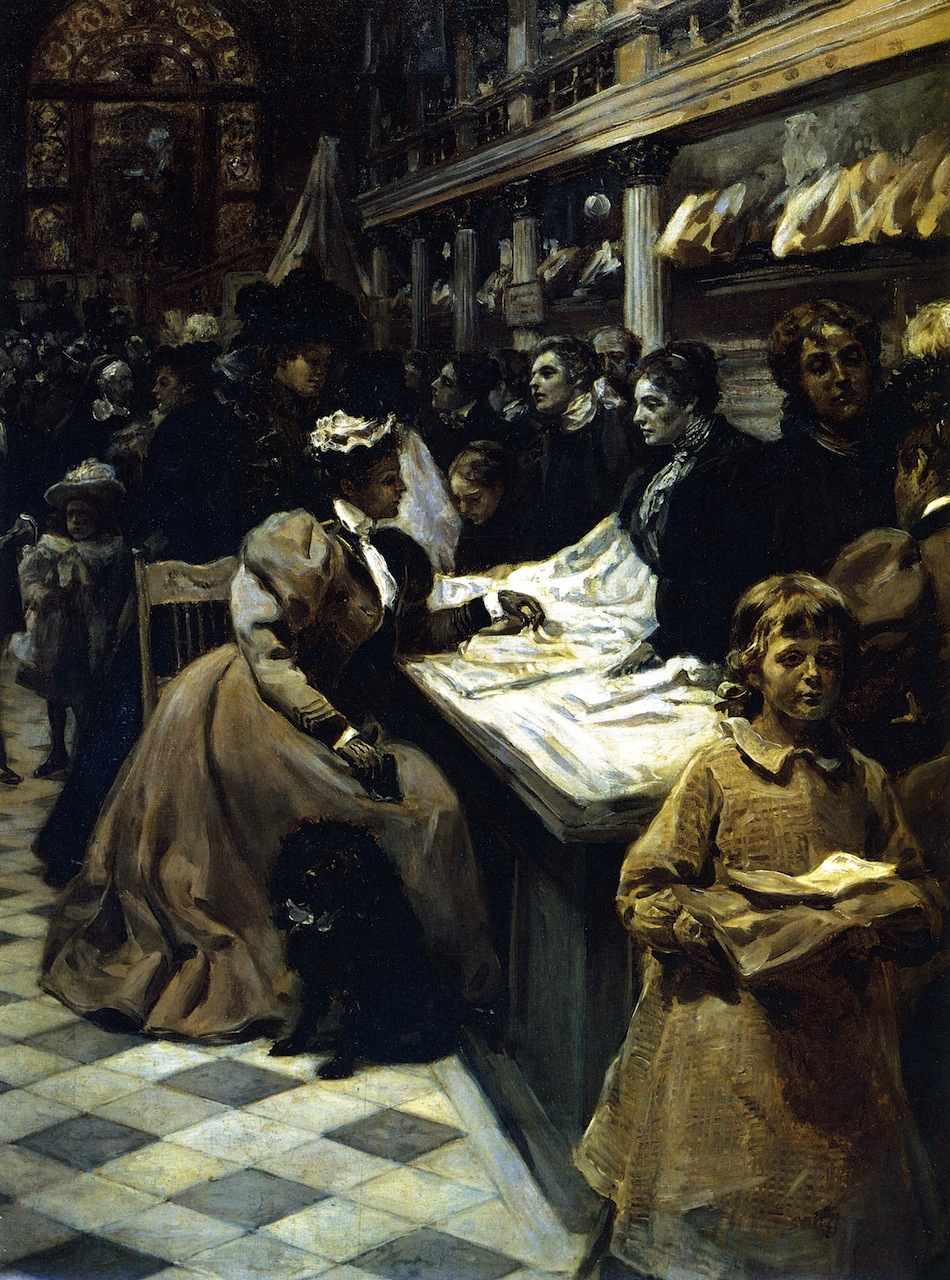
Alice Barber Stephens, The Women Business, oil, 1897, Brandywine River Museum, Chadds Ford, Pennsylvania

One example of overcoming women stereotypes was Stephens' Woman in Business from 1897, which showed how women could focus not only in the home, but also in the economic world. As women began to work, their career choices broadened and illustration became a commendable occupation. People's ideas about education and art started to merge, and the outcome of a certain sensitivity to the arts began to be seen as uplifting and educational. By using illustration as a means to further their practices, women were able to fit the traditional gender role while still being active in their pursuits for the "New Woman". According to Rena Robey of Art Times, "The early feminists began to leave the home to participate in clubs as moral and cultural guardians, focused on cleaning up cities and helping African Americans, impoverished women, working children, immigrants, and other previously ignored groups." Stephens took advantage of the explosion of illustration opportunities, including the opportunity to work from home.

=== Women's education ===
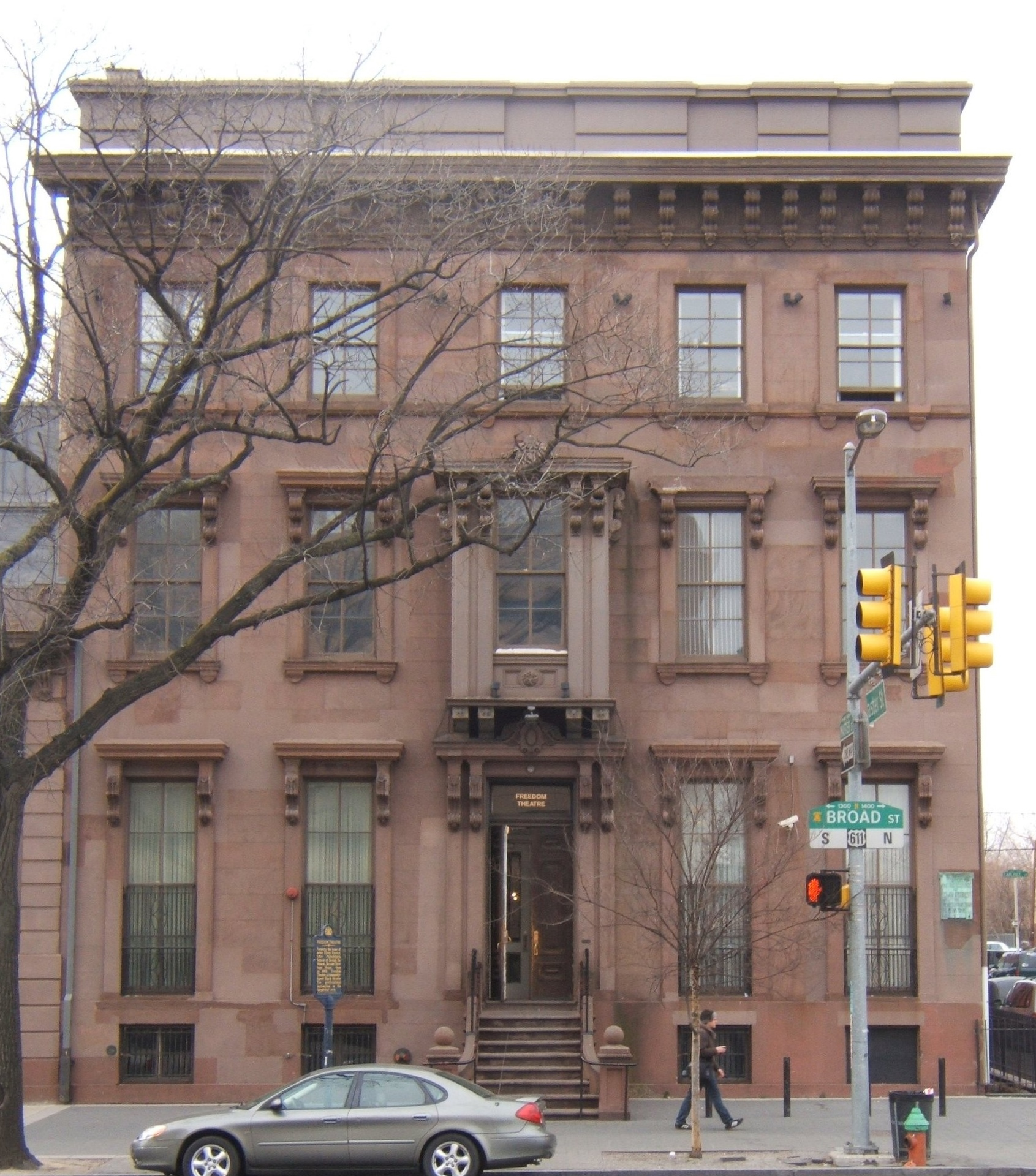
Edwin Forrest House, formerly the home of the Philadelphia School of Design for Women.

Throughout the period before the civil war, textile and other decorative work became acceptable occupations for those who aspired to be in the middle class. The Philadelphia School of Design for Women, founded in 1848 by Sarah Worthington Peter was first among a group of women's design schools established in the 1850s and 1860s; others appeared in Boston, New York, Pittsburgh, and Cincinnati. It began as a charitable effort to train needy and deserving young women in textile and wallpaper design, wood engraving, and other salable artistic skills, providing a means for training women who needed wage work.

The Pennsylvania Academy of the Fine Arts (PAFA), established in 1805 by painter and scientist Charles Willson Peale, sculptor William Rush, and other artists and business leaders. Although they both taught art and design, PAFA and the Philadelphia School of Design For Women were not of equal social importance; the School of Design remained clearly lower in the city's cultural hierarchy, both because it was a women's school and because it was dedicated to commercial art instead of the fine arts. However, curriculum changes instituted in the late 1860s moved it closer to the artistic and social orbit derived from the European academic tradition, like the Academy of Fine Arts.

== Career ==
=== Early career ===
In 1880, Stephens left the Academy to work full-time as an engraver. Her work was in high demand for popular illustrated magazines like Harper's, the oldest general-interest monthly magazine in America, and Century. While she frequently depicted domestic scenes featuring women and children, her illustrations defied categorization in a single genre. Stephens' connection with Harper's began in approximately 1882, as it printed the work of American artists and writers, such as Winslow Homer and Mark Twain. Much of her work was published in Harper's Young People (later known as Harper's Round Table).

By the mid-1880s, however, Stephens' pace of work began to affect her health. She started to shift into pen-and-ink illustration. Her health continued to suffer, however. In an effort to recuperate, during 1886–1887, she traveled to Europe to sketch, study, and rest. In Paris, she studied at the Académie Julian and the Académie Colarossi. She exhibited two works, a pastel study and engraving, at the Paris Salon in 1887.

Upon her return from Europe, Stephens resumed her illustration career with contributions to the Ladies' Home Journal and several book projects for Houghton Mifflin and Crowell publishers. Likely influenced by her European travels (and potentially by her husband), she also began painting in oil.

Stephens exhibited her work at the Palace of Fine Arts and The Woman's Building at the 1893 World's Columbian Exposition in Chicago, Illinois.

=== Educator ===
In 1888, she began to teach courses at the Philadelphia School of Design for Women. Around the same time, with artist and educator Emily Sartain, she was one of the founders and officers of The Plastic Club of Philadelphia (1897), the oldest art club for women in continuous existence. During this period she also co-founded the Civic Club of Philadelphia.

Among Stephens' students at the School of Design was Charlotte Harding, who became a well-known illustrator. Harding also worked for Century, Harper’s and other popular magazines at the time. Stephens later invited Harding to share her studio, located at 1004 Chestnut Street in Philadelphia. The Chestnut Street studio became a meeting point for other artists, including students from the School of the Design and the Academy of Fine Arts.

=== Illustrator and painter ===
She illustrated Sarah Orne Jewett's An Every-Day Girl (1890). Her painting The Germania Orchestra at the Pennsylvania Academy of the Fine Arts (1891) is now among the collection of the Biggs Museum of American Art in Dover, Delaware. During the mid-1890s, following the development of the halftone process, Stephens started to use more varied media, including watercolor, for her illustrations. The increasing popularity of her illustrations for mystery stories earned her the title "Mistress of Mysteries."

In 1895, The Philadelphia Inquirer noted when referring to Stephens that "there is scarcely any American illustrator better known to-day." That year, Sir Arthur Conan Doyle's The Stark Munro Letters was published, which was illustrated by Stephens.

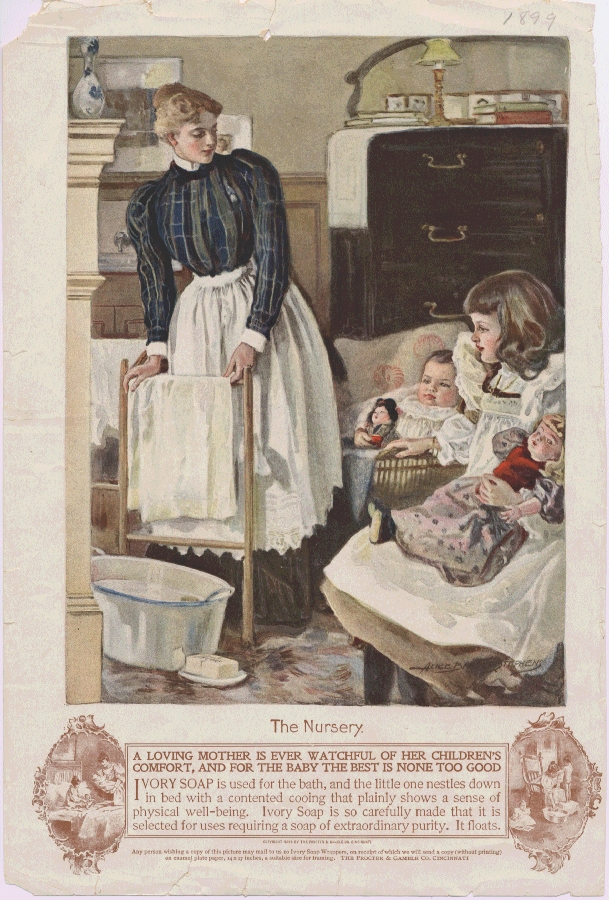
"The Nursery" by Alice Barber Stephens. 1898 Ivory Soap advertisement.

Throughout the year 1897, Ladies' Home Journal ran a series called "The American Woman," featuring six full-page illustrations by Stephens. The illustrations depicted the American Woman in six different settings: society, religion, home, summer, business, and motherhood. Notably, Stephens, who was both a career artist and the mother of a then-four-year-old son, chose to set three of the scenes inside the home, and three outside the home. She illustrated Mary E. Wilkins' The People of Our Neighborhood, which was published in 1898.

In 1899, Stephens was invited to teach at the Pennsylvania Academy of the Fine Arts, but she declined the offer due to poor health. Following another European sojourn during 1901–1902, Stephens also completed illustrations for the 1903 edition of Louisa May Alcott's Little Women. During Stephens' time in Paris in 1902, Maria Christina of Spain requested that Stephens paint her portrait.

Stephens continued to work as a renowned illustrator and completed illustrations for the 1903 edition of Louisa May Alcott's Little Women. She served on the jury for the Louisiana Purchase Exposition in St. Louis. In 1904, more commonly known as the St. Louis World's Fair.

During the late 1910s, the pace of Stephens' work began to slow. She reportedly told an interviewer that she refused to work during World War I, saying it was not "worthwhile to make pictures in the midst of destruction." In 1917, Hamlin Garland's A Son of the Middle Border was published, which was illustrated by Stephens.

In the later part of her career, in the 1920s, Stephens' illustrations were made of mostly washes or charcoal with washes. She painted landscapes and portraits of Quakers and Pennsylvania Germans. By 1926, she had ceased working commercially.

In 1929, the Plastic Club held a retrospective exhibition of her work in Philadelphia.

== Personal life and death ==
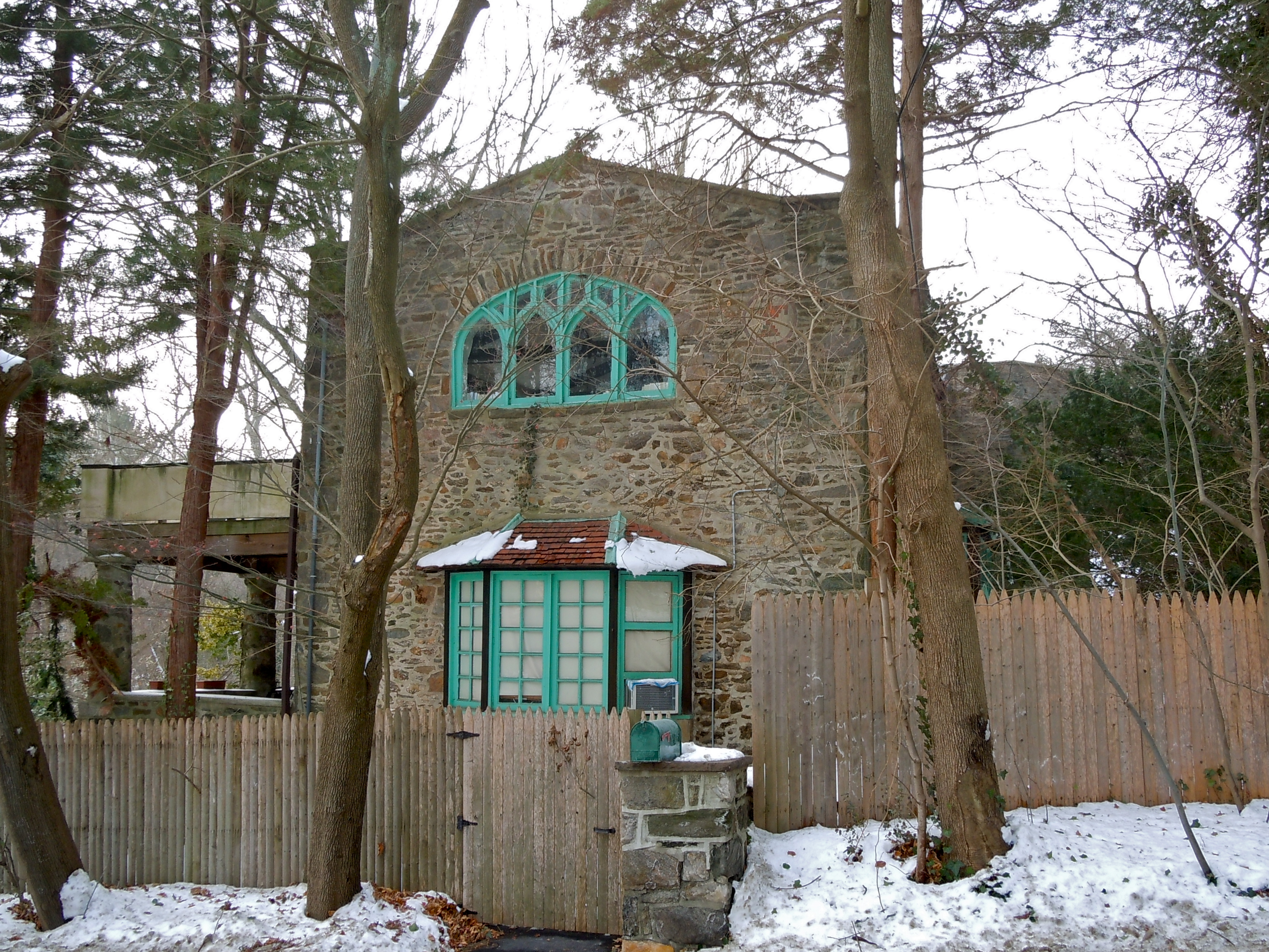
Thunderbird Lodge

In June 1890, Stephens married Charles Hallowell Stephens (1855–1931), an instructor at the Pennsylvania Academy of the Fine Arts. According to Charles' student Helen W. Henderson, Alice Barber and Charles H. Stephens had first become attached while they were both students at the Academy, and a "long romantic engagement" preceded their eventual marriage. They had one son, D. Owen Stephens (1894–1937), who also became an artist. Following a long trip abroad in 1901–1902, the Stephenses had architect William Lightfoot Price convert a stone barn in the utopian community of Rose Valley, Pennsylvania into Thunderbird Lodge (1904), a sprawling house that contained studios for both of them.

She died in 1932 at Thunderbird Lodge at the age of 74, after having a paralytic stroke. She is buried in West Laurel Hill Cemetery in Bala-Cynwyd.

Following her death, her son Owen donated a collection of Stephens' drawings to the Library of Congress, which held an exhibition during the spring of 1936. In 1984, the Brandywine River Museum featured her work in a major exhibition. Her papers are in the Archives of American Art at the Smithsonian Institution. The collection also consists of correspondence, clippings concerning Stephens' work, nine reproductions of her illustrations, photographs she had taken, an exhibition catalog for the Plastic Club (1898), a booklet about her and three award certificates (1884–1895). These items were donated in 1988 by Stephens’ granddaughter and her husband.

== Awards and prizes ==
In 1890, she won the Mary Smith Prize for best painting for a resident woman artist at the annual Pennsylvania Academy of the Fine Arts exhibition for her work Portrait of a Boy.

At the 1895 Atlanta Exposition, a world's fair in Atlanta held to stimulate trade, she won a bronze medal and in 1899 won a gold medal at an exhibition in Earl's Court, London for her illustration of George Eliot's Middlemarch and Maria Mulock Craik's John Halifax, Gentleman. A year later, her illustrations for Nathaniel Hawthorne's The Marble Faun won a bronze medal at the Exposition Universalle in Paris.

== Gallery ==
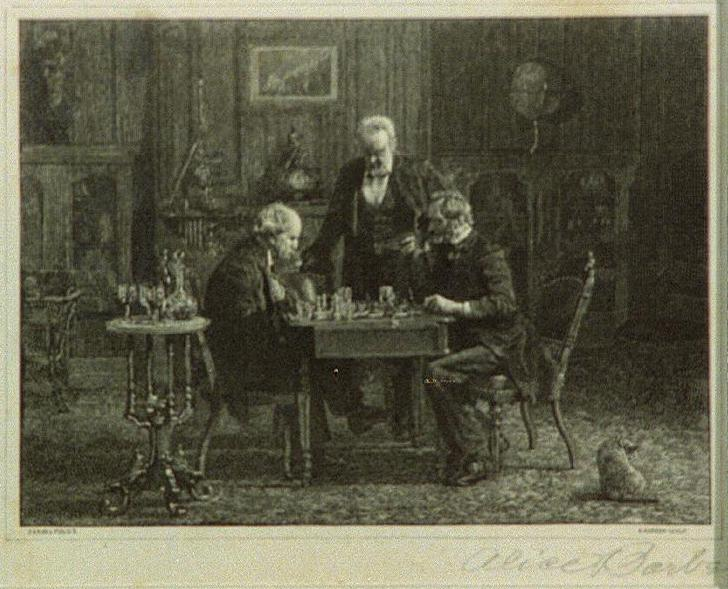
Engraving of The Chess Players by Thomas Eakins (circa 1880).

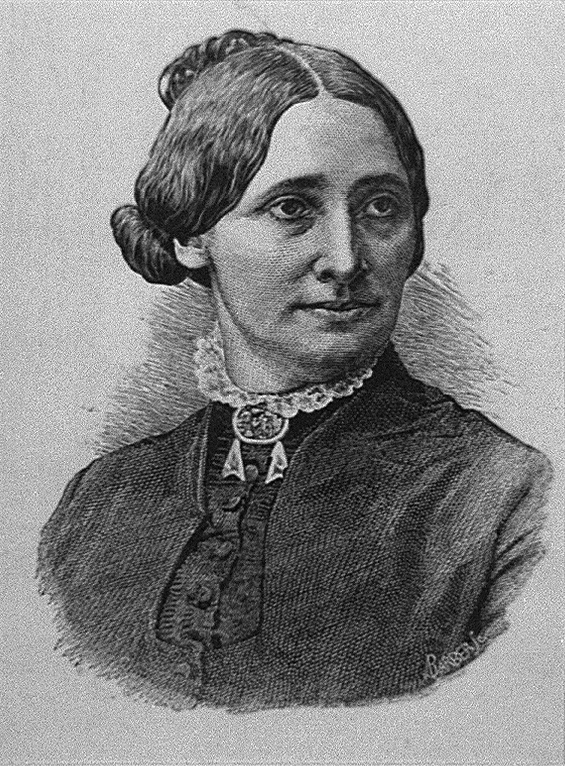
Engraving of First Lady Lucy Webb Hayes (circa 1880).

Their Perfume Flooded the House ink on board (1892)

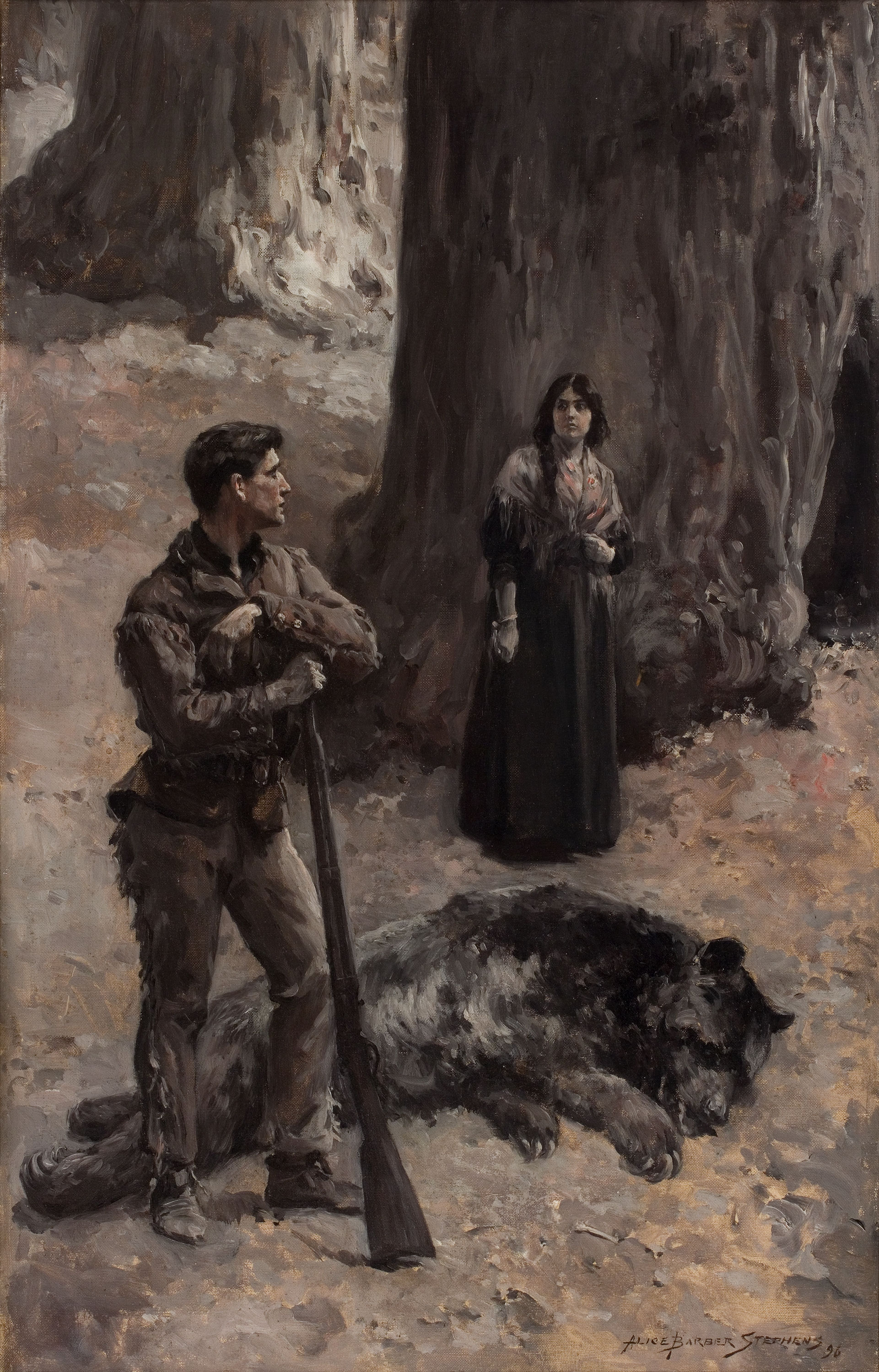
The Bear Hunter oil on canvas (1896)

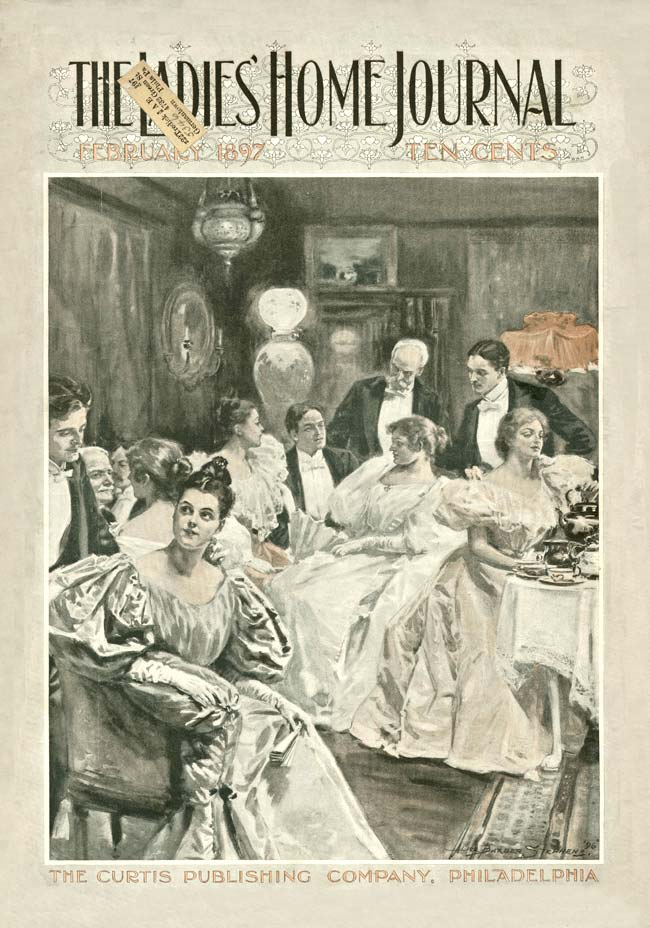
Ladies Homes Journal cover (February 1897)

John Wesley Teaching His Sunday School oil on canvas (1897)

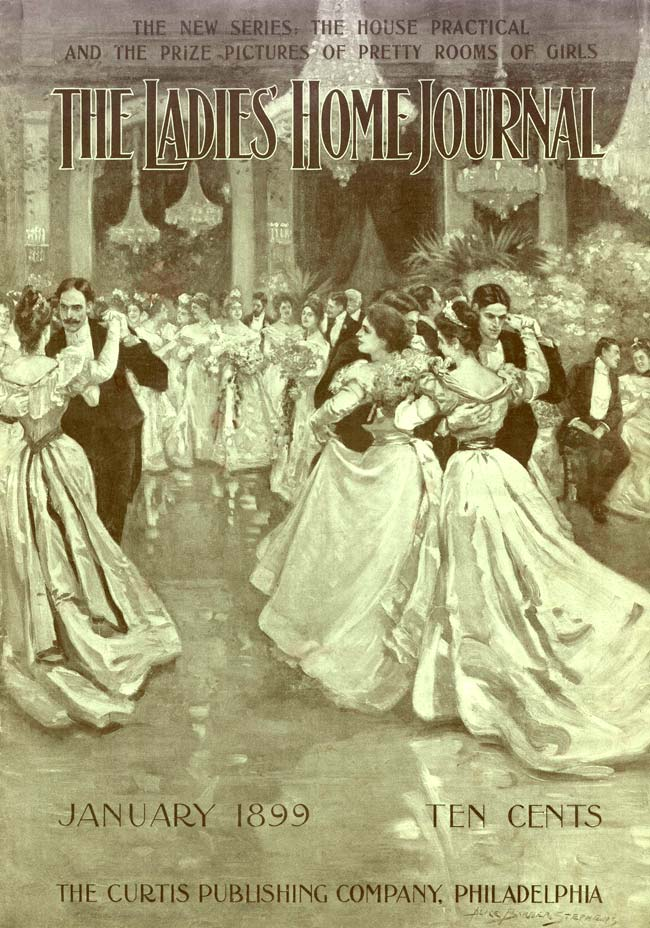
Ladies Home Journal cover (January 1899)

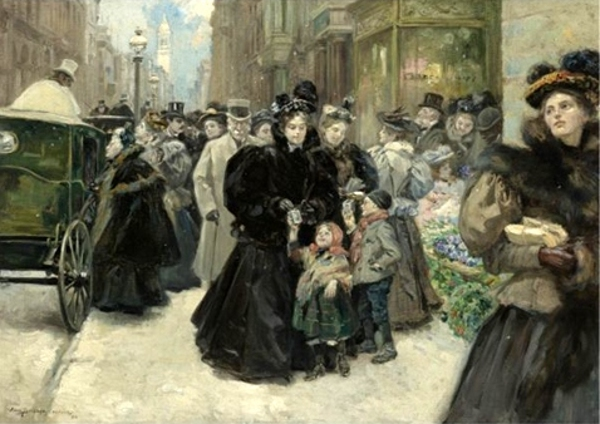
Christmas on Fifth Avenue (1896)
