= Natt =

Natt is a surname. Notable people with the surname include:

- Calvin Natt (born 1957), American basketball player in the National Basketball Association
- Chris Natt (born 1952), Australian politician and Australian rules footballer
- Kenny Natt (born 1958), American basketball player and coach, brother of Calvin Natt
- Phoebe Davis Natt (1848–1899), American painter
- Ted Natt (1941–1999), American publisher
