= Annie Traquair Lang =

American painter

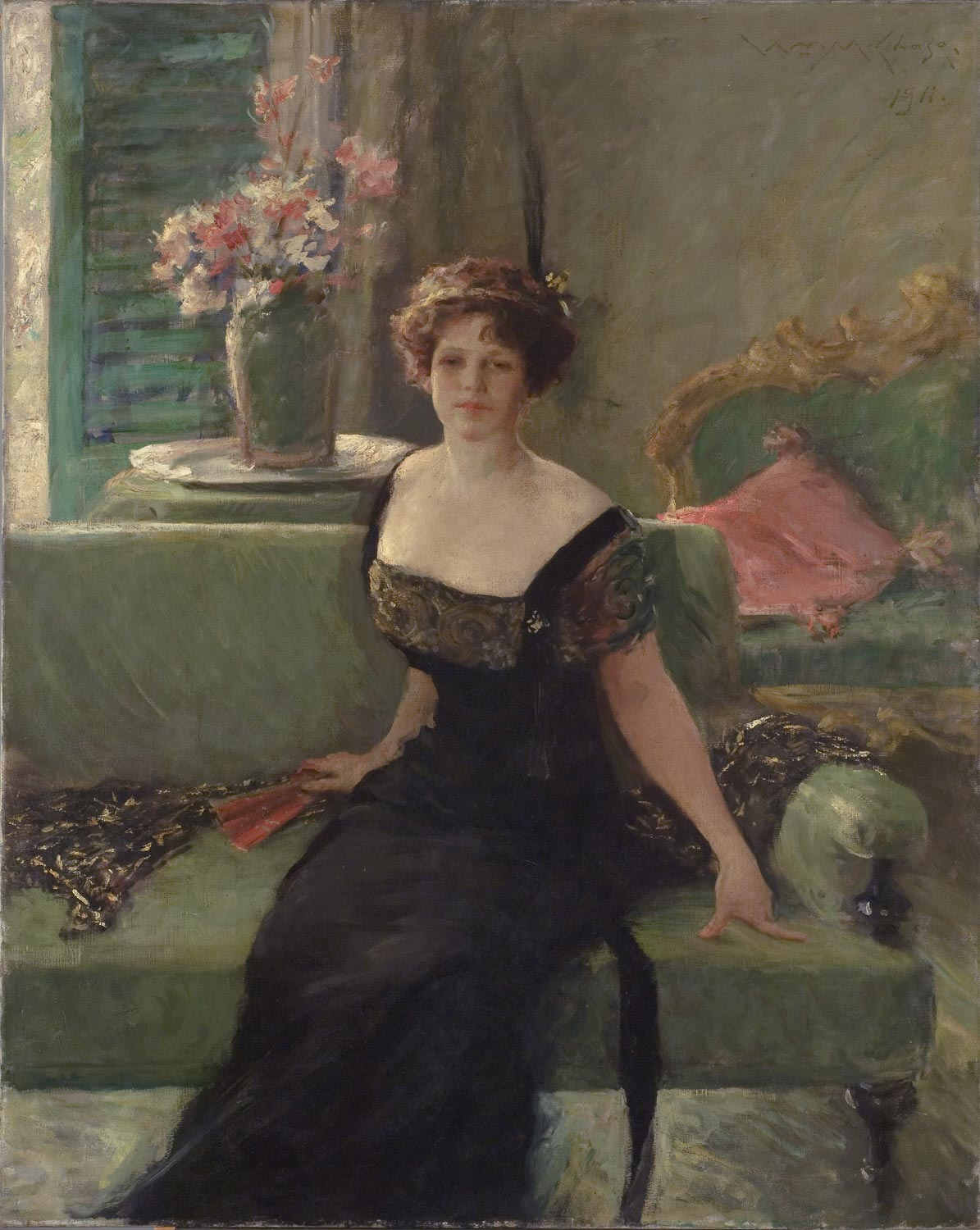
Portrait of Lang (1911) by William Merritt Chase

Annie Traquair Lang (September 8, 1885 – November 8, 1918) was an American Impressionist painter, known for experimental impasto brushstrokes and jewel-tone abstracted forms. She exhibited portraits, still lifes and landscapes at two dozen venues in Europe and the U.S., and institutions including the Metropolitan Museum of Art acquired her works. She was acclaimed in publications including the New York Times and The International Studio. She also earned praise for her collection of paintings by her mentor, William Merritt Chase, with whom she traveled in Europe and California. She was considered the Chase pupil "who best assimilated his technique and verve."

== Biography ==
Annie Lang was born in Philadelphia on September 8, 1885, the second eldest of seven children of the Philadelphia attorney James Traquair Lang (1858–1920) and Winona Barker Sewell Lang (1862–1928). Among her paternal ancestors were the stone carver James Traquair (1756–1811), who worked with the architect Benjamin Henry Latrobe; Thomas Traquair (1790–1824), a lieutenant in the War of 1812; and the engraver George Shortread Lang (1799–1877). Annie Lang studied at the Public Industrial Art School, the Philadelphia School of Design for Women, Chase's summer art school on Long Island in Southampton's Shinnecock Hills, and the Pennsylvania Academy of the Fine Arts, where she won scholarships for travel in Europe. Her teachers, in addition to Chase, included Elliot Daingerfield, Cecilia Beaux and Thomas Anshutz. Around 1911, she moved to Manhattan. She traveled widely during the summers, painting views of North Carolina, Venice, Florence, Bruges and Carmel, California. She posed for portraits by Chase (one belongs to the Philadelphia Museum of Art), and she painted him (one of her portraits of Chase hangs at the Metropolitan Museum). Among her other sitters were the arts educator J. Liberty Tadd, the artist Helen Thurlow, the actress Maude Adams, the writer Mary Hunter Austin and the painter and poet Countess Gabriella Fabbricotti.

Lang, although she was bereft after Chase's death in 1916 (she was his longtime mistress, according to her descendants), continued to paint overseas. In 1918, after a yearlong trip through Puerto Rico, Cuba and the Dominican Republic, Lang returned to New York with plans to volunteer at battlefield canteens in France. While preparing for the trip, she developed fatal bronchopneumonia (caused by the Spanish flu), and died on November 8.

== Achievements ==
At age 18, Annie Lang began displaying her artworks at Philadelphia venues including Wanamaker's flagship store (1903), the Art Club of Philadelphia (1904, 1907), Philadelphia Water Color Club (1907), American Art Society (1907), T Square Club (1908), and Pennsylvania Academy of the Fine Arts (1911, 1912). Her other Pennsylvania venues included the Carnegie International in Pittsburgh (1911, 1913, 1914) and the State Normal School in West Chester, Pa. (1915). In New York, she showed at the New York Water Color Club (1904), American Water Color Society (1907), Architectural League (1908), National Academy of Design (1912, 1914), National Arts Club (1917) and Knoedler galleries (1917). Knoedler also showed her collection of Chase's works. At the Panama-Pacific International Exposition (1915), she received a silver medal for her portraits of women in kimono and Venice views. Among her other U.S. venues were the Art Institute of Chicago (1912, 1913, 1916), Corcoran Gallery of Art (1912–1913), Muncie Art Association (1913), St. Louis Art Museum (1913) and Art Association of Richmond, Indiana (1913). The American Federation of Arts included her portrait of Chase in a traveling show (1913–1914). Overseas she exhibited at the Roman Art Exposition (1911) and the Anglo-American Exposition in London (1914).

In 1910, Chase predicted that her "remarkable ability" boded well for the future of American art. The New York Times praised her ability to execute "evanescent gradations of color with such authority." The International Studio ranked her acquisitions of Chase's paintings as "in all probability the finest private collection of his works in this country" and described her pictures as "very direct and forceful, painted in a virile manner." She worked alongside Chase at his summer schools in Florence (1910, 1911), Bruges (1912), Venice (1913), and Carmel, California (1914).

== Legacy ==
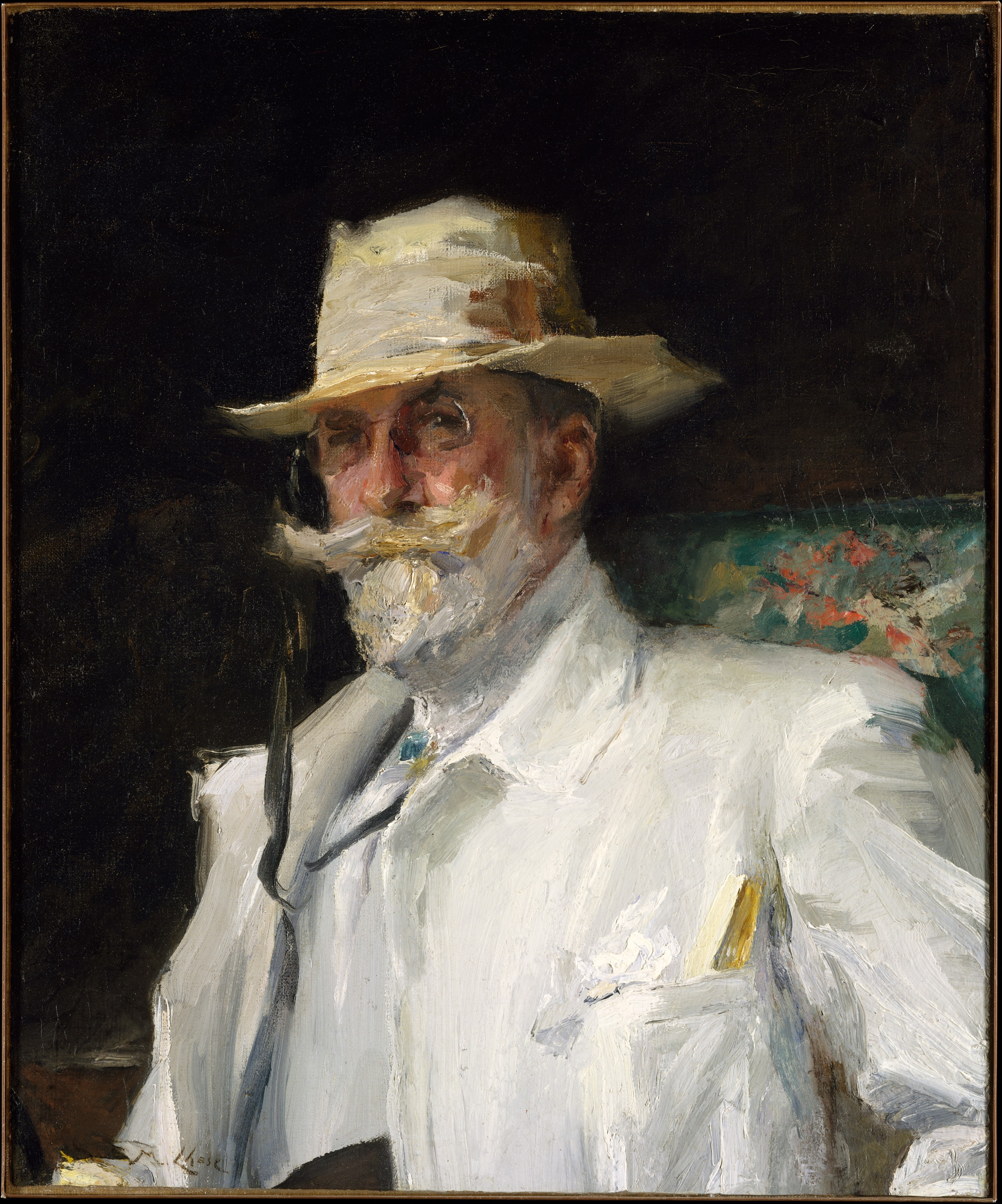
Portrait of William Merritt Chase, c. 1910, Metropolitan Museum of Art

=== Posthumous misattributions ===
In the 1920s, Lang's family sold her possessions and artworks. On a few of her paintings, including her portrait of Chase now at the Metropolitan Museum, her signature was cut away or erased and replaced with fraudulent Chase signatures. In the 1970s, the art historian Ronald G. Pisano identified a number of her works that had been misattributed to Chase. At the time, her portrait of her mentor was on exhibit and ranked among the important self-portraits in which painters "capture the essence of themselves." Pisano observed that the obliteration of her signatures "in such a wanton way is the ultimate crime that could be perpetrated against an artist."

=== Surviving works and papers ===
Institutions that own her paintings include Lancasterhistory.org (Japanese Print, portrait of Helen Thurlow, 1951.013), the Tweed Museum of Art in Duluth (Conversation in the Park, D62.x15), the Metropolitan Museum of Art (portrait of Chase, 1977.183.1), the Pennsylvania Academy of the Fine Arts (portrait of J. Liberty Tadd, 1944.22) and the Huntington Library, Art Collection, and Botanical Gardens (portrait of Mary Hunter Austin, AU 5464). The Huntington also owns a few of Lang's letters (AU 3451 and 3452), as does the Smithsonian's Archives of American Art (Carnegie Institute, Museum of Art records, correspondence, Box 73, folder 73.46, and Macbeth Gallery records, reel 2606, microfilmed).

Works by Chase that Lang collected include his portrait of the artist Baron Hugo von Habermann (Nelson-Atkins Museum of Art, 33–1599), Lady in Opera Cloak (Grand Rapids Art Museum, 1935.1.4), Self-Portrait (National Gallery of Art, 2014.136.15), and Still Life (Fish from the Adriatic) (Chrysler Museum of Art, 71.847). In 1913, the Met had acquired Portrait of a Lady in Black (Annie Traquair Lang) (Philadelphia Museum of Art, 1928-63-4) from Chase, but a few months after his death, his widow Alice reclaimed the painting and Lang later acquired it. Alice Chase replaced it at the Met with her husband's For the Little One (13.90), a portrait of herself sewing clothes for one of the couple's 13 children.

Five of Lang's paintings—the Tadd portrait; Tea Time Abroad (c. 1912); A Bit of Venice (1913); From Mr. Chase's Studio Window, Bruges, Belgium (c. 1912); and Isabella Lothrop (c. 1912)--have been featured in a Pennsylvania Academy of the Fine Arts show, Women in Motion: 150 Years of Women's Artistic Networks at PAFA (July 8, 2021 – July 24, 2022).
