= Anna Russell Jones =

American artist (1902–1995)

- Born: 1902; Jersey City, New Jersey, U.S.
- Died: April 3, 1995 (aged 92–93); Germantown, Pennsylvania, U.S.
- Known for: Graphic; carpet; textile design

Anna Russell Jones (1902, Jersey City, New Jersey – April 3, 1995, Germantown, Pennsylvania) was an African American artist known for her work in graphic, carpet, and textile design. Her papers are held at the African American Museum in Philadelphia.

== Education ==
Anna Russell Jones was the first African American woman to receive a four-year scholarship from the Philadelphia Board of Education and the first African American graduate of the Philadelphia School of Design for Women (PSDW), now Moore College of Art & Design. Her educational achievements marked the beginning of a life that not only challenged but also transcended the racial myths, stereotypes, and abject definitions of blackness and Black life that pervaded 20th century America.

== Career ==
After earning her degree in textile design at PSDW, Anna Russell Jones worked as a textile designer for a carpet design studio, James G. Speck Studio, in Philadelphia for four years. She opened her own studio in 1928 and sold her carpet and wallpaper designs to firms in Philadelphia, New York and Canada in the 1920s and 1930s.

She was the first African American woman from Philadelphia to join the U.S. Army, serving as a member of the Women's Army Auxiliary Corps (later the Women's Army Corps), during World War II. Jones was stationed in Arizona, where she did graphic design work for Army publications and earned multiple awards.

After the war ended, Jones returned to Philadelphia for graduate work in textile work at PSDW, and subsequently studied medical illustration at Howard University in Washington, D.C. She was employed as a practical nurse at Hahnemann Hospital in Philadelphia and then with the civil service as a medical illustrator and graphic designer. Jones continued to do freelance artwork throughout the remainder of her life.

In 1987 Anna Russell Jones was given the honorary degree Doctor of Fine Arts from Moore College of Art and Design.

== Historical context ==
As Nina de Angeli Walls suggests in her book Art, Industry, and Women’s Education in Philadelphia, “Profound changes occurred in art training and careers for women in the visual arts between the mid-Victorian and the modern eras, paralleling the revolution in women’s education and access to professions that occurred in other fields.” Anna Russell Jones’ time at PSDW was circumscribed by those very same dimensions of early 20th century norms and gendered social order. As Walls points out in her narrative, “The school remained all-white through the early twentieth century; this policy was made explicit in the Moore Institute charter from 1932 until after 1945. The only recorded exception to this was the school’s first African-American graduate, Anna Russell.”

Notwithstanding the racist, patriarchal, and paternalist attitudes that often accompanied the allocation and distribution of scholarship funds, the philanthropic spirit of the period opened up many avenues for Black and African American populations of America's urban manufacturing and industrial cities such as Philadelphia to obtain the financial means of pursuing the ends of social and class mobility through education.

Available financial aid, historically a variable factor, had a great influence on the nature of the study body. After 1900, growing demand throughout the city for secondary education induced the Board of Education to build additional high schools. In 1909, the newly built William Penn General High School was added to the list of schools whose graduates qualified for art school scholarships, along with Germantown High School and West Philadelphia High School after 1915. Between 1910 and 1920 a high school education became far more accessible to large numbers of city resident. In the 1920s, recipients of scholarships allocated by the Board of Education and the mayor's office were often recruited by School of Design graduates installed as art teachers in the city high schools. Despite outreach efforts to other neighborhoods, most scholarship students through the 1920s came from the same North and West Philadelphia neighborhoods described above..

A significant amount of the history and scholarship concerning black life and industrial education during the late 19th and early 20th centuries have focused on the activities of black male figures such as Booker T. Washington who is best known for his influence on southern race relations as well as the founding of the Tuskegee Normal and Industrial Institute in Tuskegee, Alabama. However, through a practice of black feminist thinking and writing, scholars such as Jaqueline Jones, Tera Hunter, and Paula Giddings have effectively shifted the focus on industrial education and self-making from the more dominant narratives of white feminism and black male leadership to critical accounts that place black women at the center of the work. Most recently, Farah Jasmine Griffin's Harlem Nocturne: Women Artist and Progressive Politics During World War II and Terrion L. Williamson's Scandalize My Name: Black Feminist Practice and the Making of Black Social Life have both provided theoretical frameworks for recovering, studying, and advancing the many vestiges of black women's contribution to the social fabric and cultural landscape of the United States.
