= Phebe Westcott Humphreys =

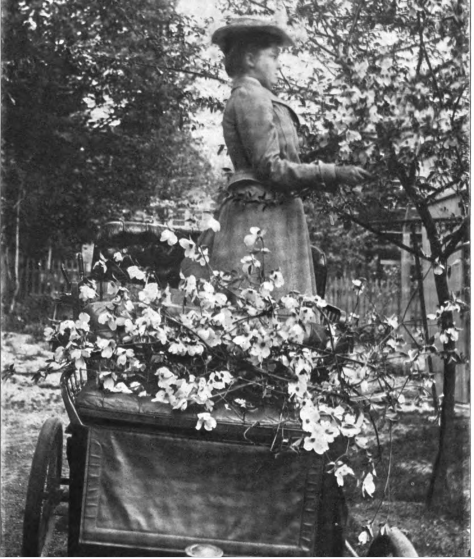
Phebe Westcott Humphreys gathering botanical samples in her Rambler car, from Floral Life magazine, June 1903

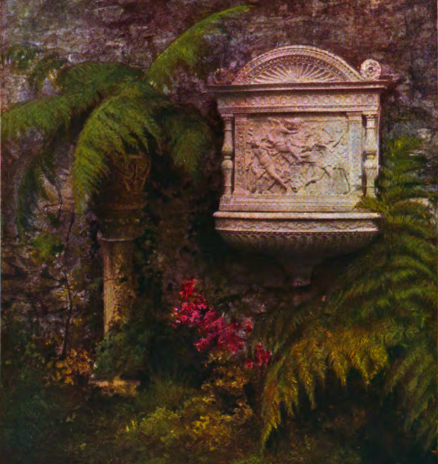
A wall fountain shown in Phebe Westcott Humphreys' The Practical Book of Garden Architecture (Philadelphia: J. B. Lippincott Co., 1914)

Phebe Westcott Humphreys (January 28, 1864 – June 17, 1939) was an American journalist, horticulturist, photographer and children's book author, known for documenting and influencing landscape design with publications including The Practical Book of Garden Architecture (Philadelphia: J. B. Lippincott Co., 1914).

Her work was favored by experts including the botanist Charles Howard Shinn, who lauded Humphreys' "amazing wealth of knowledge," and the tastemaker Ruby Ross Wood. Humphreys contributed about 400 feature articles and regular columns to periodicals including House and Garden and Harper's Bazar. Among her topics are farms and factories run by immigrants; architectural preservation work; environmental sustainability; philanthropies donating plants to the poor; and newly patented household appliances. Her pioneering guidebook for car travelers, The Automobile Tourist (Philadelphia: Ferris & Leach, 1905), was praised by The Philadelphia Inquirer for "most thorough information" provided by "an enthusiastic automobilist."

In 2020, the Cultural Landscape Foundation designated her a pioneer.

== Biography ==
Humphreys was the youngest of three children of Enos Westcott (c. 1835-1865), a farmer, metalsmith and shopkeeper in Bridgeton, New Jersey, and Lydia Martha Mason (1837-1931). Enos was considered "a liberal-hearted clever fellow." In 1869, Lydia remarried to Ephraim Bacon (1821-1909), a farmer. Humphreys attended the South Jersey Institute and the Philadelphia School of Design for Women. (Humphreys' niece Mary Bacon became the Bridgeton hospital's first woman physician.) In 1887, she married Samuel Walter Humphreys (1864-1932), who ran food companies including Puritan Preserving Co., Franklin Conserve Co., Humphreys Candy Corp. and Colonial Conserve Co. The couple lived at 424 East Woodlawn Street in Germantown and had one child, Walter Westcott Humphreys (1888-1952), who became known for his car driving skills by age 12.

Around 1891, Humphreys started writing magazine columns, often describing how she shaped plantings at her suburban property. She also based articles on her son's interests including photography and camping. She took photographs accompanying her stories (her husband contributed as well). Her children's books about nature were inspired by memories of her childhood farm life and the lack of youth-tailored literature on the subject. In 1899, the Humphreys family started traveling widely by car—she called herself "the chauffeur naturalist." On their trips overseas, she wrote about landscapes and architecture in Cherbourg, Nova Scotia and Bermuda.

By 1920, she had largely stopped publishing her writings, although she continued to produce manuscripts and belonged to the National League of American Pen Women. She and her husband owned substantial real estate. In 1934, she donated a seaside property in Stone Harbor, New Jersey, to a boys' harmonica club run by the philanthropist Albert N. Hoxie Jr., the founder of the Philadelphia Harmonica Band. She died after being struck by a trolley on East Girard Avenue. She is buried alongside her husband in West Laurel Hill Cemetery, Bala Cynwyd, Pennsylvania.

== Works ==
Magazines that published Humphreys' articles include American Homes and Gardens (1906-1912), American Kitchen (1899), American Motherhood (1900-1907), Arthur's Home Magazine (1892-1895), Birds and Nature (1900-1907), Booklovers (1904), Country Gentleman] (1900-1919), Country Life in America (1912-1913), The Delineator (1899-1901), Demorest's Family Magazine (1899-1900), The Designer and the Woman's Magazine (1900-1904), Farm and Fireside (1899-1919), Farm and Home (1907-1908), Floral Life (1903-1908), Garden Magazine (1905), Good Housekeeping (1897-1905), Harper's Bazar (1899), Home Queen (1895-1897), House Beautiful (1906-1914), House and Garden (1903-1910), Household (1900), Housekeeper (1905), Ladies' Home Journal (1893-1908), Ledger Monthly (1899-1902), Mayflower (1893-1900, published by John Lewis Childs), Park's Floral Magazine (1893-1900), Pictorial Review (1904), Puritan (1899), Rambler Magazine (1905), St. Nicholas (1904), Strand Magazine (1903), Suburban Life (1907-1911), Success With Flowers (1891-1901), Table Talk (1899-1914), What to Eat (1899) and Woman's Home Companion (1899-1900). Newspapers ran syndicated versions of her magazine stories, and The Times in Philadelphia (1892-1894) published her gardening articles.

Floral Life editors reported that the publication "has no more popular contributor" than Humphreys, and The Delineator's Charles Hanson Towne lauded "her sane view of things." Creating harmonious landscapes, experimenting with newly imported houseplants and protecting indigenous species were recurring themes, for instance in her regular columns for Success With Flowers and Arthur's Home Magazine. Among her other frequent topics were nurturing children's curiosity; life on houseboats; and connecting the urban poor with nature. In a five-year monthly series for the culinary magazine Table Talk, titled "Famous Banqueting Houses," she explored the history, architecture and preservation of landmark buildings mostly around Philadelphia, such as the Germantown White House, Grumblethorpe and Andalusia, and as far afield as Maine, Trenton and Salem.

Her children's books about nature, Our Animal Friends in Their Native Homes (Philadelphia, 1900) and Our Feathered Friends (Chicago: Thompson & Thomas, 1905), "describe accurately" the fauna and their habitats, Publishers' Weekly reported. Her other children's books include What Boys and Girls Like (Philadelphia, 1899 and 1903) and ABC's and Stories for Mamma's Little Sweetheart (Philadelphia, 1899). Her 1905 book, The Automobile Tourist, suggests sightseeing routes around Philadelphia, based on her own years of driving and studying what she described as "alluring byways, and places of unsuspected delights."

Her 1914 book, The Practical Book of Garden Architecture, was praised for its artistic yet realizable projects in periodicals including Architecture, Arts and Decoration, Literary Digest, Living Age and Town & Country. The Boston Globe called it "a treasure indeed" for garden owners and designers. Publishers' Weekly noted that the book's surprising ideas could create scenery where "you half expect to find in some big tree a door leading into fairyland."

== Photographs ==
The Historical Society of Pennsylvania owns about 200 of Humphreys' landscape and workplace photos including images of women employed at canneries, invalid children at seashore retreats and African-Americans preparing shad. The Germantown Historical Society has some of her photos from the early 1900s including depictions of 18th-century churches and residences in Germantown.
