= Bessie Pease Gutmann =

American painter (1876–1960)

- Born: Bessie Collins Pease; April 8, 1876; Philadelphia, Pennsylvania, US
- Died: September 29, 1960 (aged 84); Centerport, New York
- Education: Philadelphia School of Design for Women; Parsons School of Design
- Known for: Illustration
- Spouse: Hellmuth Gutmann
- Children: 3

Bessie Pease Gutmann (1876 – 1960) was an American artist and illustrator, most noted for her paintings of putti, infants, and young children. During the early 1900s she was one of the better-known magazine and book illustrators in the United States. Her artwork was featured on 22 magazine covers such as Woman's Home Companion and McCall's between 1906 and 1920. She also illustrated popular children's books including a notable 1907 edition of Alice's Adventures in Wonderland. Although the commercial popularity of Gutmann's art declined during World War II, there was renewed interest in her illustrations from collectors by the late 20th century.

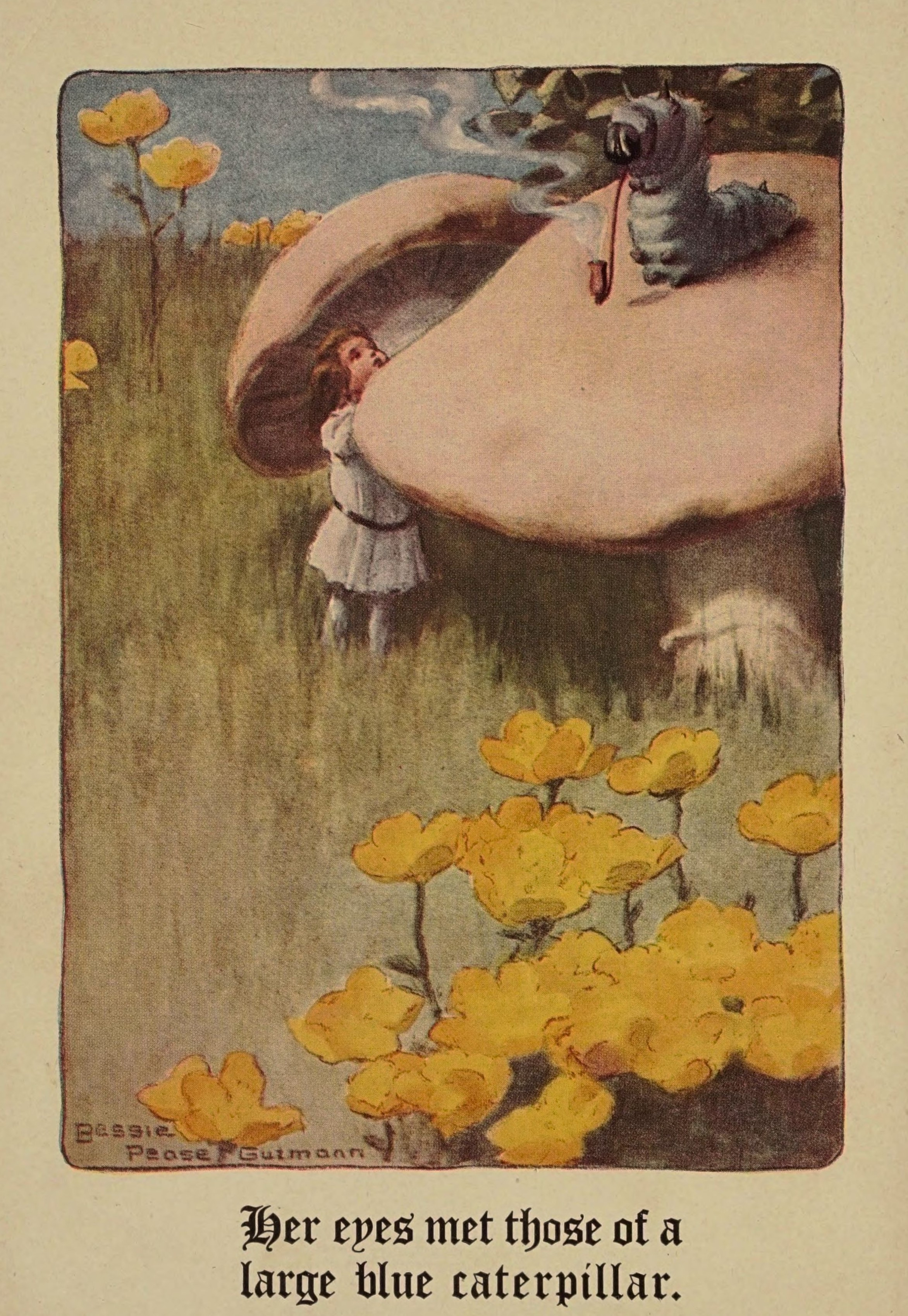
A page illustration from the 1907 edition of Alice's Adventures in Wonderland

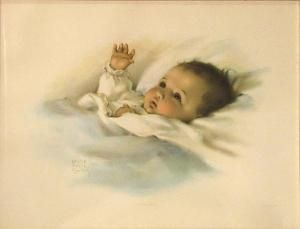
Awakening (1918)

== Early life and education ==
Gutmann was born Bessie Collins Pease on April 8, 1876, in Philadelphia, Pennsylvania, the daughter of Horace Collins Pease and Margaretta Pease (née Young). She was raised in Mount Holly, New Jersey. After graduating from high school, Gutmann studied at the Philadelphia School of Design for Women. From 1896 to 1898, she attended the New York School of Art (later Parsons, The New School), and attended the Art Students League of New York from 1899 to 1901.

== Career ==
Gutmann initially worked as an independent commercial artist drawing portraits and newspapers advertisements. In 1903, she gained employment with the publishing firm of Gutmann & Gutmann which specialized in fine art prints. The first children's book she illustrated was a 1905 edition of A Child's Garden of Verses by Robert Louis Stevenson. Gutmann illustrated several more books including a notable 1907 version of Lewis Carroll's Alice's Adventures in Wonderland. She also created artwork for postcards and calendars, and her art adorned 22 magazine covers for McCall's, Collier's, Woman's Home Companion, and Pictorial Review, among others. Her greatest recognition came from a series of hand-colored prints which highlighted the innocence of young children. Two of her most notable works were A Little Bit of Heaven and The Awakening which both focused on the face and hands of an infant tucked under a blanket. Gutmann's work was popular through the 1920s but interest in her style declined before World War II. Due to failing eyesight, she retired from drawing in 1947.

== Personal life ==
In 1906, she married Hellmuth Gutmann, one of the brothers who co-owned the publishing firm where she was employed. The couple lived in South Orange, New Jersey, and spent summers at a home in Island Heights, New Jersey. They had three children, Alice, Lucille, and John, who became the models for her illustrations.

She died on September 29, 1960, in Centerport, New York, at the age of 84.

== Illustrated works ==
=== Original editions ===
As Bessie Collins Pease:

- Robert Louis Stevenson, A Child's Garden of Verses, New York: Dodge Publishing Co. (1905), OCLC 12388963
- Edmund Vance Cooke, "The Biography of our Baby", Dodge (1906) OCLC 16631992

As Bessie Pease Gutmann:

- Edith Dunham The Diary of a Mouse, Dodge (1907), OCLC 7782667
- Lewis Carroll, Alice's Adventures in Wonderland, Dodge (1907) OCLC 8072979; reissued New York: Children's Classics, Crown (1988), ISBN 0-517-65961-1
- Lewis Carroll, Through the Looking-Glass, and What Alice Found There, Dodge (1909), OCLC 1985760
- Bessie Pease Gutmann, Golden Hours, New York: Hurst & Co. (1912), OCLC 52420265

=== Posthumous collections ===
- Nursery Songs & Lullabies, New York : Grosset & Dunlap (1990) ISBN 0-448-23457-2
- Nursery Poems & Prayers, Grosset & Dunlap (1990) ISBN 0-448-23458-0
- I Love You: Verses & Sweet Sayings, Grosset & Dunlap (1991) ISBN 0-448-40143-6
- My Sweet Girl, Eugene, Ore.: Harvest House (2005) ISBN 0-7369-1516-8
