= Katherine Levin Farrell =

American artist (1857–1951)

- Born: Katherine Levin; March 15, 1857; Philadelphia, Pennsylvania, United States
- Died: 1951 (aged 93–94); United States
- Education: Philadelphia School of Design for Women; Pennsylvania Academy of the Fine Arts; Philadelphia Museum School of Art; Drexel Institute
- Occupation: Visual artist
- Known for: Painter, printmaker
- Spouse: Theodore Phillips Farrell (m. 1888–)

Katherine Levin Farrell (1857–1951) was an American visual artist, known for her paintings and etchings.

== Biography ==
Katherine Levin was born on March 15, 1857, in Philadelphia. She was the daughter of Ludwika (née Levin) and S.H. Farrell. In 1888, she married Theodore Phillips Farrell.

She studied at the Philadelphia School of Design for Women, the Pennsylvania Academy of the Fine Arts (PAFA), the Philadelphia Museum School of Art, and the Drexel Institute. She studied with Thomas Eakins at PAFA.

Farrell exhibited her work at the Pennsylvania Building and the Woman's Building at the 1893 World's Columbian Exposition in Chicago, Illinois. She also exhibited her work at the Boston Art Club, the Brooklyn Art Association, and the National Academy of Design. In 1938 the Philadelphia Art Alliance held a one-woman show of her work.

Farell was a member of The Plastic Club in Philadelphia and the Brooklyn Art Association in New York.

Farrell died in 1951. Her work is in the collection of the Pennsylvania Academy of the Fine Arts.
