= Charlotte Harding =

American illustrator (1873–1951)

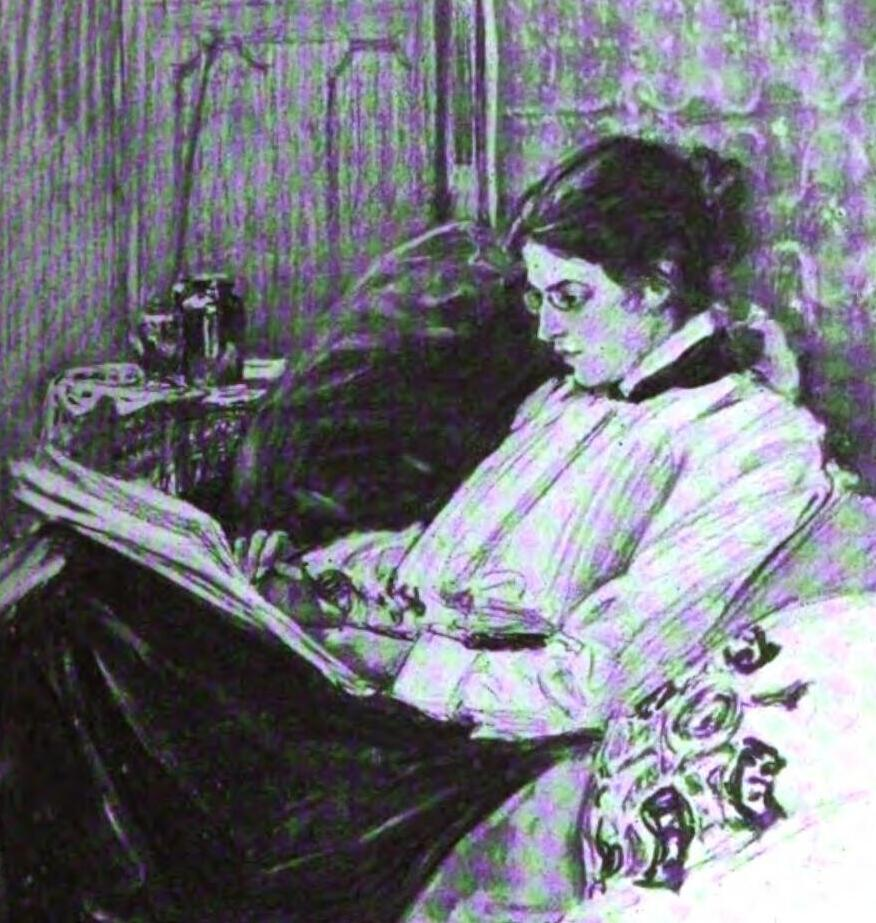
- portrait by Alice Barber Stephens
- Born: August 31, 1873; Newark, New Jersey
- Died: November 1, 1951 (aged 78); Smithtown, New York
- Education: Philadelphia School of Design for Women; Pennsylvania Academy of the Fine Arts; Drexel Institute of Illustration
- Known for: Book and magazine illustrations
- Spouse: James A. Brown
- Awards: Philadelphia School of Design for Women George W. Childs Gold Medal 1893–1894; Philadelphia School of Design for Women Horstman Fellowship 1893–1894; Woman's Exposition in London Silver Medal 1900; St. Louis Exposition Medal 1915

Charlotte Harding (1873–1951) was an American illustrator. She signed her work with her maiden name, but her name in her personal life was Charlotte Harding Brown after she married James A. Brown in 1905. She illustrated magazines, such as The Saturday Evening Post and Harper's Bazaar, and books such as Robin Hood.

== Early life ==
Harding was born in Newark, New Jersey, on August 31, 1873, the daughter of Joseph and Charlotte Elizabeth Harding. Harding lived in Philadelphia beginning in 1880 and attended public schools there. Her younger brother, George Matthews Harding, also became an artist and illustrator.

== Education ==
Harding studied from 1893 to 1894 under Robert Henri at the Philadelphia School of Design for Women, where she won the George W. Childs gold medal and the Horstman Fellowship. The following year she was an instructor at the school. She received a fellowship and continued her studies at the Pennsylvania Academy of the Fine Arts from 1894 to 1895 and under Howard Pyle at the Drexel Institute of Illustration from 1894 to 1900. Harding is identified as one of Pyle's first and noted students. Her works were exhibited at Drexel in 1897 and 1898, one of which was commissioned for a manuscript.

== Career ==
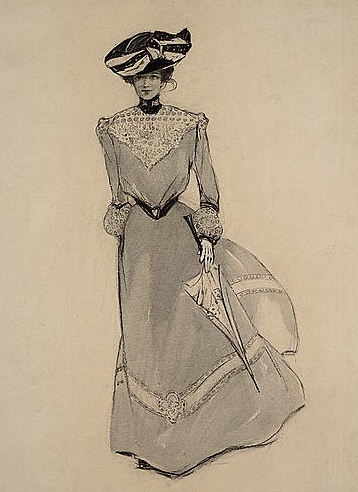
A 'quick change' for the rest of the afternoon, circa 1901; charcoal, wash, and opaque white on layered paper; published in "Our Foolish Virgins" by Eliot Gregory, The Century Magazine, November 1901

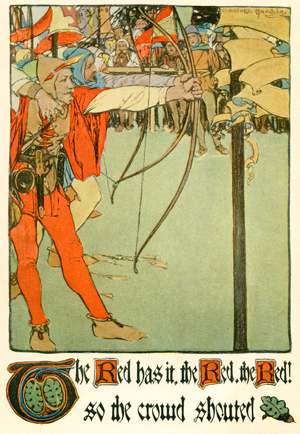
Frontispiece for Robin Hood by Eva March Tappan, ca. 1903

After she completed her studies at Drexel, Harding set up a studio in Philadelphia with Alice Barber Stephens. Harding illustrated for a number of magazines, including Good Housekeeping, Harper's Bazaar, The Ladies' Home Journal, McClure's Magazine, The Saturday Evening Post, and The Century Magazine.

She was one of the artists to contribute to the Golden Age of Illustration (1890–1920). Other women who made significant contributions to the movement and illustrated "important British and American books", according to author Catherine Golden, were Jessie Willcox Smith, Elizabeth Shippen Green, and Violet Oakley. Harding's illustration, Algy, was made for a poem about a boy who would rather have kisses from his mother than the family dog.

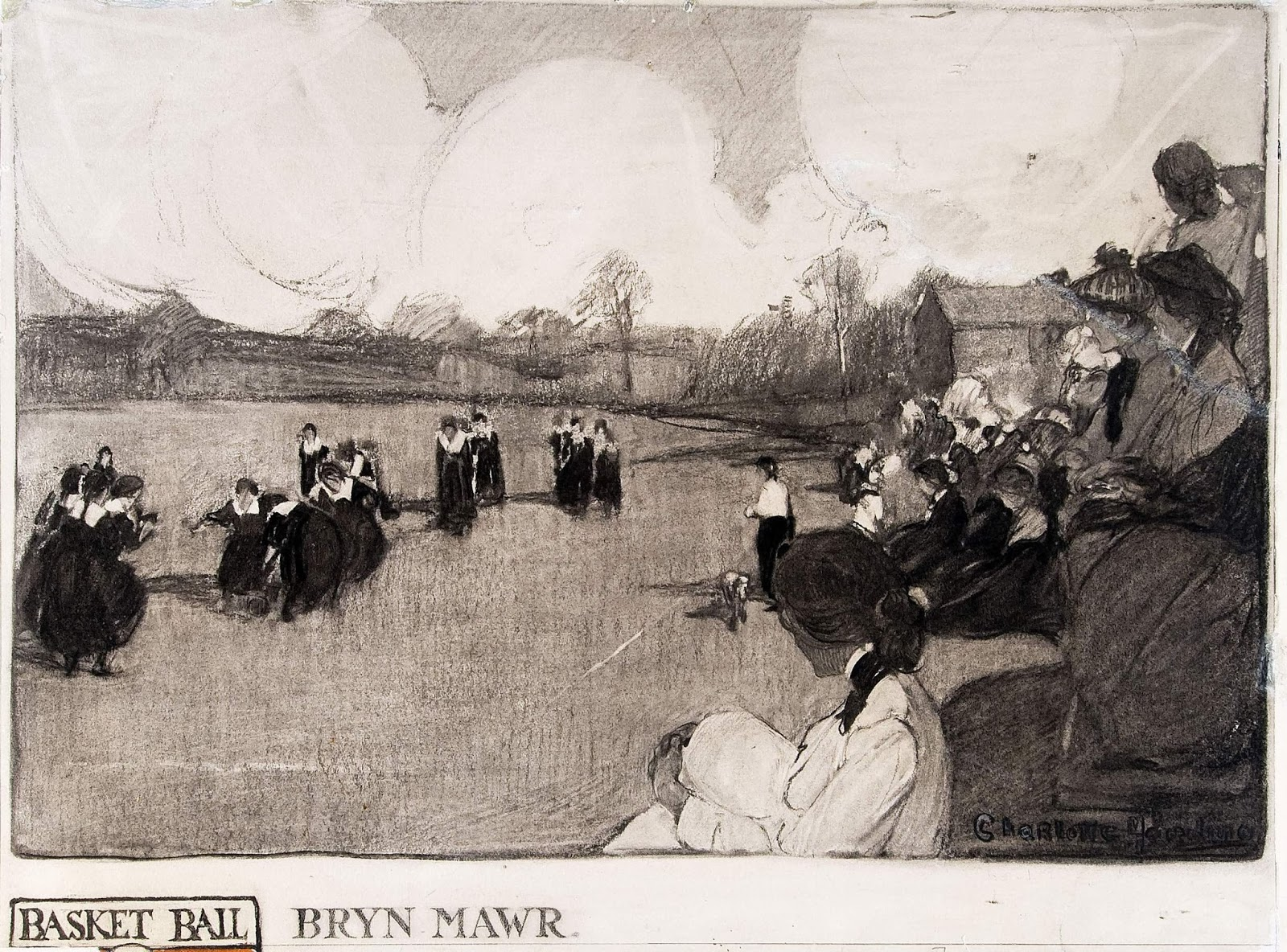
Basket Ball, Bryn Mawr, 1903. Illustration for Alice Katherine Fallows, "Athletics for College Girls", Century, May 1903, Brandywine River Museum.

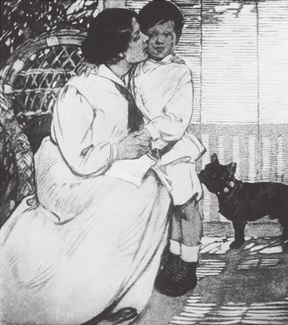
Algy, 1905. Illustration for Helen Hay Whitney, Verses for Jock and Joan, The Hyde Collection, Glens Falls, New York

Harding was a founding member of The Plastic Club in 1897 and was a member there until 1913 and was a member of the Philadelphia Watercolor Club. In 1900 she received silver medals at the Woman's Exposition in London and received honors and prizes at the 1915 St. Louis Exposition and other exhibitions. She continued to sign her works "Carolyn Harding" after her marriage in 1905. She had a studio and lived in Holmesburg, Philadelphia. Harding stopped illustrating in 1917.

== Personal life ==
Harding married James Adams Brown, an engineer, in 1905. She died on November 1, 1951, in Smithtown, New York. They had a daughter, Charlotte Adams Brown.

== Works ==
- Francis Neilson (1901). Madame Bohemia. Charlotte Harding, illustrator. Philadelphia: J.B. Lippincott Company. LCCN 00006439.
- Margaret Howard Peterson (1901). The Potter and the Clay: A Romance of Today. Charlotte Harding, illustrator. Boston: Lothrop Publishing Company. LCCN 01031912.
- Eva March Tappan (1903). Robin Hood: His Book. Charlotte Harding, illustrator. Boston: Little, Brown & Company. LCCN 03026880.
- Hildegard Brooks (1904). Daughters of Desperation. Charlotte Harding, illustrator. Edinburgh & London: McClure, Philip and Company. LCCN 04008707.
- Elizabeth Garver Jordan (1904). May Iverson—Her Book. Charlotte Harding, illustrator. New York and London: Harper and Brothers. LCCN 04029183.
- Helen Hay Whitney (1905). Verses for Jock and Joan. Charlotte Harding, illustrator. New York: Fox, Duffield and Company. LCCN 05033917.
- Mary Raymond Shipman Andrews (1906). A Good Samaritan. Charlotte Harding, illustrator. New York: McClure, Philip and Company. LCCN 06035945.
- Helen Hay Whitney (1906). Punch and Judy. Charlotte Harding, illustrator. New York: Duffield. LCCN 07025150.
- Helen Reimensnyder Martin (1907). The Betrothal of Elypholate and Other Tales of the Pennsylvania Dutch. Charlotte Harding and Alice Barber Stephens, illustrators. New York: The Century Company. LCCN 07030437.
- William Dean Howells (1908). Fennel and Rue: A Novel. Charlotte Harding, illustrator. New York and London: Harper & Brothers. LCCN 08009174.
- Joel Chandler Harris (1909). The Bishop and the Bogie-Man. Charlotte Harding, illustrator. London: Doubleday, Page and Company. LCCN 09003878.
- Jean Webster (1909). Much Ado about Peter. Charlotte Harding and Harry Linnell, illustrators. London; New York: Doubleday, Page & Company. LCCN 09007143.
