= Philadelphia School of Design for Women =

Former art school for women in Philadelphia, Pennsylvania

Coordinates: 39.974292°N 75.159275°W

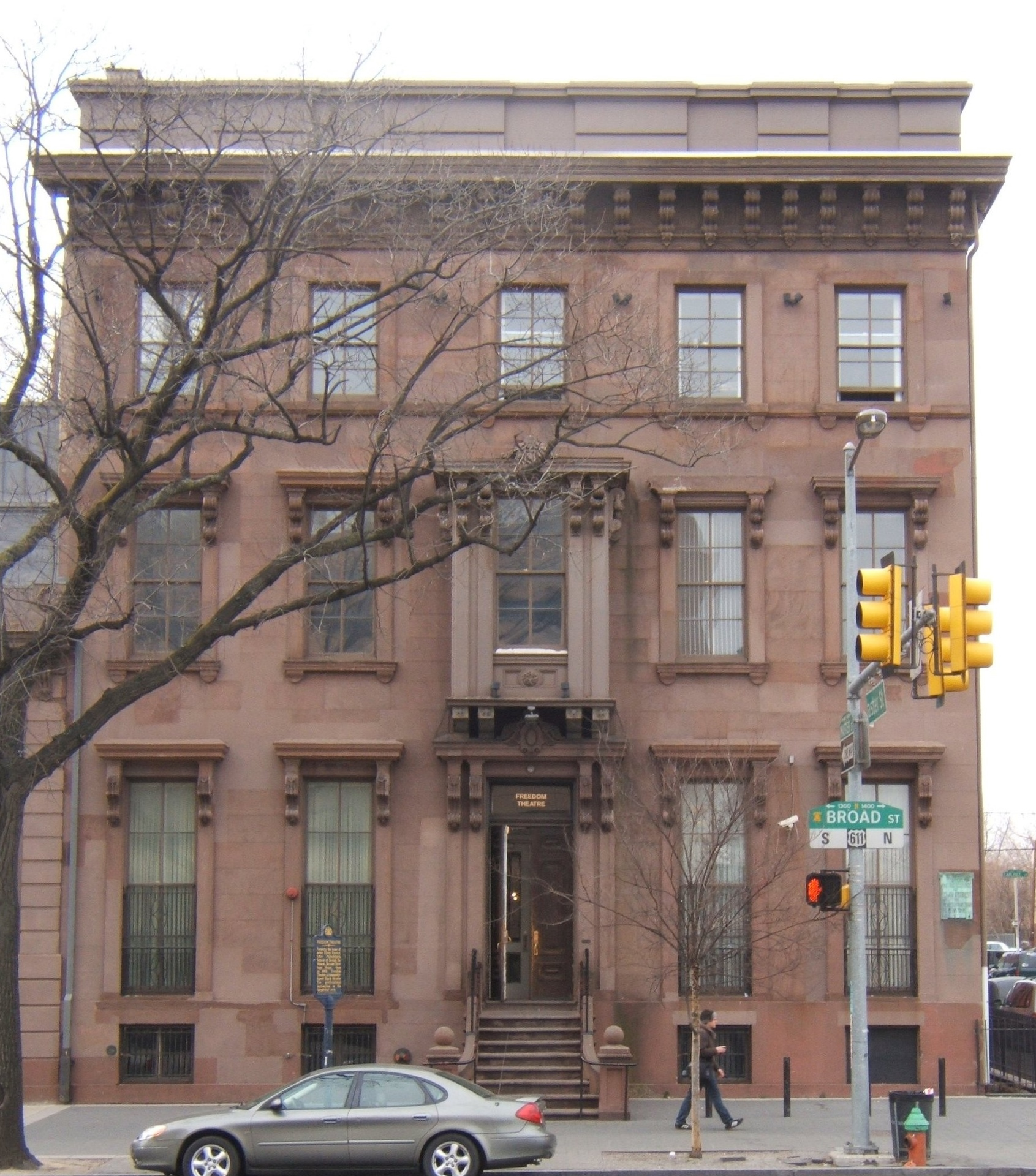
Edwin Forrest House was home to the Philadelphia School of Design for Women from 1880 to 1959. Since 1968, it has housed the Freedom Theatre.

The Philadelphia School of Design for Women was an art school for women in Philadelphia, Pennsylvania. Housed in the former Edwin Forrest House at 1346 North Broad Street, under the directorship of Emily Sartain (1886–1920), it became the largest art school for women in the United States. Its faculty included Robert Henri, Samuel Murray and Daniel Garber. In 1932, it merged into what is now the Moore College of Art and Design.

== History ==
=== 19th century ===
Sarah Worthington King Peter, wife of the British consul in Philadelphia, established an industrial arts school in her home in 1848 to teach women without a means of supporting themselves a trade. The school taught lithography, wood carving, and design, such as for household items like carpets and wallpaper. Peter's husband died soon after she established the school and she returned to her Cincinnati, Ohio home.

In 1850, Peter wrote to the Franklin Institute about her drawing class of some 20 young women becoming a "co-operative, but separate branch" of the institute. The Franklin Institute established and supervised the Philadelphia School of Design for Women from 1850 to 1853. A group of 17 men were designated the incorporators of the school in 1853. Elliott Cresson was among these 17 directors, and was elected president at the first meeting. Scientific illustrator Helen Elizabeth Lawson was appointed to the position of secretary of the school. It was the country's largest art school for women and its students included Emily Sartain, Jessie Willcox Smith, Alice Barber Stephens, Elizabeth Shippen Green, Annie Traquair Lang and Alice Neel.

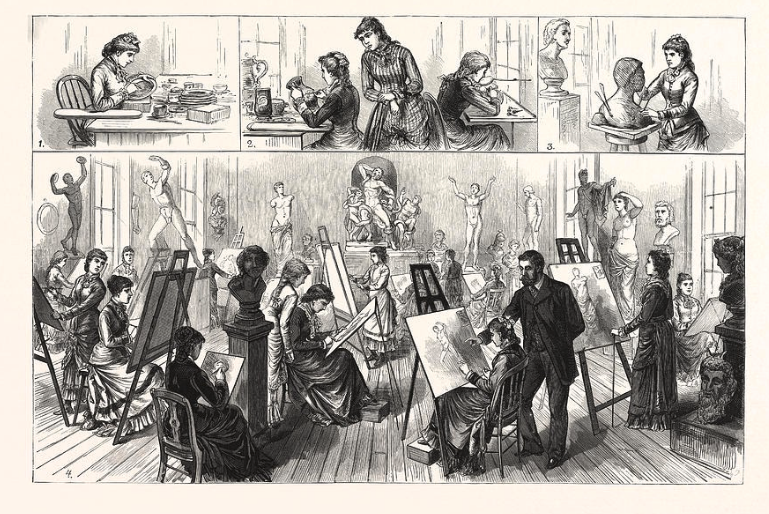
Classes at the Philadelphia School of Design for Women in 1880

The first principal of the school was Anne Hill, who held the position from 1850 to 1852. She was followed by the artist Thomas Braidwood (1855-1873), who probably left due to disagreements with John Sartain, who served as Director of the school for 28 years. Elizabeth Croasdale took over as principal from 1873 to 1886, followed by Sartain's daughter Emily Sartain from 1886 to 1920.

In 1875, the school's prospectus lists its faculty as including Charles Page, Teacher of Designing, Modelling, and Lithography; Peter Moran, Teacher of Landscape Painting in Oil and Water Colors; Stephen J. Ferris, Teacher of Drawing the Human Figure and Painting from the Antique and from Life; John Dalziel, Teacher of Wood Engraving; Rebecca N. Trump, Teacher of Free-hand Drawing and Flower Painting from Nature; and Sophia Freedley, Teacher of Object Drawing with Practical Perspective.

=== 20th century ===
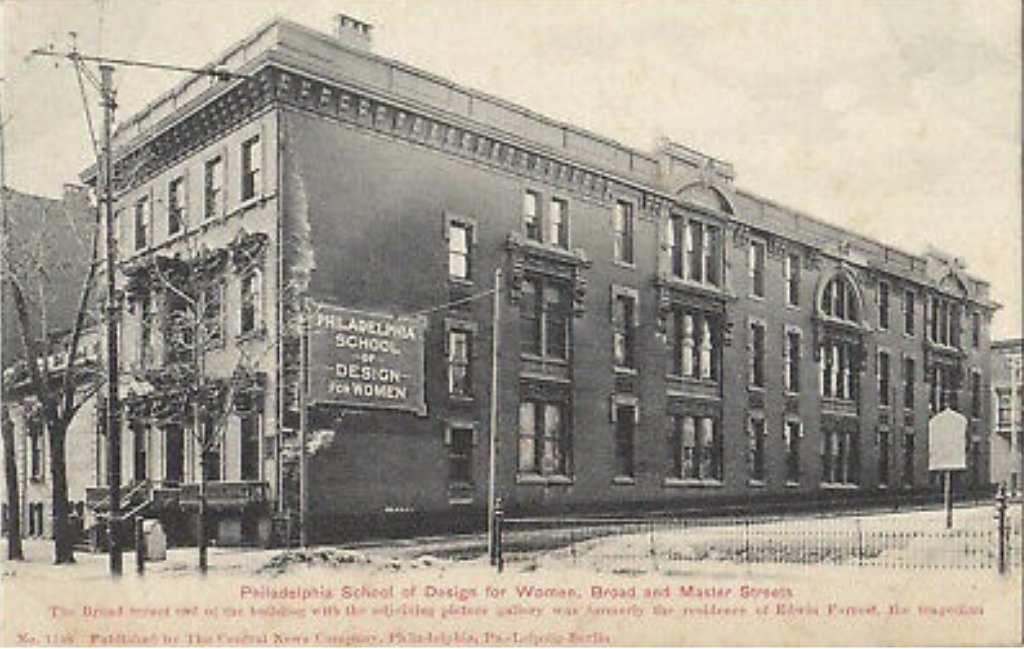
A 1907 photo of Philadelphia School of Design for Women on Broad Street

John Sartain was the school's leader until 1920. In 1920 the position of principal was renamed dean, and Sartain's granddaughter, Harriet Sartain, held that position from 1920 to 1946. Additional presidents are listed in the book Moore College of Art & Design by Sharon G. Hoffman with Amanda M. Mott.

Harriet Sartain implemented life-drawing classes at the Philadelphia School of Design for Women, using draped male and nude women models, which was revolutionary at the time for women artists. Sartain created a professional program that was built upon technical and lengthy training and high standards. The women were taught to create works of art based upon three-dimensional and human forms, based upon her training in Paris and at the Pennsylvania Academy of the Fine Arts. She was responsible for introducing important faculty members such as Robert Henri, Samuel Murray and Daniel Garber. In 1892, Robert Henri began teaching at the school. William Innes Homer said, "A born teacher, Henri enjoyed immediate success at the school."

Nina de Angeli Walls wrote,

As [Emily] Sartain's career illustrates, art schools conferred professional status in a cultural field once dominated by men. Women artists used formal schooling to counter the accusation of amateurism frequently leveled at them. Nineteenth century design schools were the first institutions to offer professional certification for women in such careers as art education, fabric design, or magazine illustration; hence, the schools opened unprecedented paths to female economic independence.

In 1932, the Philadelphia School of Design for Women merged into the Moore Institute of Art, Science, and Industry. It is now the Moore College of Art and Design, which offers both a Bachelor of Fine Arts degree and a Master of Arts in Art Education. The Edwin Forrest House, the school's home between 1880 and 1959, was designated a National Historic Landmark in recognition of its association with the school.

== Faculty ==
- Rae Sloan Bredin
- Stephen James Ferris
- Daniel Garber
- Robert Henri
- Arthur Meltzer
- Peter Moran
- Samuel Murray
- Emily Sartain
- Harriet Sartain
- Leopold Seyffert

== Students ==
- Elenore Abbott
- Emma Astel
- Theresa Bernstein
- Mary-Russell Ferrell Colton
- Florence Esté
- Katherine Levin Farrell
- Lillian Genth
- Bessie Pease Gutmann
- Charlotte Harding
- Ella Sophonisba Hergesheimer
- Edith Lucile Howard
- Phebe Westcott Humphreys
- Anna Russell Jones
- Gertrude Alice Kay
- Alice Kindler
- Maria Louise Kirk
- Annie Traquair Lang
- Alice Mumford
- Phoebe Davis Natt
- Alice Neel
- Anne Parrish
- Deborah Griscom Passmore
- Katharine Pyle
- Jessie Willcox Smith
- Alice Barber Stephens
- Paulette Van Roekens (also a faculty member, 1923 - 1961)

== See also ==
- Timeline of women's colleges in the United States
