= Phoebe Davis Natt =

American painter

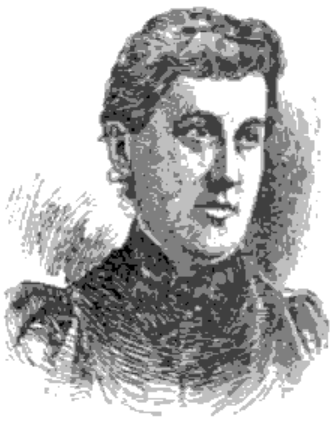
- Born: November 23, 1848; Bellefonte, Pennsylvania, U.S.
- Died: July 23, 1899 (aged 50); Philadelphia, Pennsylvania, U.S.
- Known for: Painting

Phoebe Davis Natt (1848–1899) was an American painter.

== Biography ==
Natt was born in Bellefonte, Pennsylvania on November 23, 1848. She studied at the Philadelphia School of Design for Women and the Pennsylvania Academy of the Fine Arts She also studied in Paris, France and Florence, Italy. Her teachers included Thomas Eakins and Tony Robert-Fleury. She studied etching with Stephen Parrish.

Natt exhibited her art at The Women's Pavilion of the Philadelphia Centennial Exposition of 1876. Her work was included in the 1888 exhibition "Women Etchers of America", where she is listed as Natt, Phebe D. (Miss). She exhibited her work in the Woman's Building at the 1893 World's Columbian Exposition in Chicago, Illinois. Natt also exhibited her work at the Paris Salon, the National Academy of Design, the Salmagundi Club, the Boston Art Club, and the Art Institute of Chicago.

Natt died in Philadelphia on July 23, 1899.

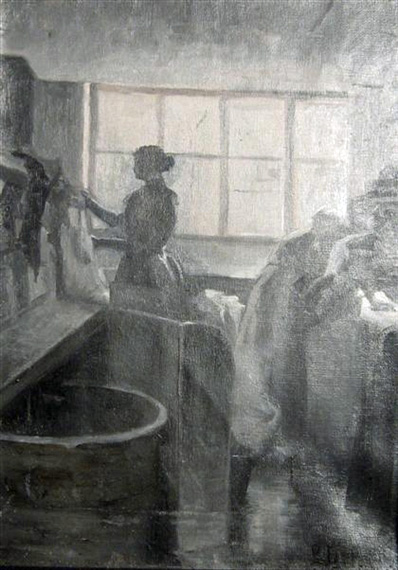
Washer Woman
