= New Freedom Theatre =

Theatre in Philadelphia, Pennsylvania, US

New Freedom Theatre is an African-American theatre company in residence at the Freedom Theatre in Philadelphia established in 1966. The theatre has mounted several hundred productions as well as having taught tens of thousands of students in their 50-year-old educational programs history, making it Pennsylvania's oldest African-American theatrical institution.

== History ==
=== Founding ===
The New Freedom Theatre was founded in 1966 by John E. Allen Jr while working as a supervisor at the Sun Oil Company (now known as Sunoco). He left his job in 1973 to run the theatre full-time. At first, the theatre used the facilities of the nearby Temple University and ran out of a storefront in North Philadelphia but was able to move in 1968 to the Edwin Forrest House on North Broad Street with help from Robert E. Leslie Sr. The building was initially owned by a brewer called William Gaul. In 1853 Edwin Forrest, a prolific tragedian, purchased the home. Upon his death in 1872, Edwin left his estate to retired actors.

In the early days of the theatre, crime such as prostitution and drug dealing that occurred within the theatre's neighborhood. To protect the theatre students, Allen would ask criminals to leave the area before they arrived for classes. Crime has since decreased with time and the installation of more streetlights.

The facility now houses small meeting & rehearsal rooms, a black box theatre, a private reception lobby, and 299-seat proscenium John E. Allen, Jr. Theatre.

=== Acquisition ===
On July 10, 1990, The New Freedom Theatre was acquired by the Pennsylvania Historical and Museum Commission, which provided renovations for the New Freedom Theatre for a nominal sum.

== Neighborhood ==
The New Freedom theatre is surrounded by other historical sites including the Blue Horizon boxing venue, located on the same block as the theatre, which dons a mural of Muhammed Ali, Joe Frazier, George Foreman, and Larry Holmes on its wall facing the theatre. Across Master Street sits the Great Harvest Baptist Church, built in 1823. North of the theatre is the Leon H. Sullivan Human Services Center, which houses a variety of social service organizations.

== Leadership ==
After the death of co-founder and artistic director John E. Allen, Jr., the theatre's board of directors appointed Walter Dallas, former head of Philadelphia's University of the Arts theatre program. Dallas made the theatre an Equity house and created links with theatre professionals across the country to bring prominence to the New Freedom Theatre. Under the leadership of Walter Dallas, the company completed a $10-million capital fund-raising drive which created the 299-seat John E. Allen, Jr. theatre, which opened for the 1996–1997 season (American Theatre 1995 Graham).

The current artistic director of The New Freedom Theatre is Rajendra Ramoon Maharaj. He is an Indo-Caribbean American artist, educator and activist. His credits at the New Freedom Theatre include The Ballad of Trayvon Martin, Jamaica, Don't Bother Me, I Can't Cope, The Colored Museum, and Walk Through Time.

The executive producing director is Sandra Norris Haughton. She is known as a successful professional in evaluating and implementing new strategies for cultural institutions in distress and developed transformational strategies to redefine and make them viable.

== Education ==
New Freedom Theatre offers educational programs for all age groups including elementary, middle school, high school, and adults. Educational program participants study traditional and contemporary performance skills and theory, theatre techniques, writing and aspects of technical production.

65% of Philadelphia school children finish high school while 98% of Freedom Theatre students do, and 55% of Philadelphia high school graduates move on to higher education while 85% of Freedom theatre students do.

== Theatre alumni ==
Alumni of the theatre include: Leslie Odom, Erika Alexander, Samm-Art Williams, and Wanya Morris.

== Controversy ==
In 2016, there was backlash when a group of instructors at the New Freedom Theatre Performing Arts Training School were fired after years of service, three of which were long-time faculty members, including two of Robert E. Leslie's daughters (Gail Leslie, Diane Leslie). Leadership says they were revamping the program due to low enrollment, and to make the theatre stronger and more sustainable.
