= Edwin Forrest House =

Historic house in Pennsylvania, United States

- Edwin Forrest House; Philadelphia School of Design for Women
- U.S. National Register of Historic Places
- U.S. National Historic Landmark
- Pennsylvania state historical marker
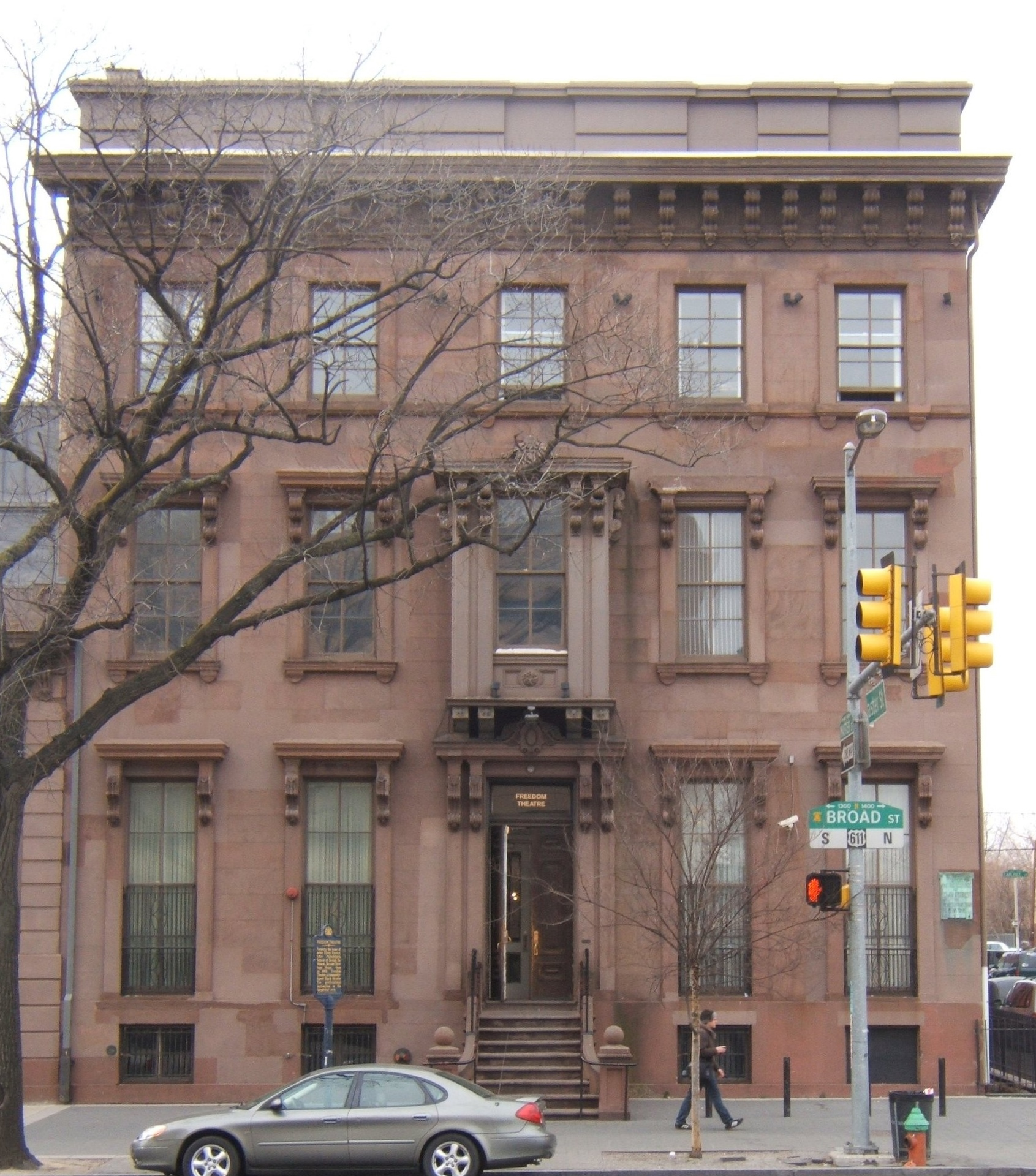
- Edwin Forrest House, now Freedom Theatre

- Location within Philadelphia Location within Pennsylvania Location within the United States
- Location: 1346 N. Broad St. Philadelphia, Pennsylvania
- Coordinates: 39.9744°N 75.1592°W
- Built: 1853–54
- Architect: probably Stephen Decatur Button. James H. Windrim (1880 alterations)
- Architectural style: Italianate
- NRHP reference No.: 72001152, 93001608

Significant dates
- Added to NRHP: January 13, 1972
- Designated NHL: November 4, 1993
- Designated PHMC: May 16, 1991

The Edwin Forrest House (also known as the Gaul-Forrest House) is an historic house and arts building located at 1346 North Broad Street in Philadelphia, Pennsylvania. Built between 1853 and 1854, it was home, from 1880 until 1960, to the Philadelphia School of Design for Women, at one time one of the nation's largest art schools for women.

The house was designated as a National Historic Landmark in 1993.

== Description and history ==
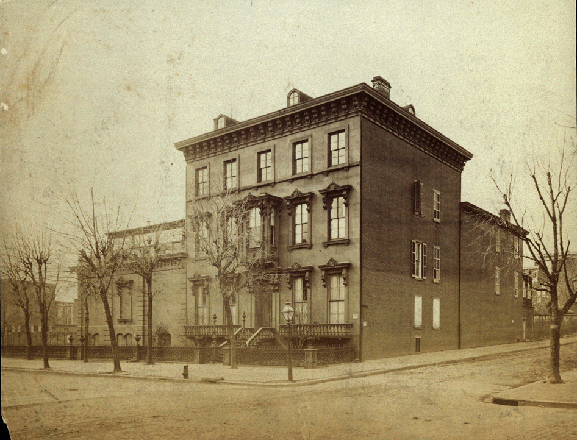
Edwin Forrest Mansion, after its addition of a theater wing in 1863

The Edwin Forrest House is located in Philadelphia's Yorktown neighborhood, on the west side North Broad Street between Master and West Thompson Streets. The building has three parts: the original townhouse, a theater addition to the south, and a classroom wing to the rear.

The townhouse is a three-story brick building with a brownstone, exhibiting Italianate styling that was popular at the time of its construction. Windows decrease in height from the first to third floors, and those on the first two floors have decorative bracketed hoods over them. The main entrance is at the center of the five-bay facade, topped by a hood with paired brackets. The window directly above projects, with a similarly bracketed base and hood.

The original townhouse portion of the building was built between 1853 and 1854 for William Gaul, a wealthy brewer, to a design by Stephen D. Button, a prolific local architect.

A year after its completion, it was bought by actor Edwin Forrest, who resided there until his death in the house in 1872.

The Philadelphia School of Design for Women purchased the property in 1880, and built an extensive rear addition westward to Carlisle Street, to house art studios. The addition's Master Street façade was brick, but fitted with brownstone-trimmed windows consistent with those of the original house.

The school, which later changed its name to the Moore College of Art, continued to occupy the building until 1960. The Philadelphia Cotillion Society purchased the building and used it as a community center until 1968.

As of the early 21st century, the building is occupied by Freedom Theatre, which provides professional instruction in acting and live theatre production.

The building was listed on the National Register of Historic Places in 1972 for its architecture, and was designated a National Historic Landmark in 1993 for its association with the art school, whose only surviving building it is.

== See also ==
- List of National Historic Landmarks in Philadelphia
- National Register of Historic Places listings in North Philadelphia
