= Sarah Peter =

American philanthropist

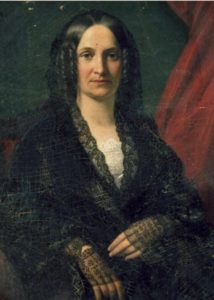
- Died: 6 February 1877
- Occupation: Philanthropist

Sarah Anne Worthington King Peter (10 May 1800, Chillicothe, Ohio – 6 February 1877, Cincinnati) was an American philanthropist and patron of the arts.

== Life ==
Sarah Anne Worthington was born on May 10, 1800, at Chillicothe, Ohio. Her father, Thomas Worthington, was Governor of Ohio, from 1814–18, and also served in the United States Senate. She attended private schools in Frankfort, Kentucky, and in Washington, D.C.

On May 15, 1816, she married Edward King, son of Rufus King of New York. In 1831, she and her husband moved from Chillicothe to Cincinnati, where he died on February 6, 1836. Following Edward King's death, she moved to Cambridge, Massachusetts to be near two of her children attending Harvard.

In October 1844, she married William Peter, British consul at Philadelphia. During her residence at Philadelphia, she founded on December 2, 1850, the Philadelphia School of Design for Women, now Moore College of Art and Design. She attended St. Peter's Church, Philadelphia at Third and Pine during this time. William Peter died on February 6, 1853.

Returning to Cincinnati, she spent most of her remaining years as a patron of art, and in works of charity and philanthropy, and established the Ladies' Academy of Fine Arts. Sarah Peter became a Catholic convert at Rome in March, 1855, being instructed there by Gaspard Mermillod. The foundations of the Sisters of the Good Shepherd, the Sisters of Mercy, the Little Sisters of the Poor in Cincinnati and other institutions owed much to her generosity. In 1862, she volunteered as a nurse, and went with the sisters who followed General Grant's army in the southwest after the Battle of Pittsburg Landing.

== Sources ==
- King, Memoirs of the Life of Mrs. Sarah Peter(Cincinnati, 1889);
- Catholic Telegraph (Cincinnati), files;
- Freeman's Journal (New York), files.
