= Charles Lester Leonard =

American radiologist

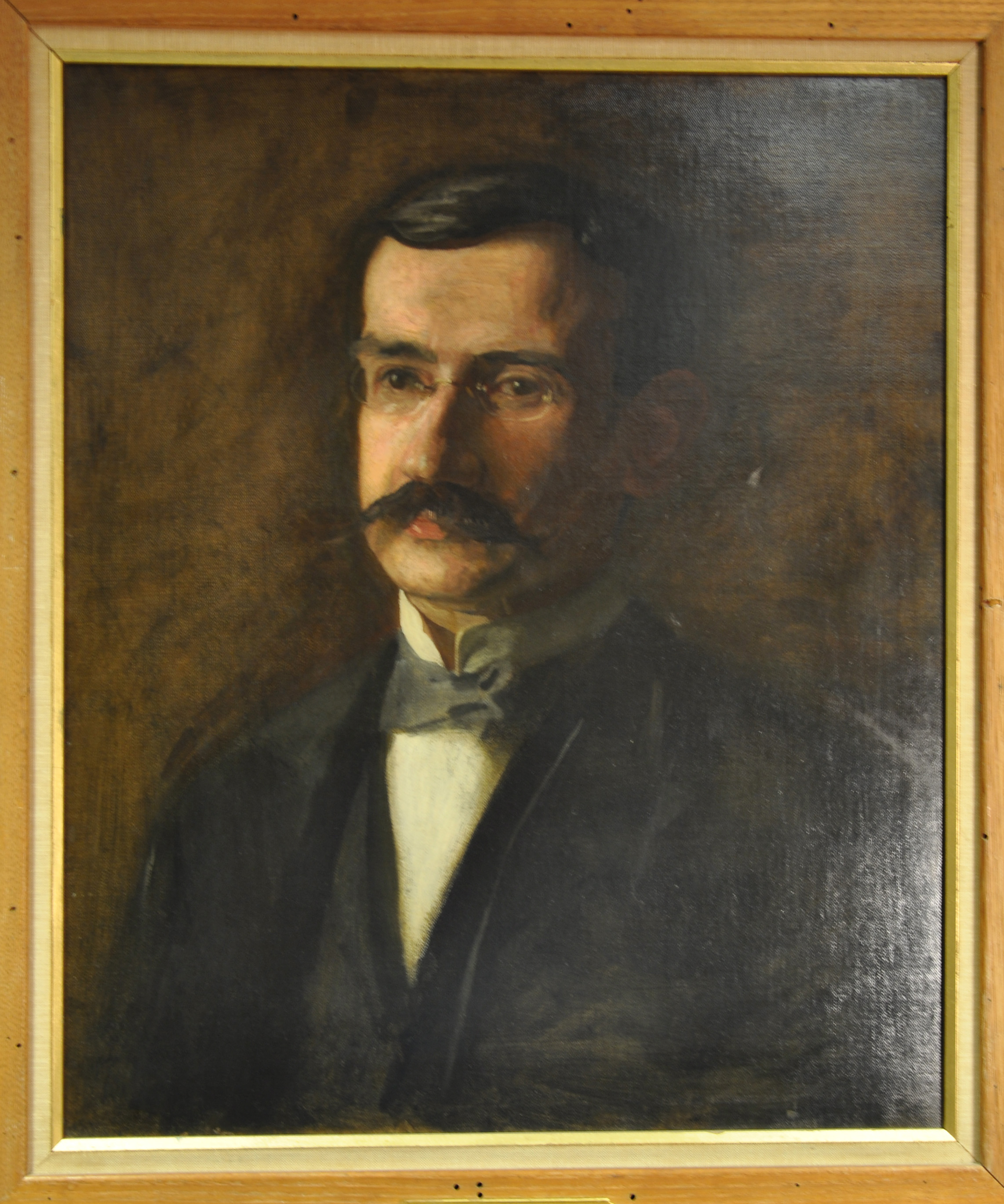
- Born: December 29, 1861; Easthampton, Massachusetts
- Died: September 22, 1913 (aged 51); Atlantic City, New Jersey
- Medical career
- Profession: Medicine
- Field: Radiology
- Institutions: Hospital of the University of Pennsylvania

Charles Lester Leonard (1861–1913) was an American physician and X-ray pioneer. Leonard was the first radiologist at the Hospital of the University of Pennsylvania, founded the Philadelphia Roentgen Ray Society, and served as president of the American Roentgen Ray Society in 1904–1905. He was known as one of the foremost experts in urological X-ray diagnosis, and he was the first American physician to demonstrate kidney stone disease with X-rays.

A native of Massachusetts, Leonard completed bachelor's degrees at the University of Pennsylvania and Harvard University, then returned to Penn for medical school. As a student, he was interested in photography, and after going to Europe to work in science laboratories, he developed an interest in photomicrography. Leonard captured microscopic images that furthered the understanding of the life cycles of microorganisms.

Leonard was associated with University Hospital from the mid-1890s to 1902. He was first named an assistant instructor in clinical surgery under J. William White, and then he ran the hospital's X-ray service, which seemed to combine his interests in photography and surgical problems. While he was at Penn, Leonard opened a private office for taking X-rays. After he left the medical school, he devoted his time to this private practice as well as to writing about radiology and representing the specialty nationally and internationally at medical conferences.

Like many of the pioneers in radiography, Leonard suffered from adverse effects of radiation exposure before the causes of these problems were fully understood. During his first several years of X-ray work, he believed that X-ray burns resulted from ungrounded electrical current, so he did not take precautions to shield his body from radiation. Before he died of radiation-induced cancer, Leonard had multiple operations, including the amputation of his entire right arm.

== Early life ==
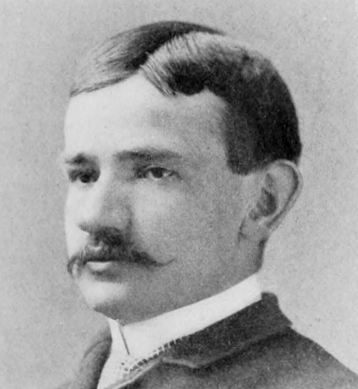
Leonard at Harvard, c. 1886

Leonard was born on December 29, 1861, in Easthampton, Massachusetts, to Moses and Harriet (née Dibble) Leonard. He had two siblings; his brother, Frederick M. Leonard, became a prominent Philadelphia attorney. The family could trace its ancestry back to John Leonard, who left England in 1632 to settle in Springfield, Massachusetts, and to William Brewster, who came to the U.S. on the Mayflower. Another of their forebears, Elijah Leonard, fought in the American Revolutionary War.

Leonard grew up in Philadelphia, and he attended Rittenhouse Academy. He then earned bachelor's degrees at the University of Pennsylvania (1885) and Harvard University (1886). He received a medical degree from Penn in 1889, then went to Europe to observe some laboratory techniques. During his studies, Leonard was interested in photography and served as a model for Eadweard Muybridge's photographic study of human motion called Man Running.

== Career ==
=== Early work at Penn ===
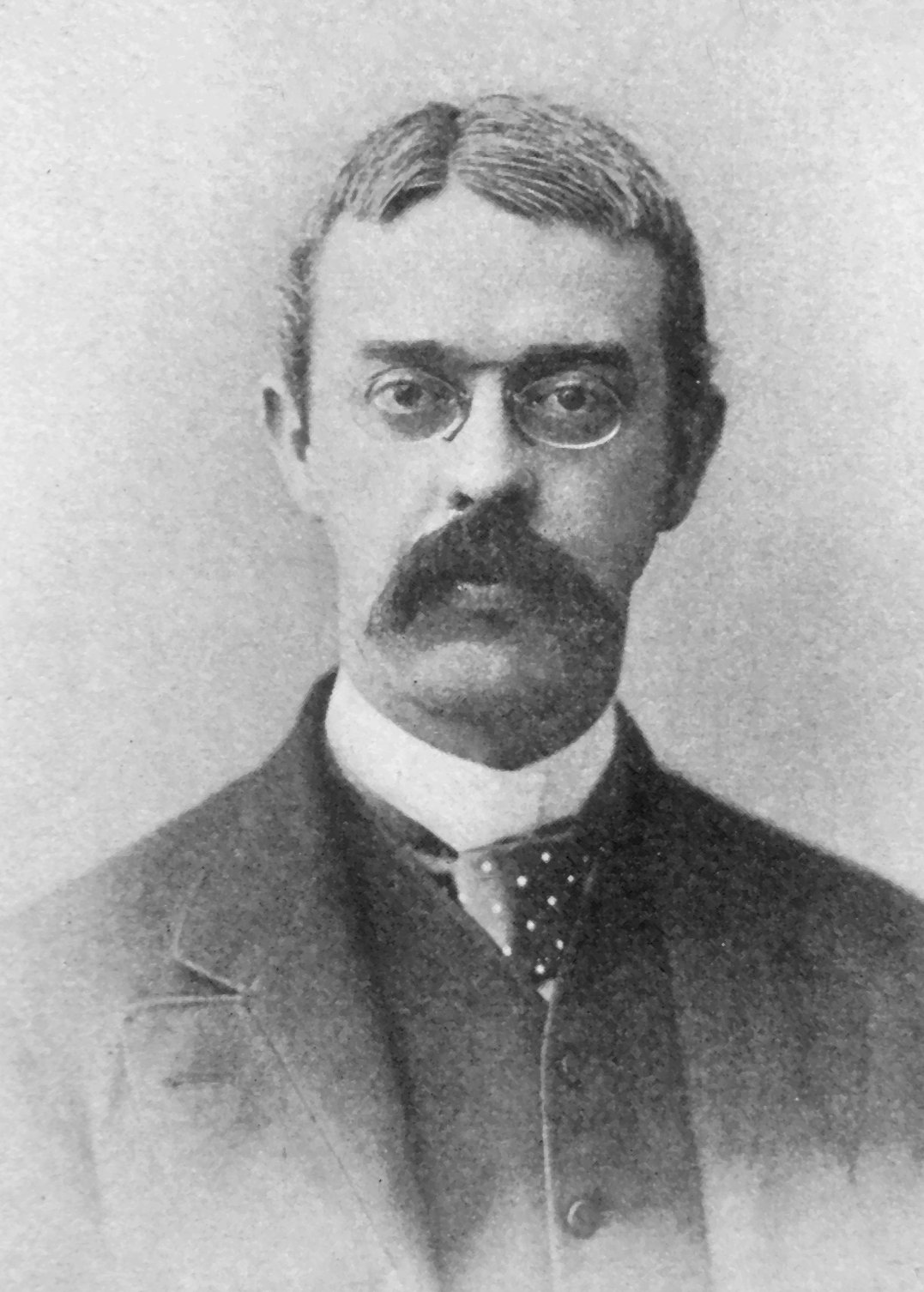
Surgeon J. William White (pictured) supervised Leonard at University Hospital.

Leonard took a position as an assistant instructor of clinical surgery at Penn, where he worked under surgeon J. William White. The university awarded him a Master of Arts in 1892 while he was already a faculty member. When Penn's William Pepper Clinical Laboratory opened in 1895, Leonard began conducting his laboratory work there. He became interested in photomicrography, which is the acquisition of photographic images from microscopes. He devised an electric lens-shutter that allowed him to capture microorganisms in different phases of their life cycles.

In 1895, Wilhelm Röntgen produced the first X-rays. Early on, X-rays were used mostly for surgical applications. Leonard already had interests in surgery and photography, so he was fascinated by the potential for X-rays. A Philadelphia physicist named Arthur Willis Goodspeed set up a radiography laboratory near University Hospital, and the hospital initially sent its patients there for X-rays, but it became impractical to transport a patient to this facility each time a study was required. In September 1896, Leonard began running a hospital-wide X-ray service out of the Pepper Laboratory. White had a separate X-ray laboratory, but it was used almost solely for teaching purposes.

While Leonard's X-ray apparatus in the Pepper Laboratory was on the grounds of University Hospital, it still proved impractical to transport hospitalized patients there. Leonard's X-ray equipment was relocated in late 1897 to the Agnew Memorial Pavilion, a brand new wing of the hospital, but the decision to move it there came after the new wing was fully designed. Leonard had a single X-ray exam room near the surgical dispensary, and the darkroom was so small that no visitors or students could observe Leonard as he developed the X-ray plates. Leonard imaged 141 hospital patients in 1901, and the most common studies were of the abdomen and pelvis; the exposure time for each patient could be as long as several minutes.

Leonard's influence in radiology quickly extended beyond University Hospital. In 1899, he was approached by Philadelphia General Hospital and asked to help a young physician, George E. Pfahler, with setting up an X-ray service at that hospital. Leonard advised Pfahler on the types of equipment to install, including a self-regulating X-ray tube that Leonard had success with from the Philadelphia-based James W. Queen & Company. Around this time, Leonard began conducting research and writing more extensively. He became interested in using X-rays to diagnose fractures and to locate foreign bodies in the eye.

=== Later career and shift to private practice ===
During his time at Penn, Leonard also opened a private X-ray office in Philadelphia's Center City, and he became the director of the X-ray laboratories at Philadelphia Polyclinic and Methodist Episcopal Hospital. Leonard was the first American physician to identify kidney stones on an X-ray. While he continued to do general X-ray work, he gained a wide reputation for his ability to diagnose kidney stones.

Leonard used an X-ray system consisting of accumulators and a Ruhmkorff coil with a low-voltage primary winding that excited a self-regulating X-ray tube. In 1936, radiologist Percy Brown wrote that Leonard's intricate setup "was a source of great interest and some surprise to his contemporaries, but will amaze radiologists of a later generation who now read of them for the first time." Leonard examined more than 300 patients for kidney stones with this technique, and he said he had an error rate of three percent. He knew of 45 patients who had been taken to surgery despite no X-ray evidence of kidney stones, and he said that surgeons did not find kidney stones in any of those patients. Leonard influenced the surgical management of ureteral stones by showing that the patient was usually able to pass small stones in this area by themselves.

Leonard was one of the first physicians to work with stereo-roentgenography, which used stereoscopy to produce three-dimensional X-ray images that allowed physicians to better determine the anatomic relationships between organs. Leonard used the technique to visualize a patient's small intestine. He may have been the first American radiologist to define a dosage unit for radiation, though it was not possible to measure dosage at that point. Commenting on the possibility of employing radiation therapy, he said that physicians needed to be able to deliver a controlled dose, and the unit should be defined as "the unit quantity of electricity passing across a unit gap in unit time under the influences of radiation at unit distance under standard conditions of barometer and temperature."

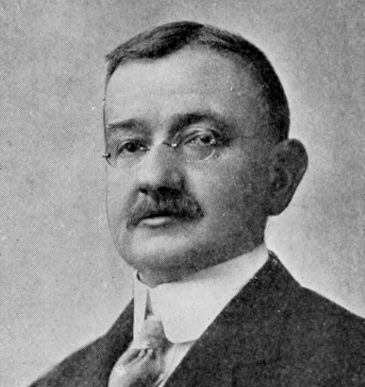
c. 1911

Leonard left Penn in 1902. Two things likely contributed to this decision: a busy schedule of other professional responsibilities and the onset of disabling tissue injuries from radiation exposure. He was heavily involved in the American Roentgen Ray Society, serving as its president for 1904–1905. He hosted a number of physicians at his office in 1905 to discuss their interest in radiology. This group became the Philadelphia Roentgen Ray Society, and Leonard was the organization's secretary until he died. He served as the American Medical Association (AMA) delegate to several international conferences on radiology, and he was an editor or associate editor for several medical journals.

== Personal life ==
Leonard married Ruth Hodgson, and they had a daughter named Catherine Henrietta Lawson Leonard. Catherine married James Bennett Hance, a member of the Indian Medical Service, in Oxford in 1916. In his leisure time, Leonard enjoyed visiting the woods in Canada.

== X-ray injuries ==
In the earliest days of X-rays, a radiographer had to take an image of his own hands to test the X-ray tube before each patient image was taken. The fragile X-ray equipment had to be positioned precisely, and this required that the radiographer's face, hands and arms were in close proximity to the X-ray beam during these lengthy examinations. In the era before radiation safety was well understood, many X-ray pioneers suffered adverse effects from radiation overexposure. Leonard developed X-ray burns and then radiation-induced cancer that started in a finger and eventually traveled up the entire arm and to other parts of his body. Historian Rebecca Herzig wrote that the pain from Leonard's radiation injuries "seems merely to have intensified his fascination with the ray"; she wrote that the ten-year period of Leonard's most productive X-ray research corresponded to a decade of increasing physical suffering.

Leonard mentioned X-ray burns in a presentation before the AMA in 1897. At that time, he shared the belief of many physicians that X-ray burns were caused by a lack of grounding of the electrical current from the apparatus. He laid an aluminum sheet between the patient and the X-ray tube and had a grounding wire that ran from the aluminum down to the floor. In an 1898 article in the New York Medical Journal, Leonard described a patient with inoperable cancer who underwent 25-minute X-ray exposures every day for three weeks. The surrounding areas were shielded with the aluminum sheet, and the patient sustained no X-ray burns (and received no therapeutic benefit). This strengthened Leonard's belief that X-rays themselves were not the cause of what were known as X-ray burns.

Leonard was so convinced of his electrical current explanation that for several years he did not take any precautions to shield his hands from radiation. The problems with Leonard's hands worsened, and an already skeptical public most likely began to notice the injuries to his skin. At one point, still not fully aware of the risks of radiation and intrigued by the possibility of radiation therapy, Leonard purposely applied an intense dose of radiation to his hand. He had hoped that the radiation would kill any cancer cells and help him avoid further surgery or amputations. After this incident, the finger required amputation.

A 1903 presentation showed that Leonard had become concerned about the X-ray beams themselves rather than the associated electrical current. He told attendees at that year's ARRS meeting that he had devised a lead-lined box that surrounded the X-ray tube in an attempt to prevent X-rays from scattering about the exam room.

== Death and legacy ==
During the final months of his life, Leonard spent much of his time collaborating with Austrian radiologist Guido Holzknecht on a review of radiography in gastrointestinal conditions that was to be read at the August 1913 meeting of the Section of Radiology of the International Congress of Medicine. In spite of significant pain and suffering, Leonard read through literature in English, French and German in preparing the work. A memorial issue of the American Journal of Roentgenology said that Leonard was known for bearing his illness in secret.

In the summer of 1913, Leonard went to Atlantic City, New Jersey, where he was hoping that the sea air would improve his health. He became confined to bed soon after he arrived in Atlantic City, and he died there on September 22, 1913. He had undergone amputation of his hand several years earlier, and his entire arm was amputated a few months before he died.

The American Roentgen Ray Society established the Charles Lester Leonard Prize to recognize outstanding contributions to X-ray technology. Leonard is buried in an unmarked grave near the conservatory at West Laurel Hill Cemetery in Bala Cynwyd, Pennsylvania.
