= Emidio Angelo =

American cartoonist

- Born: December 4, 1903; Philadelphia, Pennsylvania, U.S.
- Died: September 2, 1990 (aged 86); Philadelphia
- Resting place: Holy Cross Cemetery
- Education: Pennsylvania Academy of the Fine Arts
- Occupations: Painter and Cartoonist
- Spouse: Yolanda Marinelli
- Children: 3 daughters

Emidio Angelo (December 4, 1903 – September 2, 1990) was an American painter and cartoonist. Born to Italian immigrants, he studied at the Pennsylvania Academy of the Fine Arts. He was a cartoonist for The Philadelphia Inquirer from 1937 to 1954, and his cartoon panel, Emily and Mabel, was printed in 150 newspapers in the 1950s. Angelo won a gold medal from the Philadelphia Sketch Club in 1969 for his comic The Curio Shop. From the 1980s to his death, he was a cartoonist for the Main Line Times.
