= Homer Clyde Snook =

American engineer and inventor (1878–1942)

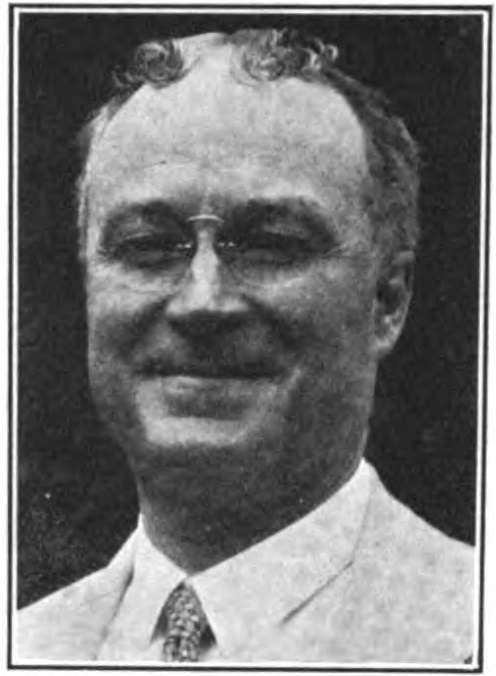
- Born: March 25, 1878; Antwerp, Ohio, U.S.
- Died: September 23, 1942 (aged 64); Summit, New Jersey, U.S.
- Scientific career
- Fields: Electrical Engineer
- Workplaces: Western Electric; Bell Laboratories

Homer Clyde Snook (25 March 1878 – 23 September 1942) was an American electrical engineer and inventor. He developed the Snook apparatus, the first interrupterless device produced for X-ray work.

== Life and times ==
Homer Clyde Snook was born in 1878, at Antwerp, Ohio, to Judge Wilson H. Snook and Nancy Jane Snook (née Graves). He had 4 siblings, brothers Otto W. and Ward Hunt, and sisters Lee May and Ethel Maud. On 24 June 1903, Snook, age 24, occupation listed as science expert, form Philadelphia, married May Eusebia McKee (born 17 May 1877), age 26, occupation listed as at home, from Warren, Ohio. He was the son of Wilson H. Snook and Nannie Graves. The bride was the daughter of John McKee and Mary E. Kline. The ceremony took place at Warren, Ohio by Minister S.W. McFadden.

In 1908, Snook applied for and was issued a passport on 25 July 1908 “to go abroad temporarily;” with the intent “to return to the United States within six months”. The application was to travel alone. He listed his residence as Philadelphia with the occupation of electrical engineer. The description of applicant included: age: 30 years; stature: 5 feet 8 1/2 inches; forehead: broad; eyes: brown; nose: straight thick; mouth: medium; chin: broad, full; hair: dark curly; complexion: fair; face: well filled broad. Snook requested that the passport be sent to 417 Mariner and Merchant Building in Philadelphia. Records indicate that Snook took at least two trips to England, where he worked with a manufacturer to have the Snook apparatus produced. In October 1908, Snook departed Liverpool, England and arrived at New York City aboard the RMS Cedric. On 1 June 1910, Snook arrived in New York aboard the SS Kaiser Wilhelm II having sailed from Southampton, England.

On 12 September 1918, near the close of World War I, Homer Clyde Snook registered for the Draft at East Orange, New Jersey. He recorded his address as 45 North Arlington Avenue in East Orange, New Jersey. Snook reported his nearest relative as his wife, Mary McKee Snook at the same location. His age in years was recorded as 40 and race as white. With date of birth as March 25, 1878. He declared to be a native born U.S. citizen. His present occupation was electrical engineer and employed by the Western Electric Co. located at 463 West Street in New York, N.Y. Description of registrant was listed as medium height, stout build, brown eye color and gray hair color.

In 1942, at the start of World War II, Homer Clyde Snook registered for the Draft. His residence was recorded as 45 Woodland Avenue in Summit, New Jersey with the same mailing address. The name and address of person who will always know your address was listed as Mrs. H. Clyde Snook at the same address. His employer was recorded as self and place of employment as the same address. His age in years was 64, place of birth as Antwerp, Ohio on March 25, 1878. The draft registration card, D.S.S. Form 1, stated the requirement for who must register: “Men born on or after April 28, 1877 and on or before February 16, 1897”.

== Education ==
From 1898 to 1900, Snook taught physics at Ohio Wesleyan University. The school's catalog listed him as an assistant in physics. In 1900, Snook became a member of Phi Delta Theta. The Ohio Beta chapter at Ohio Wesleyan University listed Snook as an electrical expert at 1000 Chestnut Street in Philadelphia, Pennsylvania. In 1900, Snook graduated from Ohio Wesleyan University and received the Bachelor of Arts degree. In 1902, he graduated from Allegheny College with a Master of Arts degree. In 1910, Ohio Wesleyan University conferred the honorary degree of Master of Science on Snook.

== Career ==
From 1900 to 1901, Snook taught physics and chemistry in the high school for the Soldiers' and Sailors' Orphans Home at Xenia, Ohio. From 1901 to 1902, he was assistant professor of chemistry at Allegheny College in Meadville, Pennsylvania. He worked as a salesman and electrical expert, with the James W. Queen & Company in Philadelphia, from 1902 until 1903.

In 1903, Snook started development of a cross-arm, high-voltage rectifier switch. In 1903, while at Queen, he completed work on the mechanical rectifier that enabled X-ray tubes to be powered by alternating current. Also in 1903, Snook and two other employees, G. Herbert White and Edwin Kelly, left Queen to establish the Radioelectric Company. Radioelectric became the Roentgen Manufacturing Company. In 1907, Snook manufactured the first interrupterless transformer. In 1907, Snook introduced the Snook apparatus, the first interrupterless device produced for X-ray work. The Snook apparatus was manufactured in England. Snook next became president of the Roentgen Manufacturing Company in Philadelphia and was responsible for technical development and oversight of manufacturing until 1913. In 1913, Snook formed a new company and became president of the Snook-Roentgen Manufacturing Company, which grew form the Roentgen Manufacturing Company. From 1916 to 1917, he was vice-president of the Victor Electric Corporation in Chicago, Illinois and in 1917, Snook moved to New York, N.Y. to accept a position with the Western Electric Company as an electrical engineer.

In early 1925, working at American Telephone & Telegraph Co., Snook conducted a study of noise emission in automobiles using a modified audiometer, the first time that sound level was measured taking into account the loudness response of the human ear (with Fletcher's and Weber's hearing curves).

In 1925 he moved to Bell Telephone Laboratories, and in 1927 became a consulting engineer. For his works into the acoustics field, he became Fellow of the Acoustical Society of America ASA in 1931.

== Professional service ==
- Allegheny College, Professor of Physics and Chemistry
- American Association for the Advancement of Science
- American Institute of Electrical Engineers
- American Roentgen Ray Society
- Engineers’ Club of Philadelphia
- National Academy of Sciences
- National Research Council

== Awards and honors ==
In 1910, Ohio Wesleyan University conferred the honorary degree of Master of Science on Snook.

- The Franklin Institute, Longstreth Award in Engineering for Snook X-Ray System, 1919
- American Institute of Electrical Engineers, Fellow, 1920
- Radiological Society of North America, Gold Medal, 1924
- American College of Radiology, Gold Medal, 1928
- Philadelphia Roentgen Ray Society, Annual Oration Honoree, 1960

== Patents ==
=== 1900s ===
- Stereoscopic apparatus. U.S. Patent No. 733,756.
- Art of electrical signaling. U.S. Patent No. 736,884.
- Stereoscopic apparatus. U.S. Patent No. 758,117.
- Wireless telegraphy. U.S. Patent No. 768,778.
- Electrical measuring instrument. U.S. Patent No. 768,957.

=== 1910s ===
- X-ray system. U.S. Patent No. 954,056.
- Stereoscopic apparatus. U.S. Patent No. 997,338.
- X-ray tube and vacuum control therefor. U.S. Patent No. 1,010,197.
- Fluoroscopic apparatus. U.S. Patent No. 1,117,266.
- Vacuum regulation. U.S. Patent No. 1,117,267.
- Stereoscopic x-ray system. U.S. Patent No. 1,123,942.
- Polyphase x-ray system. U.S. Patent No. 1,131,870.
- Vacuum regulation. U.S. Patent No. 1,143,327.
- Stereoscopic x-ray system. U.S. Patent No. 1,163,959.
- X-ray tube. U.S. Patent No. 1,165,138.
- Evacuation process. U.S. Patent No. 1,166,792.
- Rectifying apparatus. U.S. Patent No. 1,180,329.
- X-ray system. U.S. Patent No. 1,233,137.
- Vacuum regulation. U.S. Patent No. 1,247,027.
- High-tension rectifying apparatus. U.S. Patent No. 1,251,126.
- Vacuum regulation. U.S. Patent No. 1,267,706.

=== 1920s ===
- Vacuum pump. U.S. Patent No. 1,434,851.
- Electrical cut-out. U.S. Patent No. 1,480,225.
- Oscillation generator. U.S. Patent No. 1,579,895.
- Electric ignition system. U.S. Patent No. 1,589,489.
- Low-impedance electric discharge device. U.S. Patent No. 1,629,009.
- System for converting sound waves into electrical waves. U.S. Patent No. 1,690,255.

=== 1930s ===
- Method of casting ingots. U.S. Patent No. 1,892,044.
- Ingot casting method. U.S. Patent No. 1,961,399.
- Ingot casting apparatus. U.S. Patent No. 1,998,258.
- Microscopy. U.S. Patent 2,153,010.

=== 1940s ===
- Microscopy. U.S. Patent 2,218,270.

== Publications ==
- Snook, H. Clyde. (1905). An amperemeter for high potential currents. Journal of the Franklin Institute, 159(3), 191-198.
- Snook, H. Clyde. (1907). The secondary current of the induction coil. Journal of the Franklin Institute, 164(4), 273-283.
- Snook, H. Clyde. (1908). A new roentgen generator. Archives of the Roentgen Ray, 13(7), 186-188.
- Snook, H. Clyde. (1912). Correspondence: To the Editor of the Archives of the Roentgen Ray. Archives of the Roentgen Ray, 17(2), 82-84.
- Snook, H. Clyde. (1913). Some recent developments in radiography. Journal of the Franklin Institute, 175(1), 1-13.
- Snook, H. Clyde. (1915). New Instruments: New Hydrogen X-Ray Tube. Archives of the Roentgen Ray, 19(10), 372-373.
- Snook, H. Clyde. (1915). New Hydrogen X-Ray Tube. Scientific American, 79, 71-71.
- Snook, H. Clyde. (1925). Automobile-noise Measurement. B-140-1. Bell Telephone Laboratories.
- Snook, H. Clyde. (October 1925). Hearts or What Men Live By, the story of the electrical stethoscope. Bell Laboratories Record. 1(2): 1.
