= Charles Leonard =

Charles Leonard may refer to:

- Charles Leonard (athlete) (1913–2006), American pentathlete and a major general
- Charlie Leonard (Charles Delmonte Leonard, 1912–1952), American Negro league first baseman
- Charles H. Leonard (1822–1918), American Universalist minister, theologian, and academic
- Charles Lester Leonard (1861–1913), American physician and X-ray pioneer
- Charles Webster Leonard (1844–1941), American innovator in textile manufacturing, granite quarry excavation, harness racing, and rail transport
- Chuck Leonard (Charles Wesley Leonard, 1937–2004), American radio personality
