= Henry Troth =

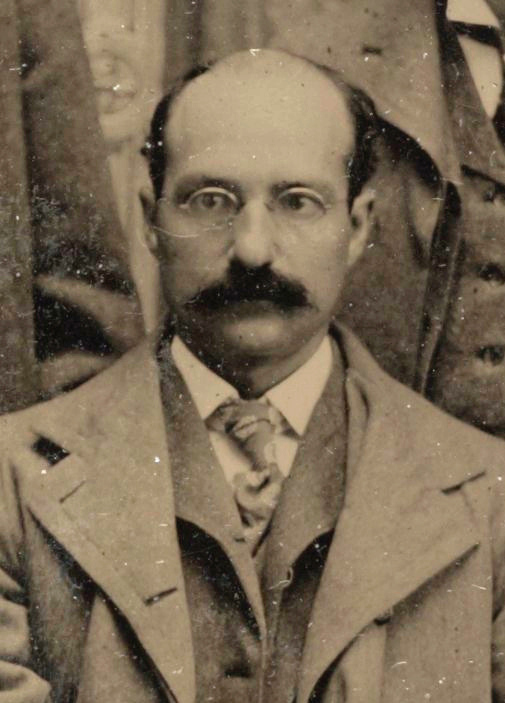
Henry Troth, 1899

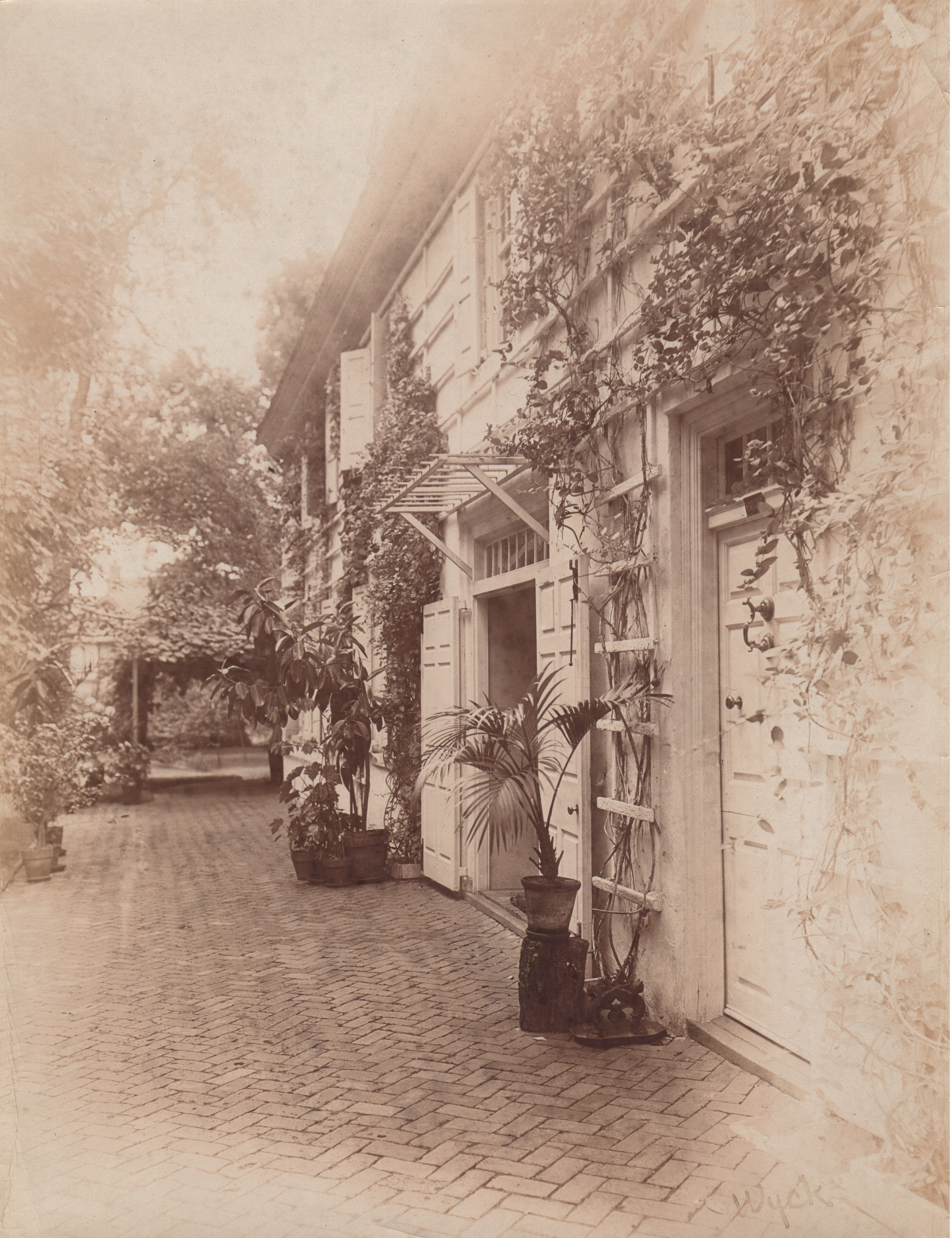
Wyck House, Germantown, Pennsylvania, (c.1900), located on the southwest corner of Germantown Avenue and Walnut Lane, Germantown, Philadelphia, Pennsylvania. Original platinum print on Eastman Kodak sensitized paper by Henry Troth, American Pictorialist.

Henry Troth (September 24, 1859 – April 25, 1945) was an American pictorialist photographer known for his original platinum photographs taken during the 19th-20th century. He developed his special platinum prints from the late 1880s until his death.

== Family ==
Troth was born on September 24, 1859, in Tredyffrin Township, Pennsylvania, into a Quaker family who were prominent figures in Philadelphia history. Troth exhibited his photographs internationally, capturing images of architecture, landscapes and outdoor scenes for popular magazines. His images were also used to illustrate volumes of poetry and essays on nature, as well as John William Harshberger's 1911 Botanical Study The Phytogeographic Survey of North America.

His parents were Samuel Troth (1835-1911) and Anna Speakman (1837–1913), the daughter of Nathaniel Speakman (1791–1860) and his wife, Ann Thomas 1797–1874 who married in 1859 in Concord Township, Pennsylvania. Henry was the second of five children: Louisa Troth (1858–1933), Henry Troth (1859–1945), Charles Speakman Troth, (1862–1863), Emma Troth (1869–1949) and Anna Coates Troth (1870–1943).

Henry's paternal grandfather, Henry Troth (1794-1842) married about the year 1817 to Henrietta Henrie (1793-1874) of Charleston, South Carolina and was a prosperous young Quaker apothecary in Philadelphia. Henry Troth (1794-1842), along with druggist Peter K. Lehman and others founded the Philadelphia College of Pharmacy, the first pharmacy college in the United States, and served for thirteen years as its vice-president and for many years was chairman of its Board of Trustees. Today, the college is known as the Philadelphia University of the Sciences. Henry Troth(1794-1842) also served as a manager of the Schuylkill Navigation Company, was an originator of the House of Refuge, served as a Director of the Bank of the United States and was a trustee of Girard College.

== Awards ==
According to The Philadelphia Sketch Club, Henry Troth was awarded some thirty medals, including the International Society of Amateur Photography (Berlin 1896), Association de Beige Photographic (1896), Wien Photo Club (1898), the Photography Society of India Medal (1901) and the Photo-club de Paris Salon (1903)."

It has been said of Henry Troth's work, that with his "flower studies and landscapes, Henry’s ability to capture the essence of his subject, even while making it beautiful, made him the photographer of choice for volumes of poetry and essays on nature".

"He [Troth] thus combines the veritistic and the impressionistic in his work, and is universally acceptable," wrote Louis Albert Lamb.

The Academy of Natural Sciences used Troth's work for their botanical studies. In later years, Troth produced photographs of architecture and outdoor scenes for popular magazines. His photographs served as the covers for Country Life and Garden Magazine. Mr. Lamb also wrote, "He has the manipulative part of his art developed to a degree of perfection which admits of no superior."

== Photographic collections ==
In 1990, the Philadelphia Museum of Art featured on the cover of their exhibition catalogue, Legacy in Light: Photographic Treasures from Philadelphia Area Public Collections, a photograph taken by Troth. The exhibition ran from May 26-August 12, 1990, and displayed 125 images specifically chosen to represent the rich quality and diversity of select institutional photographic collections.

On rare occasions, original photographs of Troth have come up for auction and are highly sought after and prized by collectors of the Pictorialist genre. A large portion of his photographic collection can also be seen by the public within the collections of: the Library of Congress, the Smithsonian Institution, the Library Company of Philadelphia, the Academy of Natural Sciences in Philadelphia, the Minneapolis Institute of Arts, and the George Eastman Museum.

The Eastman House Collection of the George Eastman Museum, alone holds approximately 150 of Henry Troth's photographs, nearly all of them botanical specimens which were part of a gift from the collections of the American Museum of Photography in Philadelphia which had closed in 1977.

It is believed that the largest private collection of originally signed photographs of Henry Troth's works, dating from the 1890s to early 1900s, are privately held by the Estate of the Speakman-Miller-Matsinger, cousins of the late Henry Troth (1859-1945).
