= Fred Wagner =

American painter

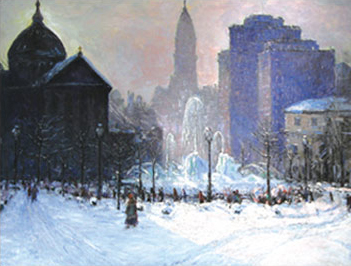
A painting by Fred Wagner.

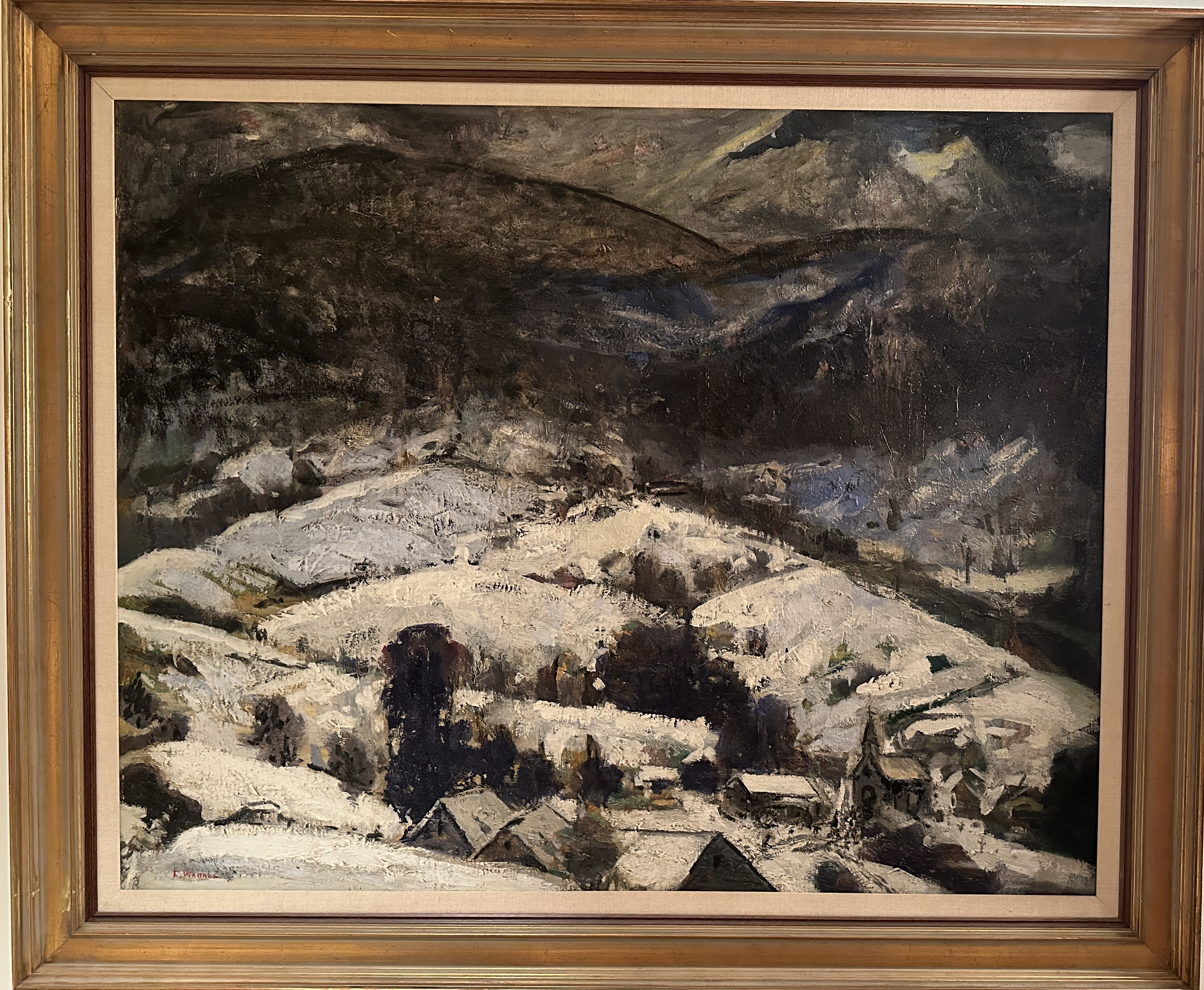
"Village in the Valley" by Fred Wagner

Frederick R. Wagner (December 20, 1860 – January 14, 1940) was one of the earliest of the Pennsylvania impressionists. He was born in Port Kennedy, Pennsylvania, grew up in Norristown, and spent most of his life in Philadelphia painting its harbors, bridges, parks, train stations and ports.

Wagner studied with Thomas Eakins at the Pennsylvania Academy of the Fine Arts beginning in 1878. Before he graduated, Wagner was chosen to teach alongside Eakins as Demonstrator of Anatomy starting in 1882.

Wagner's works were in the annual exhibitions of the Pennsylvania Academy first in 1882 and consistently every year from 1906 to 1940, and in the biennial exhibitions of the Corcoran Gallery of Art, Washington D.C., between 1907 and 1935. He was awarded the Pennsylvania Academy's fellowship prize in 1914, and in 1922 he won an honorable mention at the international exhibition of the Carnegie Institute in Pittsburgh.

Wagner left the Academy in 1886 to take a tour of western towns and to paint portraits.

Upon his return to Philadelphia, he worked as an illustrator for the Philadelphia Press until 1902. He was later asked to teach at PAFA's Chester Springs School, a position he held for seven years. Then he started a school in Addingham in 1912. Some of Wagner’s notable students at PAFA were: Elizabeth Washington (1871–1953) and John Weygandt (1869–1951). This school lasted more than twenty-five years, with classes eventually being conducted in the Fuller Building in Philadelphia.

Wagner married Eva Wilmot in 1913, his model for an unknown number of paintings including one titled "Smoking Lady." This was also the year of the notorious Armory Show in New York City for which two of Wagner's works were accepted.

"Wag" became a member of the Philadelphia Sketch Club in 1897 and remained a lifelong member there. Wagner was a member of the Philadelphia Art Alliance for many years and had shows devoted to his work there before and after he died.

In the summers between 1903 and 1913, Wagner lived in Island Heights, New Jersey where James Moore Bryant supported him. Bryant was an engraver Wagner had met at the Philadelphia Sketch Club. Other summers were spent in Ocean City, New Jersey where he painted portraits of his niece, Marguerite Brendlinger and her five daughters, along with ocean and beach scenes.

Fred Wagner painted all his life, and although only making a modest living as an artist, his work was entered and accepted into some of the most prestigious art exhibitions of the time. He won many awards for his work and his paintings were (or are) in numerous museums including the Philadelphia Museum of Art, Reading Museum, Woodmere Art Museum, James A. Michener Art Museum, St Louis Art Museum, Sewell E. Biggs Museum of American Art, Farnsworth Art Museum and Penn State University Museum.

Wagner's paintings are also in galleries and the homes of art collectors nationwide.
