= John L. Gihon =

American journalist

John Lawrence Gihon
- Born: 1839; Milford, New Jersey, US
- Died: September 18, 1878 (aged 38–39); Atlantic Ocean
- Occupations: Photographer, photojournalist
- Spouse: Kate Gihon

John Lawrence Gihon (April 21, 1839 – September 18, 1878) was a Philadelphia photographer, best known for establishing the Philadelphia Sketch Club, documenting the American Civil War, and producing one of the earliest baseball cards. He was a featured photographer at the 1876 Centennial Exhibition, contributing to the Philadelphia Photographer magazine, and author of the Photographic Colorists' Guide, published in 1878.

== Early years ==
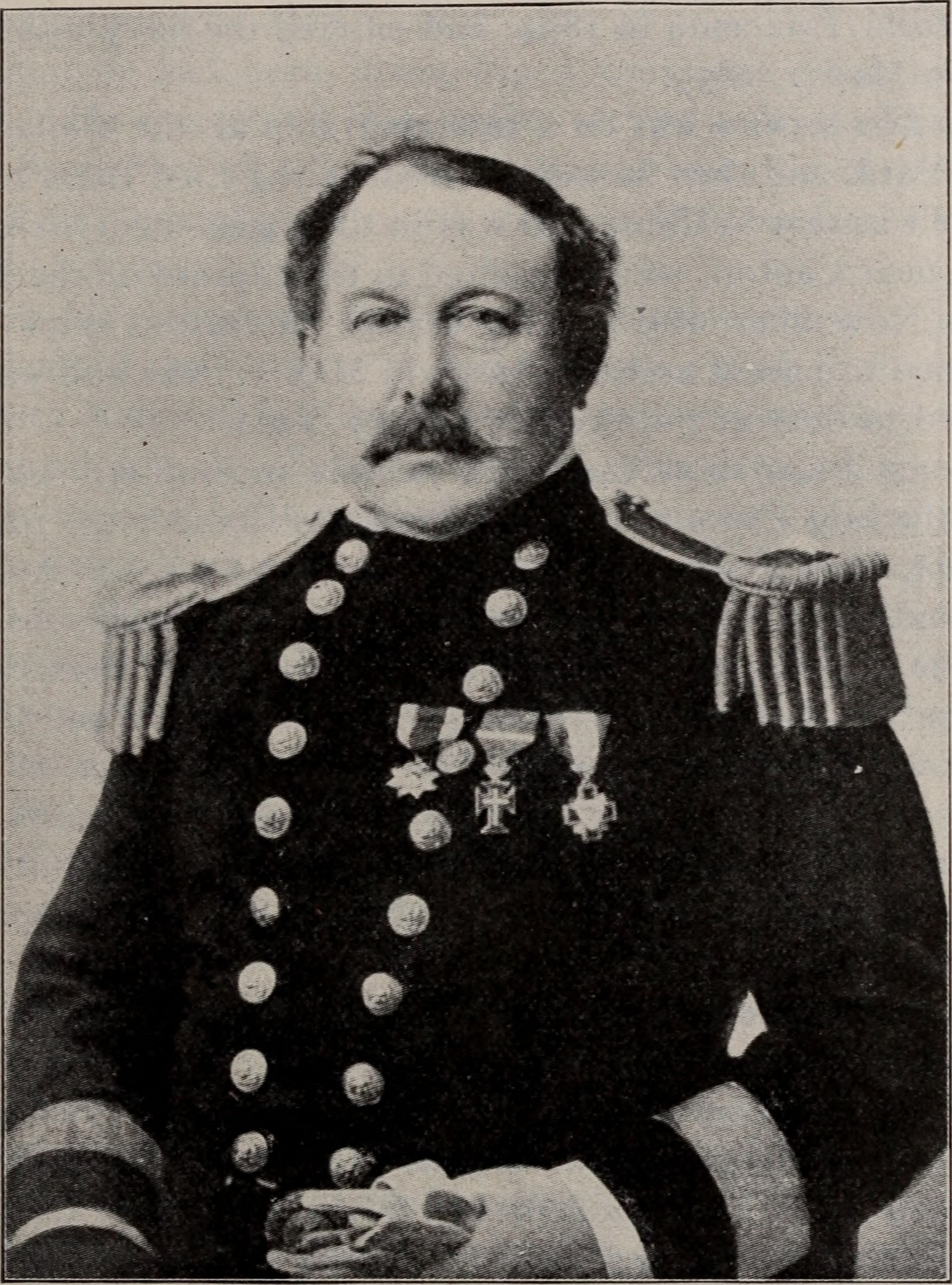
Albert Leary Gihon

John L. Gihon was born at Milford, New Jersey to parents Dr. John Hancock Gihon and Mary Jane Leary Gihon. His siblings were future Naval officer Albert Leary Gihon (1833–1901) and older sister Charlotte Gihon. The Gihon family moved to Philadelphia, Pennsylvania soon after John's birth. He attended grammar school at the Walnut Street School. In 1853, at age 14, Gihon was admitted to the Central High School.

In June 1855, he graduated at the top of his class and was subsequently nominated for admission to the United States Naval Academy. His nomination was secured by Representative Thomas Birch Florence and selected over 150 other applicants. John's brother was admitted the year previous. John Gihon's naval career was short lived. The Academy's board of surgeons rejected his application based on a "varicose condition."

In September 1856, John L. Gihon and his father headed to Lecompton, Kansas on the staff of the territorial governor, John W. Geary. His father, John H. Gihon, M.D., was the private secretary to the governor. In 1858, Gihon was admitted into the life class of the Pennsylvania Academy of Fine Arts. Soon thereafter, Gihon befriended Edward R. Morgan, nephew of the well-known Philadelphia photographer Samuel Broadbent. The two youths soon became apprentices under Broadbent.

In 1859, Gihon and Morgan opened a photographic studio at 1024 Chestnut Street, "opposite the Academy of Fine Arts, and adjoining the St. Lawrence Hotel," according to an article in the Philadelphia Photographer magazine. In 1860, Gihon co-founded the Philadelphia Sketch Club on 125 South 11th Street in Philadelphia. The Philadelphia Sketch Club is currently the oldest American artist organization still in existence.

== Civil War ==
Around the start of the Civil War, for reasons unknown, Edward Morgan left the business at 1024 Chestnut Street, leaving Gihon the sole proprietor. While other photographers ventured to battlefields, Gihon followed a different path. In 1863, he obtained permission to photograph at nearby Fort Delaware, a third-system fortification and wartime prison camp, which held more than 32,000 captured confederates.

On April 23, 1864, political prisoner Rev. Isaac W.K. Handy wrote that Gihon "was at work all day, in the casemates, photographing the faces of Confederate officers, and a few of the political prisoners. Special permission was granted by Gen. Schoepf, who selected the photographer, and sent for him, himself." By July 1864, he was granted access to the actual prison facility. Handy wrote that Gihon, "has been allowed to visit 'the pen' and has been busy, to-day, taking sundry pictures, to help the Yankee pockets, and bring joy to many a 'rebel' heart at the South."

The same day Confederate Army Capt. James Lile Lemmon, 18th Georgia Infantry, noted that the photographer "asked that we sit for our portraits & after some debate among us we agreed as there was no harm in it, but my old uniform was in rags & stained with blood & ect & unfit for a portrait & I was glad that he had among his effects a few Confederate coats one of which I put on & then set for him."

Gihon continued to photograph at Fort Delaware until 1870.

After that, he travelled to South America, and in 1873 the joined the photographic studio of Chute & Brooks, in Montevideo, Uruguay. He lived in that country a couple of years and after that he travelled to Argentina and Venezuela.

== Later years and death ==
In 1876, Gihon left his studio and joined the Centennial Photographic Co., which was solely responsible for documenting the Centennial Exhibition in Philadelphia. In every issue of the 1877 Philadelphia Photographer included Gihon's column "Rambling Remarks" The same year Gihon ventured to Monvideo, Venezuela under a photographic contract with the Calle Mining Company. While there, Gihon fell to an unknown illness. In September 1878, he boarded a vessel bound for the states. On September 18, while two days out from New York Harbor, he died. His obituary states he was buried at sea.

== Legacy ==
In 2006, fifty of his images taken at Fort Delaware were placed on auction by Cowan Auctions, Inc. The image collection "bearing the fancy imprint of 'John L. Gihon's Art Galleries' sold for $86,000. The following year, an original 1870 Philadelphia Athletics BBC Team card sold for $6,960.

== See also ==
- Bruce Mowday and Dale Fetzer, Unlikely Allies: Fort Delaware's Prison Community in the Civil War Stackpole Books, 2000.
- Laura M. Lee and Brendan Mackie wrote Images of America: Fort Delaware, Arcadia Publishers: 2010.
