= H. Lyman Saÿen =

American painter

Henry Lyman Saÿen
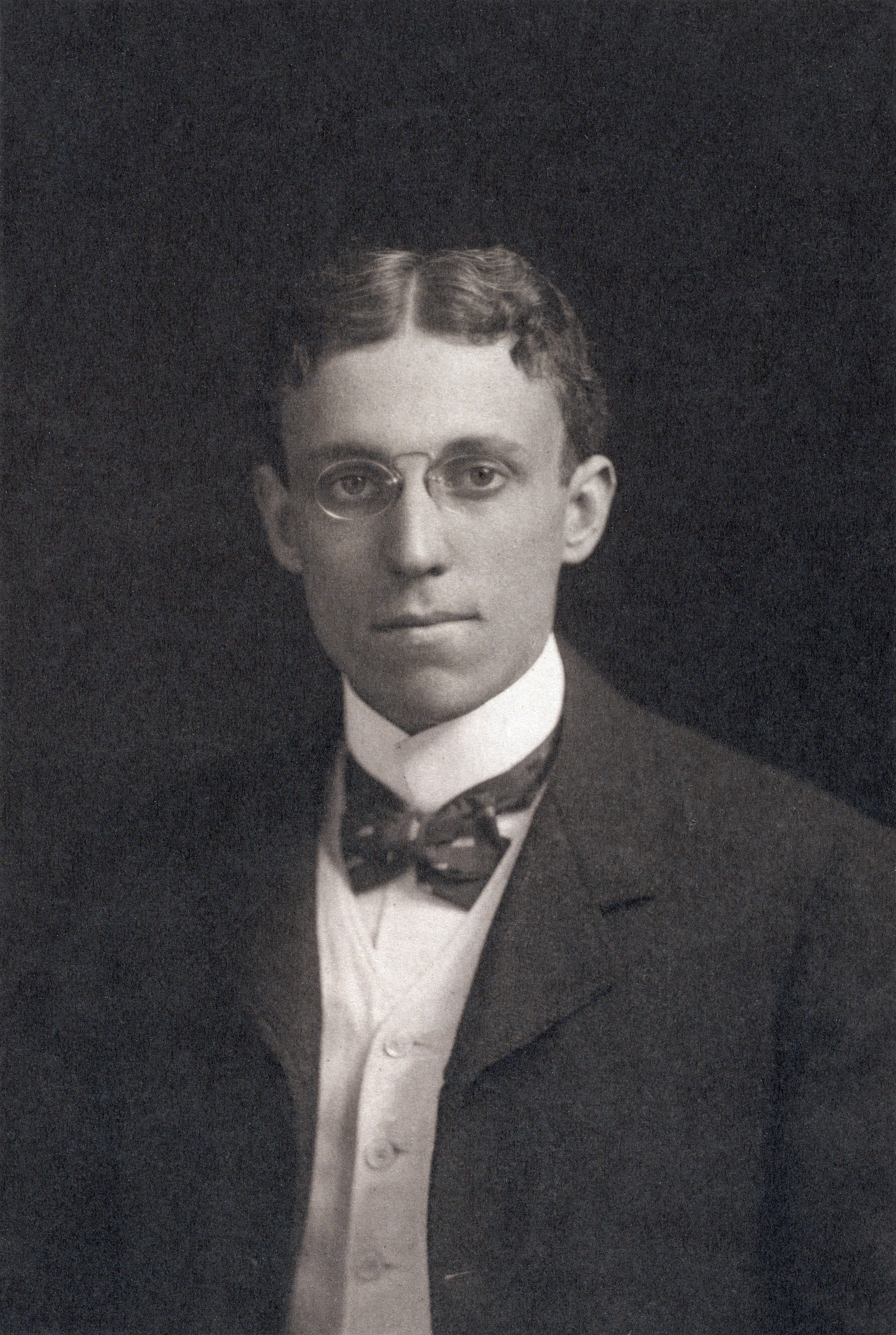
- Born: April 25, 1875; Philadelphia, Pennsylvania; United States
- Died: April 27, 1918 (aged 43); Philadelphia, Pennsylvania; United States
- Education: Central Manual Training School, Philadelphia; Pennsylvania Academy of the Fine Arts
- Known for: Painter; Engineer
- Notable work: The Thundershower; The Queen Self Regulating X-Ray Tube

H. Lyman Saÿen (sometimes also spelled Sayen) was an American pioneer in the design of x-ray tubes who also distinguished himself as an abstract artist.

== Biography ==
=== Early years ===
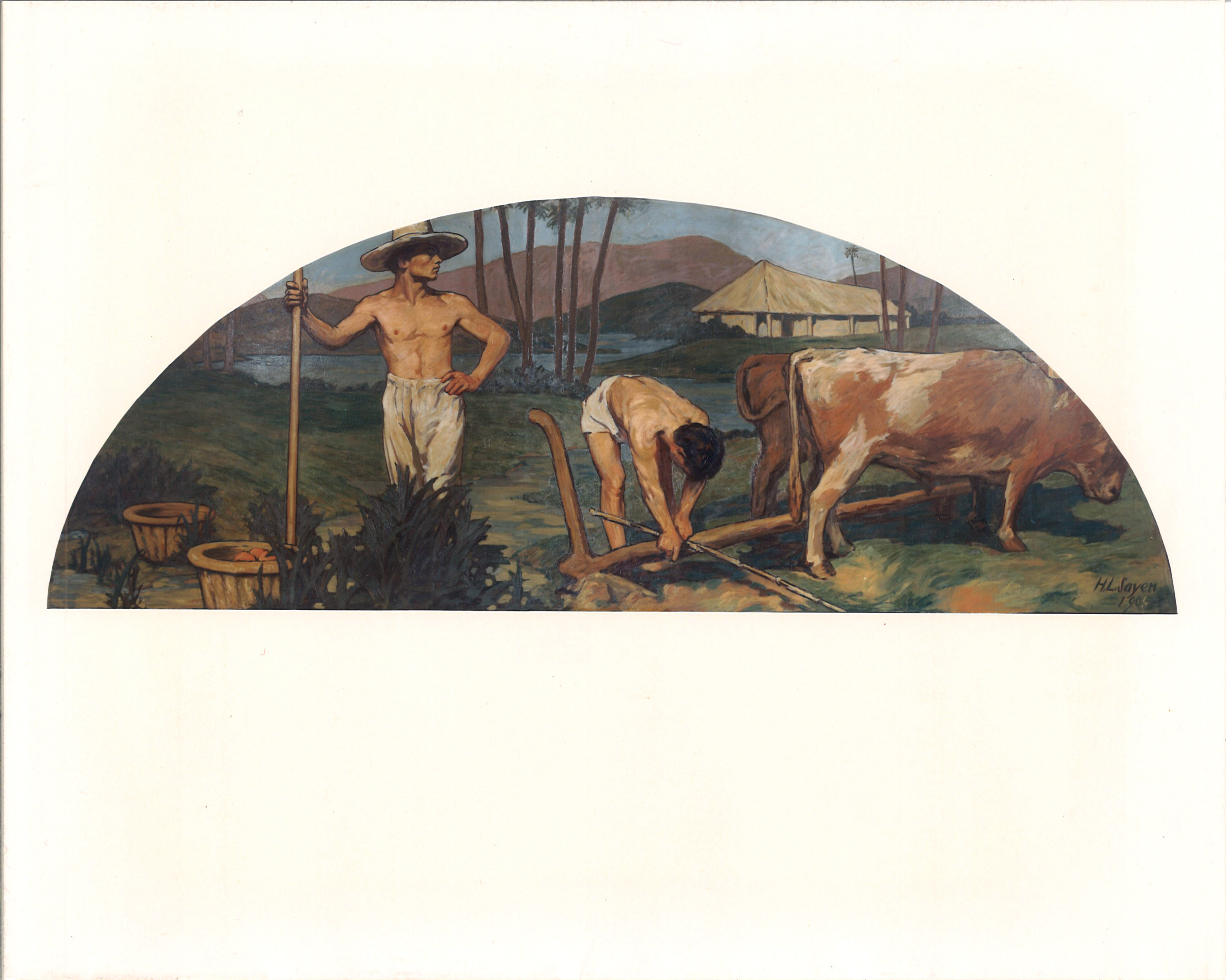
Primitive Agriculture by Henry Lyman Saÿen located in Room H-143 of the US Capitol. Photo courtesy of the Architect of the Capitol.

Saÿen was born in Philadelphia on 25 April 1875 to Edward M. Saÿen and Annie T. Saÿen (née Thomas). Soon after graduating from Central Manual Training School in 1891, he went to work for James W. Queen & Company, a large manufacturer of scientific equipment. He distinguished himself at the age of 18 by designing a large induction coil that was cited at the World's Columbian Exposition of 1893. In 1897 he received a patent for a self-regulating x-ray tube. This tube was the first of its kind to solve the problem of an unstable output caused by a drop in tube gas pressure. At the outbreak of the Spanish–American War, he volunteered for military service and was assigned to Fort McPherson, Georgia where he was put in charge of the medical x-ray laboratory. After contracting typhoid fever he was discharged from the army in 1898 and returned to Philadelphia where he resumed his work with James W. Queen & Company. The following year he enrolled in the Pennsylvania Academy of Fine Arts where he studied under Thomas Anshutz. In 1903 he married Jeannette Hope, also a student at the Pennsylvania Academy of the Fine Arts. In 1903 he was awarded a commission for the design of four lunettes to be hung in the United States Capitol. These lunettes, titled Rule of Tyranny, Rule of Justice, Primitive Agriculture, and Good Government were installed in Room H-143 between 1904 and 1905

=== Paris ===
In 1906, Saÿen and his wife moved to Paris. She had been hired to report on French fashions for The North American, a newspaper owned by Thomas Wanamaker; Saÿen was to contribute art for the printing of catalogs and posters for the Wanamaker's department stores owned by Rodman Wanamaker. Soon after arriving in Paris, the couple met Leo Stein at Le Dôme Café, a restaurant known at the time as a gathering place for Anglo-American intellectuals. They lived on the Boulevard Raspail, across from the photo studio of Edward Steichen. They soon developed friendships with many important figures in the art world including Henri Matisse and Pablo Picasso. The couple also became frequent members of Gertrude Stein's Saturday night salon. In fact, Saÿen is mentioned by name three times in The Autobiography of Alice B. Toklas. One example that acknowledges his technical skill:

... gas had just been put in and an ingenious American painter named Sayen, to divert his mind from the birth of his first child, was arranging some mechanical contrivance that would light the high fixtures by themselves.

Their only child, Ann, was born in 1912. With the beginning of the World War I, the young family was forced to return to Philadelphia in August 1914.

=== Philadelphia ===
After returning to the United States, Saÿen terminated his part of the contract with Wanamaker's to focus on his art while his wife, Jeannette, was welcomed back to The North American as a fashion journalist. Saÿen became heavily involved with the emerging American modern art movement while staying engaged with technical issues. He held one-man exhibitions at the Philadelphia Sketch Club in 1914 and again in 1916. Along with fellow Philadelphia Modernist Morton L. Schamberg, he organized the first exhibition of Modern Art in Philadelphia at the McClees Gallery on Walnut Street in 1916, introducing Philadelphians to works by Marcel Duchamp, Henri Matisse, Pablo Picasso, Man Ray, and Georges Braque, among others. He died in his home at the very early age of 43, a victim of the 1918 Influenza Pandemic.

== Self-regulating x-ray tube ==
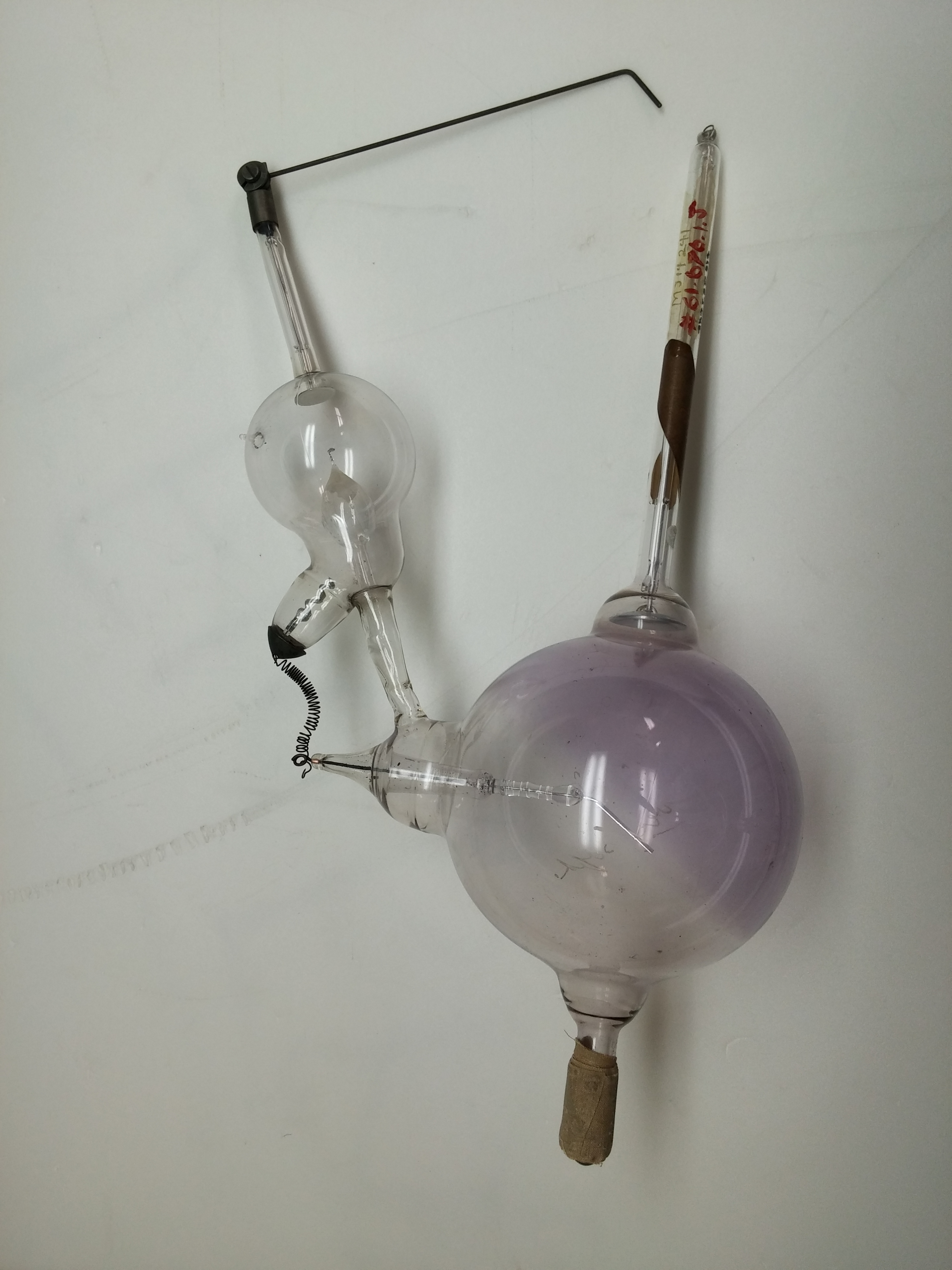
An example of the X-ray tube designed and patented by Saÿen while he was working for the James W. Queen & Company. Photo courtesy of the National Museum of American History.

Artwork appearing in several James W. Queen & Co. catalogs in the early 1900s. The drawing is probably by Saÿen. Photo courtesy of the National Museum of American History.

X-rays are generated when high energy electrons are stopped by a hard target. In the earliest tubes, the electrons were generated by the collision of positive ions with the cathode. To produce the ions, a low pressure gas had to be maintained inside the tube. Unfortunately, as this type of tube is used, the low pressure gas is gradually depleted causing the tube current and therefore the x-ray output to fall. The operator could compensate for this by increasing the voltage on the tube, but this would produce "harder" or more penetrating x-rays. In many cases this degraded the image quality. One early solution was to introduce a small amount of gas back into the tube. Unfortunately this procedure was difficult to control and it only provided a temporary solution. Saÿen's design solved this problem by a clever strategy that ensured a constant gas pressure in the tube. As the gas in the main part of the Saÿen tube (see photo) is depleted, the electrical resistance in the tube would increase causing the current to take a lower resistance path: a spark through the air gap to the wire leading to the smaller bulb. That current would heat the material in the small bulb and cause it to release gas back into the main tube. Once the gas pressure rose in the main tube, its electrical resistance would drop back into normal operating range. The gas pressure in the tube could be adjusted by controlling the size of the air gap: a larger gap meant that the tube would operate at a higher voltage with harder (higher energy, more penetrating) x-rays. Saÿen used potash (potassium hydroxide, KOH) in the side bulb but other chemicals that would outgas when heated were also used. James W. Queen & Company manufactured and sold the "Queen Self Regulating X-Ray Tube" for several years.

== Mobile x-ray ambulance ==
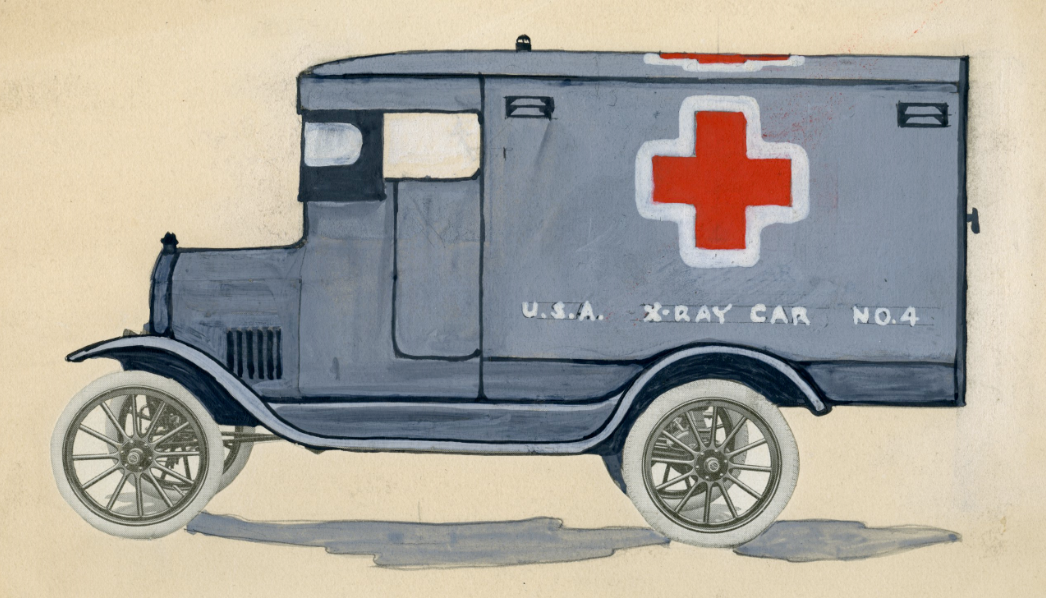
Henry Lyman Saÿen's drawing of his proposed X-ray ambulance. The ambulance was to be used by American volunteers in France. Photo courtesy of the National Museum of American History.

During the Spanish–American War, Saÿen was assigned to the army hospital at Ft McPherson, Georgia. In a brief article published at the end of that war, Saÿen described his military service, the status of medical x-rays in the Army at that time, and also proposed the construction of a mule-driven x-ray laboratory for field use. This proposal was never implemented. In 1917, as the United States drifted towards war once again, Saÿen updated his 1898 concept to an "Automobile X-Ray Unit". He wrote a detailed proposal for five fully outfitted x-ray ambulances at an estimated cost of $2,000 apiece. They were to be sent to France in support of the volunteer force that was being organized under former president Theodore Roosevelt. The vehicles were to be privately financed and Saÿen had recruited artists from the Philadelphia Sketch Club to staff the ambulance teams. A drawing of the vehicle by Saÿen is attached (NMAH Accession file 267872). It is clear from his proposal that Saÿen had stayed up-to-date with x-ray technology because he recommended the use of the new Coolidge x-ray tube which had made the early tubes, including his own design, obsolete. Preferring to field an expeditionary force of regular army units, President Wilson declined to deploy Roosevelt's army and it was subsequently disbanded. Although Saÿen's plan for mobile military x-ray units was never realized, mobile x-ray units were designed and deployed by England, France and the United States.

== See also ==
The National Museum of American History, Smithsonian Institution holds four examples of the Queen Self-Regulating tube. The Oak Ridge Associated Universities Museum of Radiation and Radioactivity website has an excellent description of the tube and also excellent photos. There is also a brief blog posting about Sayen and his x-ray ambulance on the National Museum of American History website.
