= Philadelphia Sketch Club =

Artists' club

Coordinates: 39.94744°N 75.16160°W

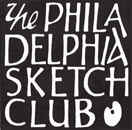
- Philadelphia Sketch Club logo

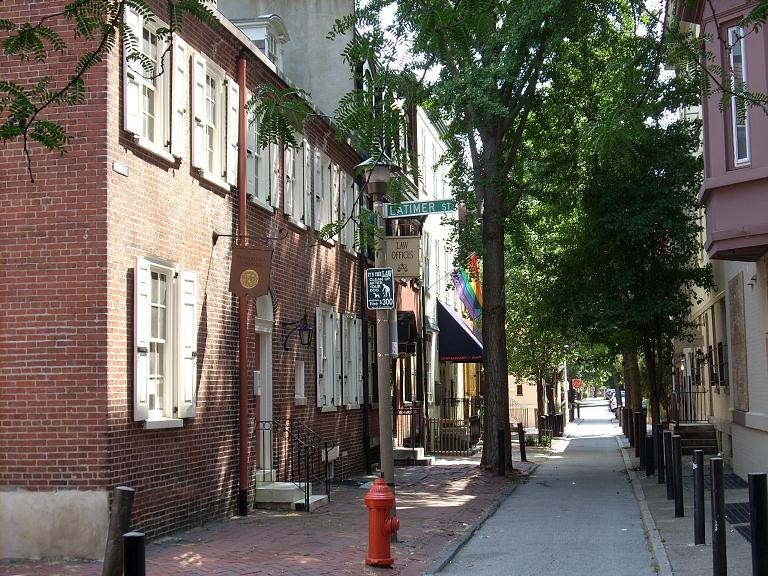
- Clubhouse, at left
- Formation: November 20, 1860; 165 years ago
- Purpose: Artists' club
- Headquarters: 235 South Camac Street, Philadelphia, PA 19107-5608
- President: Nimer "Tiger" Jaser
- Website: http://sketchclub.org

Philadelphia Register of Historic Places

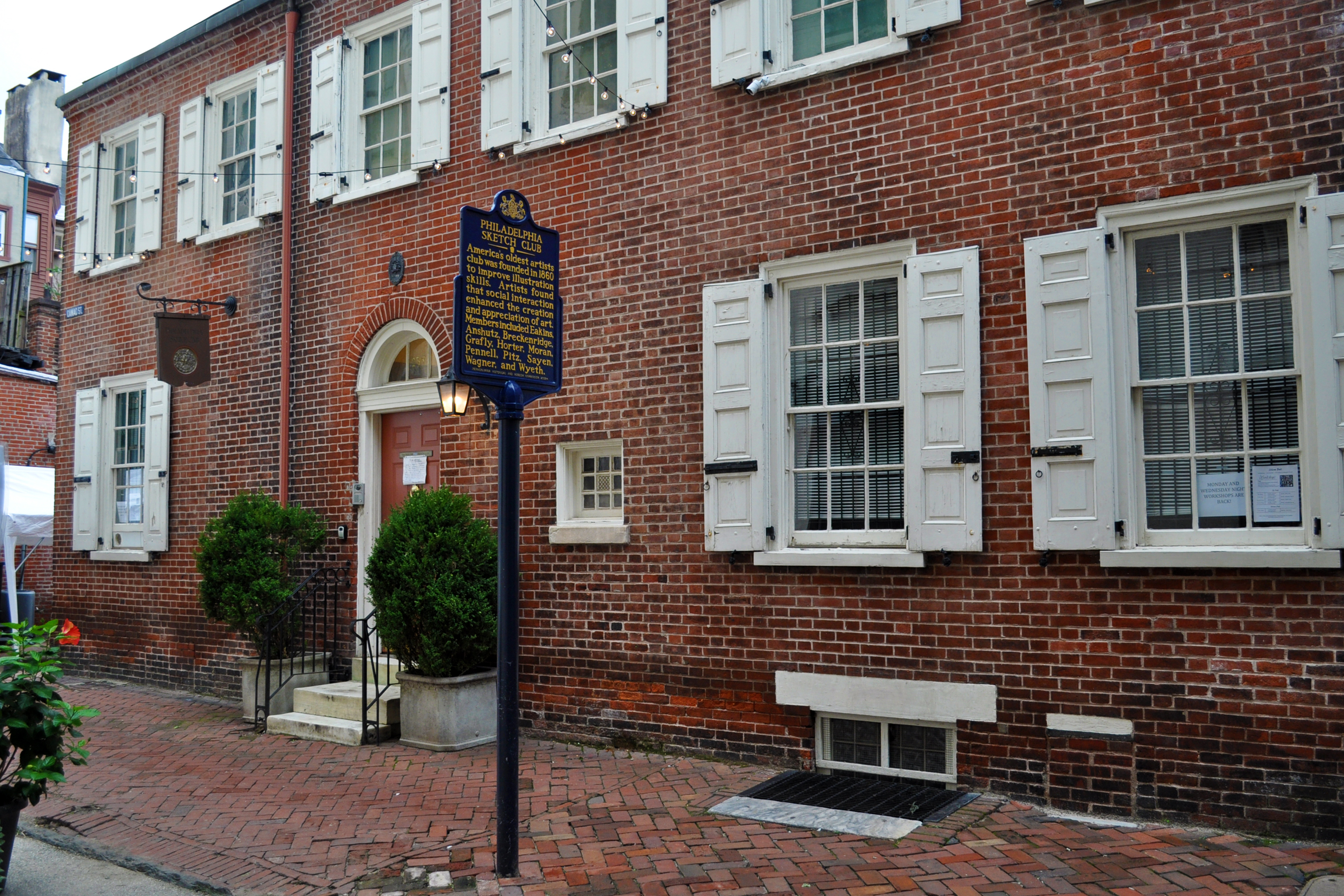
Philadelphia Sketch Club Historical Marker

The Philadelphia Sketch Club, founded on November 20, 1860, in Philadelphia, Pennsylvania, is one of America's oldest artists' clubs. The club's own web page proclaims it the oldest. Prominent members have included Joseph Pennell, Thomas Eakins, A.B. Frost, Howard Chandler Christy, and N.C. Wyeth.

The club's mission is "to provide a community for visual artists, appreciation of the visual arts and visual arts education." The club's low-cost workshops and competitions are open to the public. All interested artists are invited to apply for membership. The club's activities are sustained by gifts from members, friends and nearly 20 major foundations, corporations and historical organizations.

The club has held shows and exhibitions since its founding. Medal winners from the club's shows include Violet Oakley, John Folinsbee and Betty Bowes. In April 2008, the club held its 145th Annual Exhibition of Small Oil Paintings at the club's main gallery.

The club's art collection includes 44 portraits of members painted in the 1890s by Thomas Anshutz; more than 125 etchings by members of the Philadelphia Society of Etchers; and sculpture, stained glass, ceramics, bronze plaques, medals and metal work by its own members. The Club lends pieces to other organizations and exhibitors from time to time. The club's archives contain information from artists associated with the club.

== History ==
The Sketch Club was founded by George F. Bensell and his brother, Edmund Birckhead Bensell; Edward J. McIlhenny; Henry C. Bispham; John L. Gihon; and Robert Wylie — all students at the Pennsylvania Academy of Fine Arts, where they felt that they lacked design opportunities. Since its beginning, the club has endeavored to offer affordable life drawing classes and mount exhibitions to display local artists' work.

In 1866, the club held its first annual exhibition. The review in The New York Times began:

The impression made upon the visitor to the exhibition of paintings by the Philadelphia Sketch Club at the Derby Gallery, is one of disappointment rather than of pleasure, however modest may be his expectations before entering. True, there are in the collection a number of good paintings, and a few of more than passing merit. This, at least, might be considered guaranteed by the presence of several names in the catalogue pleasingly familiar to the connoisseur, but in a collection of over two hundred and sixty paintings exhibited, a selection doubtless from a larger number, it would not have been unreasonable to have expected a more frequent recurrence of that pleasure with which visitors linger near an occasional work of art.

The article goes on to discuss 19 of the pieces in detail and eight in passing "deserving of special mention."

Among the club's famous members was Thomas Eakins, who was the life drawing and anatomy instructor for several years until he left in 1876 to become an instructor at the Pennsylvania Academy of Fine Arts. His honorary membership was revoked in the same 1886 scandal that cost him his position at PAFA.

Thomas P. Anshutz joined the Sketch Club in 1877 and was President of the club from 1910 until his untimely death in 1912. Available for viewing, the clubhouse's upper walls of the library hold an important group of 44 portraits of early members painted by Thomas Anshutz while he was Dean of the Pennsylvania Academy of Fine Arts. Anshutz offered to paint portraits of other members with the only requirement that each sitter provide his own canvas of uniform size.

Its current clubhouse, assembled from three brick row-houses from the 1820s, is listed in the Philadelphia Register of Historic Places and the National Register of Historic Places as a contributing property to the Washington Square West Historic District.

The Sketch Club purchased two of these units in 1902 and the third in 1908. Shortly after their purchase, the first two row-houses were extensively renovated to form a single building. The third property was connected internally to the other two in 1915. The three adjoining basements formed a large Rathskeller (dining room) and kitchen. The first floor rooms include a billiard room, library, archive room, sitting room and vestibule areas. The second floor rooms and attics formed a large, sky-lit exhibition gallery and classroom.

The club has staged an annual Philadelphia District High School Students Art Exhibition since 1984; the 26th show took place February 1–21, 2010. A jury awards prizes.

== Membership ==
The Sketch Club was a male-only club for its first 130 years. Philadelphia's club for women artists, the Plastic Club, was formed in 1897. For more than 100 years these two organizations had an amiable and cooperative relationship, just three doors apart on Camac Street.

The Sketch Club received its 501(c)(3) non-profit status in early 1990. Several months after that, the club decided to begin seeking and accepting women members. Reasons behind this effort included making the club a more inclusive and modern-thinking organization, as well as the financial benefits of a larger membership base. Around this time, the Plastic Club also began accepting male members for many of the same reasons.

Today, more than 50% of the Sketch Club members are women artists. In the mid-1990s, the Sketch Club elected its first woman president, Betty MacDonald, who had also served as president of The Plastic Club.

The club's members have included artists in all mediums: illustration, painting, sculpture, architecture, photography and other forms of the visual arts. Current member Bruce H. Bentzman listed the most prominent of the club's current and former members as:

- Thomas Anshutz: Bentzman says that, at the club's Annual meeting in January 1881, William J. Clark Jr. "was again re-elected President, and the Club's award for 'the best carefully finished study' was voted to Thomas Anshutz, who was a popular member of the Club then and for many years following." Anshutz also introduced many Pennsylvania Academy of Fine Arts students into Sketch Club membership.
- Walter Emerson Baum: Baum earned an Honorable Mention from a 1939 Club exhibition. His son, Dr. Edgar Baum, won the gold medal for a landscape in the club's 1942 show.
- Peter Boyle: Boyle was a life member and he became the club president in 1949.
- Hugh Henry Breckenridge: He was a shortstop in the 1892 baseball game between the Sketch Club and the Pennsylvania Academy of Fine Arts, for the academy's team. Joined the Club two years later.
- Alexey Brodovitch: "The Club's own Edward Warwick (the elder) saw to it that Alexey came to Philadelphia and soon afterwards Alexey became a member of our Club." He was a member from 1931 to 1933.
- Henry T. Cariss: He was the Sketch Club's vice-president from 1881 to 1883. He was elected president on January 4, 1883, to 1888.
- Howard Chandler Christy: He was a member of the Philadelphia Sketch Club until 1924. "Being a great patriot, Howard Chandler Christy was one of several artists to come down from New York in April 1919 to take part in the Camac Street Carnival, an extravaganza planned by the Club's own H. Devitt Welsh to raise money for the Fifth (Victory) Liberty Bond Campaign."
- John J. Dull: Dull joined in 1895. "John Dull was a major figure in this Club, serving on its board and taking other active roles."
- Thomas Eakins: The Club invited Eakins to teach an evening sketch class for them in 1874, and made him an honorary member.
- Richard Blossom Farley: He joined in 1896 and remained a member until his death. "... involved in decorating many of the Club's affairs, a frequent exhibitor ... He did murals for the dining room of what was the new University Club in 1930, for which the architect was Grant Miles Simon, another member of our Club." He also joined other Club members in helping the military during the Great War.
- Arthur Burdett Frost: Frost was a member from 1873 to 1883
- Daniel Garber: His membership to the Philadelphia Sketch Club from 1914 to 1917.
- Frank Gasparro: Bentzman says that there is little known about Gasparro's dealings in the club.
- John H. Geiszel: He joined the Club in 1924. He served shortly as the club's Librarian.
- Hugh McMillen Hutton: He was a member of the Philadelphia Sketch Club from 1941 to 1976. His daughter, Betty MacDonald, and his granddaughter Susan Hutton DeAngelus are members of the club.
- Daniel Ridgway Knight: It was in 1864 that he joined the club. He became the club's vice-president in 1865.
- Dr. R. Tait McKenzie: "That very year he arrived in Philadelphia, having accepted the position at the University of Pennsylvania as Director of Physical Education, he would become a member of our Club, and he would be a member for life."
- Peter Moran: His older brother, Edward was briefly the club's vice-president. Peter learned how to paint from Edward, who also taught their brother Thomas. Thomas was also a member of the club.
- George Spencer Morris (1867–1922): Architect trained at the Drexel Institute and the Pennsylvania Academy of Fine Arts. Apprenticed with Addison Hutton, Cope & Stewardson and Walter Smedley, and formed the architecture firm of Morris & Erskine ca. 1909. Active on the board of the Sketch Club and also a founding member of the Delaware Valley Ornithological Club in 1890.
- John Nemeth: He joined the Club in 1951. Bentzman notes Nemeth's various positions: "John took turns at being the Portfolio's Editor, the Club's Vice President and President, Juried Print Chair, Membership Chair, Publicity Chair, Presentation Chairman of the 135th Anniversary Pennell Medal (given to Edmund Bacon, City Planner), and was at his death the Archives Chairman."
- Adam Pietz: Bentzman writes, "He joined the Sketch Club when the club rooms were on the top floor at Eleventh and Walnut Streets, and there is still around the Club an old steel letterhead die, with the Club seal and the words "11th and Walnut, Phila., Pa." on a ribbon, which Adam engraved shortly after he joined. ... In 1960, a labor of love in his 87th year, he designed and executed the Sketch Club's Hundredth Anniversary Medal."
- Henry C. Pitz: Pitz joined the Philadelphia Sketch Club in 1917. In 1935, he became the Club's President.
- Edward Willis Redfield: He was a student at the Pennsylvania Academy of Fine Arts of Sketch Club members Thomas Anshutz and James Philip Kelley.
- Norman Guthrie Rudolph: He was a student of John Dull, Daniel Garber, Thorton Oakley, and Fred Wagner. He was a member of the Philadelphia Sketch Club from 1922 to 1973.
- H. Lyman Saÿen: Member of the Club from 1902 until his death in 1918. Born in 1875. Studied under Matisse.
- Earl Shinn: Indeed, Edward Strahan is a pseudonym for Earl Shinn (1837–1886), one of the founding members of our Club where he was much appreciated as a singer of comic songs. He is one of sixteen names that signed the Club's constitution in 1861 and served as the Club's secretary from September 1862 until March 1863.
- Henry Troth: He joined the Club in 1903. For the Camac street headquarters, Bentzman writes that Troth "painted, he installed electrical lighting, and he did carpentry. He not only worked to improve the interior of the rooms, he also contributed books to our library, was still contributing books in 1935. In November 1915, when the three Sketch Club buildings were turned into one, Henry, who had been the acting House Committee Chairman, saw to it that the Club had an ideal Steward. In his capacity as photographer, he documented Club outings. ... The Great Depression hurt many Club members. When he could no longer afford to pay the membership fees, Henry proffered his resignation. ... The irony is Henry never liked Life Memberships because they hurt the Club's treasury. He had worked hard to have the rules of Life Membership modified to make it harder to obtain."
- Fred Wagner -In 1923, he served briefly as the club's vice president. He was a life member and died the 14th January 1940.
- Edward Warwick: He joined the Club in 1909. His brother, Nelson D. Warwick, also joined the Club in 1915. Edward "established the Barter Show, in which the artists wrote down on a slip of paper by the work they exhibited what they would take in trade, such things as a case of can soup or a lawnmower." (Bentzman)
- N.C. Wyeth -He was a member from 1911 to 1919. Bentzman notes, "I first learned of N. C.'s November 1912 exhibition in the Club's gallery from David Michaelis's book, N. C. Wyeth: A Biography."
- Samuel Yellin: joined the Club in 1922.
