= James W. Queen & Company =

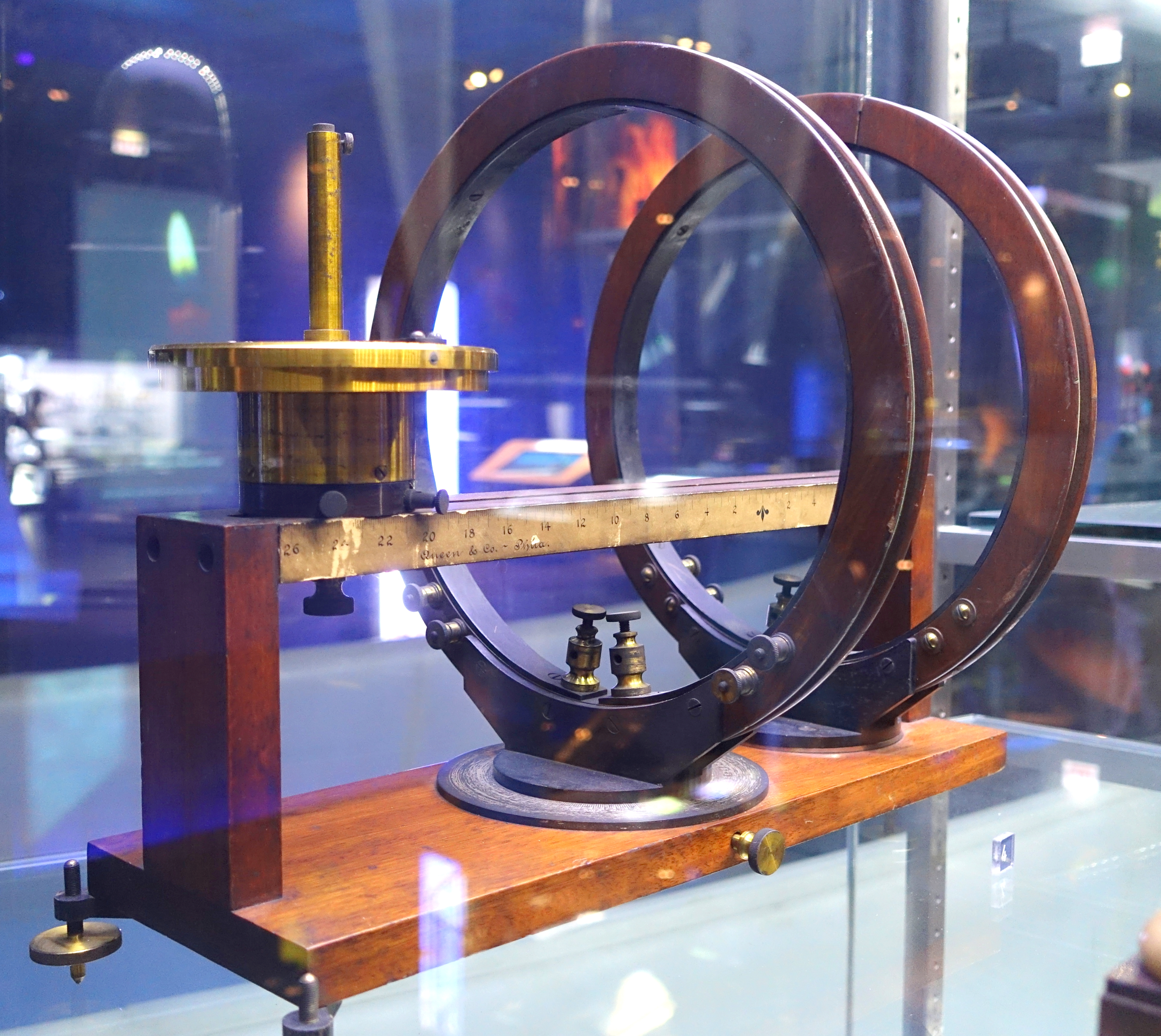
Mirror galvanometer by James W. Queen & Company

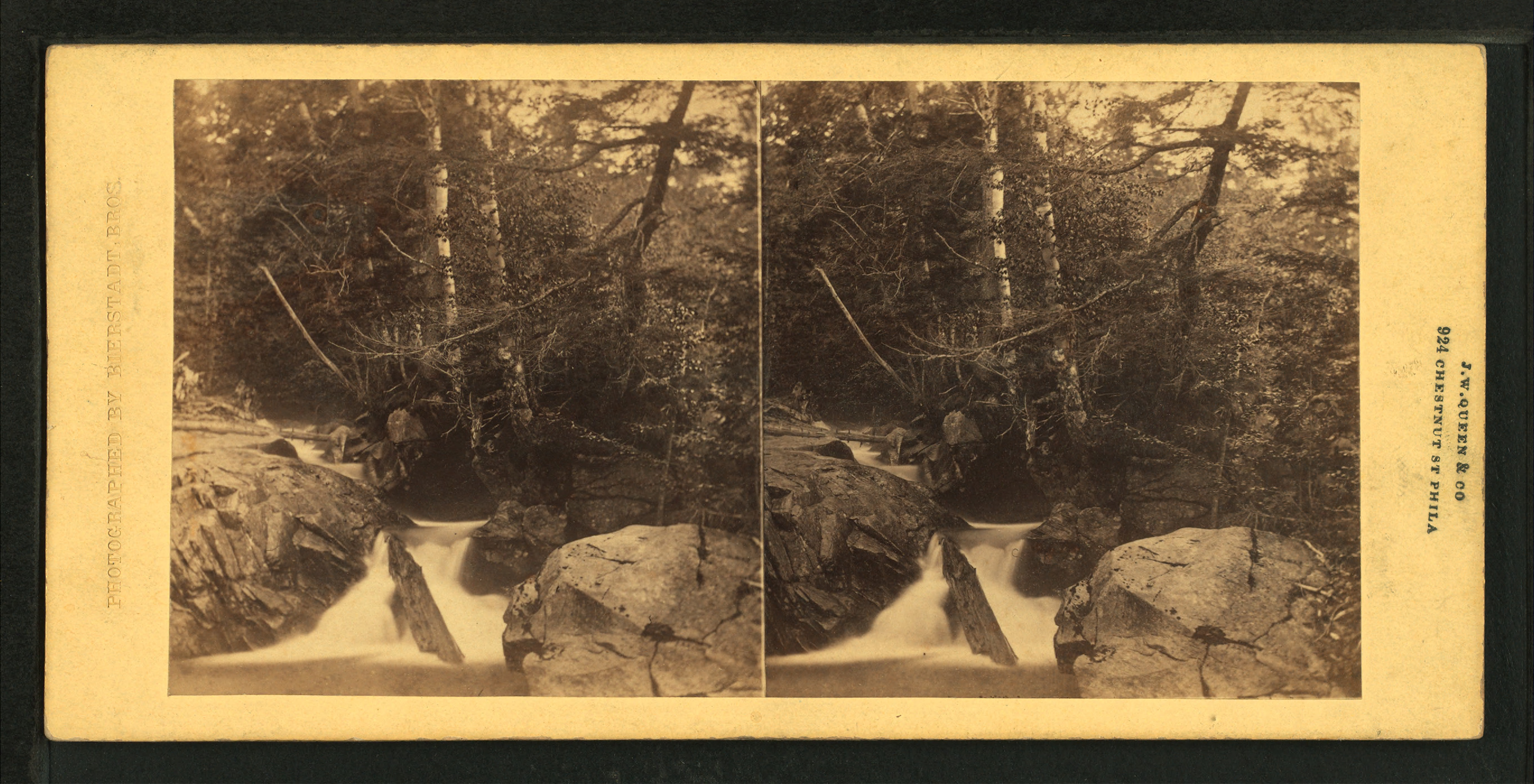
Cascade above the Basin, Franconia Mountains, N.H, by James W. Queen & Company

James W. Queen & Company was an optical and scientific instrument company located at 924 Chestnut Street, Philadelphia, Pennsylvania, with a branch office in New York City, and active in various forms from 1853 to 1925, and subsequently as Gray Instrument Company until 1952.

In 1853 Mr James W. Queen began in the city of Philadelphia a small business in optical and philosophical apparatus. In 1859 he joined with Mr. Samuel L. Fox, and under their personal supervision and management, the business steadily developed.

In 1870 Mr James W. Queen retired, and Mr. S.L. Fox continued the business under the title of James W. Queen & Co. It continued under this name until 1893, when it was incorporated as Queen & Co. John G. Gray reorganized the business in 1912 under the name Queen-Gray Co., and it remained that way until Mr. Gray's passing in 1925, at which point it changed its name to Gray Instrument Company.

By 1888 the company had six departments:

- physical and chemical
- engineering
- ophthalmic
- microscopical
- magic lantern
- photographic

Among the instruments and apparatus made were air pumps, astronomical instruments, induction coils, Holtz machines, gyroscopes, drawing and mathematical instruments, surveying instruments, and instruments for electrical measurements. In 1901 Queen and Co. manufactured a large induction coil for the Japanese government that could create sparks 32 inches long, to be used for wireless telegraphy.

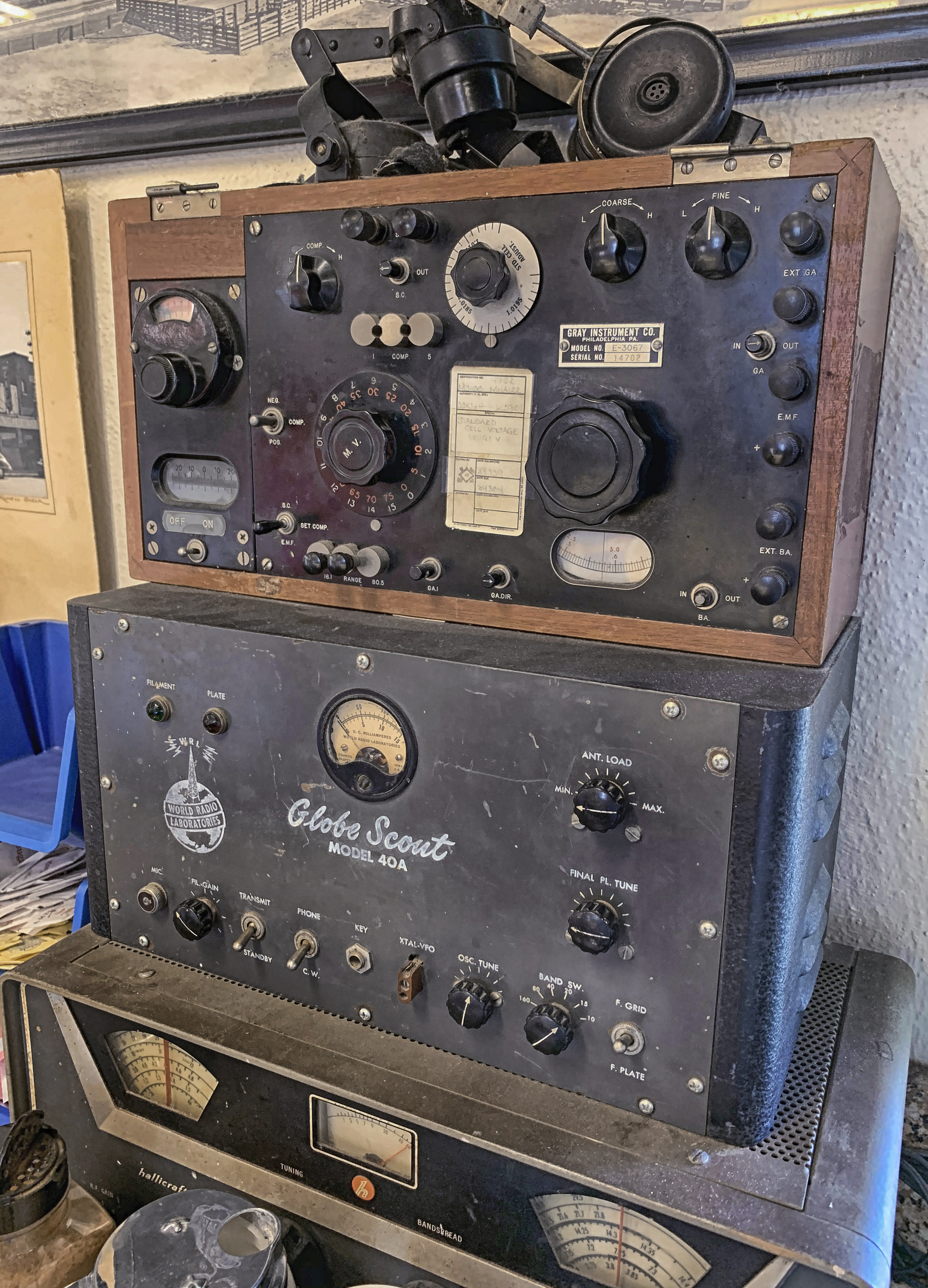
Gray Instrument-Globe Scout Cluster
