= Ellen Wetherald Ahrens =

American artist

- Born: June 5, 1859; Baltimore, Maryland
- Died: October 31, 1935 (aged 76); Lansdowne, Pennsylvania
- Known for: Illustration, miniature painting, stained glass

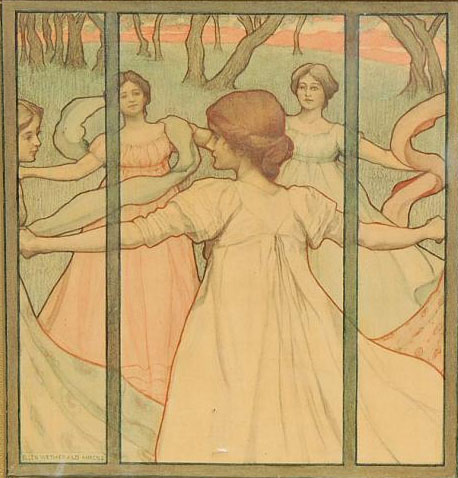
Watercolor and charcoal illustration

Ellen Wetherald Ahrens (June 6, 1859 – October 31, 1935) was an American artist. Best known for her book illustrations, she was also a miniature painter and stained glass artist.

== Biography ==
Ahrens was born on June 6, 1859, in Baltimore, Maryland. She studied under Emil Otto Grundmann and Benjamin Champney at the Boston Museum of Fine Art, and also under Thomas Eakins at the Pennsylvania Academy of the Fine Arts and Howard Pyle at the Drexel Institute. Ahrens exhibited her work in national competitions. In 1884 she won the Second Toppan prize at the Pennsylvania Academy of the Fine Arts. In 1902 she won a silver medal at the Carnegie Institute. In 1904 she received a bronze medal at the Louisiana Purchase Exposition.

For a time, at the turn of the century, Ahrens worked at the studio of the Red Rose Girls (Violet Oakley, Jessie Willcox Smith, and Elizabeth Shippen Green) in the Love Building in Philadelphia.

Ahrens' best-known book illustrations are for the 1902 edition of A Maid of Bar Harbor by Henrietta G. Rowe and the 1906 edition of Jo's Boys by Louisa May Alcott. Examples of her miniature painting are in the collection of the Philadelphia Museum of Art, including a 1902 portrait of Evelyn Nesbit. The Nasher Museum of Art owns a portrait of Eakins' sister. Ahrens was also known for her stained glass design.

Ahrens died on October 31, 1935, in Lansdowne, Pennsylvania.
