= Red Rose Girls =

American artist collective

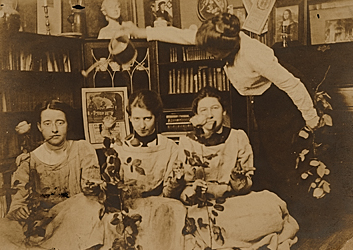
From left to right: Elizabeth Shippen Green, Violet Oakley, Jessie Willcox Smith, Henrietta Cozens; c. 1901

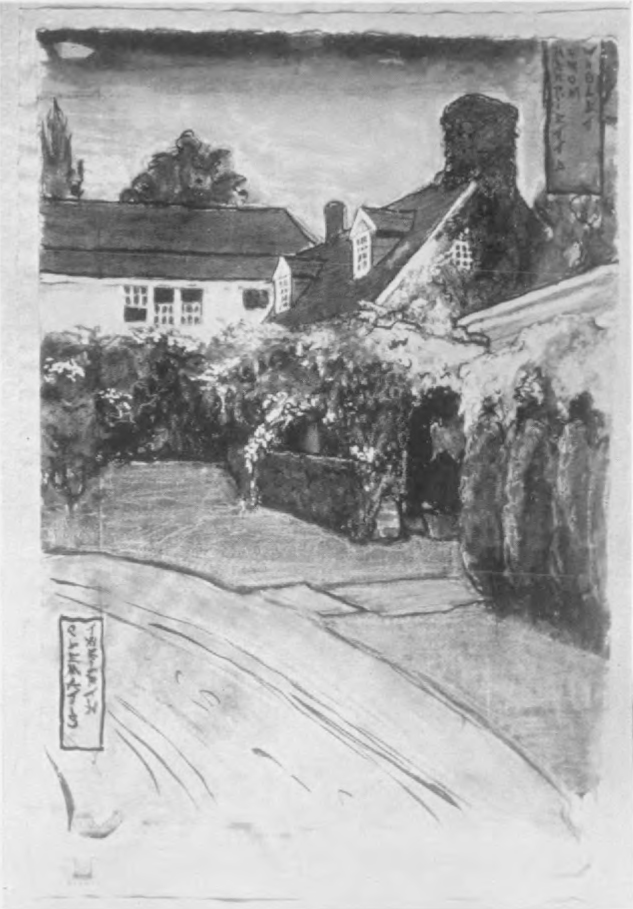
The Red Rose by Violet Oakley, 1905

The Red Rose Girls were a group of female artists from Philadelphia, Pennsylvania, active in the early 1900s. The work of the three working artists in the group, Violet Oakley, Jessie Willcox Smith, and Elizabeth Shippen Green, was supported by Henrietta Cozens, who took on the responsibility of managing their communal household. They rented the Red Rose Inn in Villanova, Pennsylvania, in Mainline Philadelphia from 1901 to 1906, before moving to Cogslea in Mount Airy, Philadelphia from 1906 to 1911.

The Red Rose Girls were given their nickname by Howard Pyle, who taught the three artists in his first illustration class at Drexel Institute. Prolific and highly successful as artists, the Red Rose Girls were exemplars of the artistic style of Romantic realism. They helped to establish Philadelphia as a national center for book and magazine illustration. Their unconventional life style as a group of young female artists living together received criticism at the time but also demonstrated that women could become successful professional artists, serving as a model for later women.

== Young Female Artist Group ==
The three girls' choice to live together on an inn and studio in the suburb of Philadelphia was a bold act in the 1910s, consistent with the feminist ideal of the “New Woman”. The Red Rose girls received several criticisms for their "untraditional" living arrangements. Their formation of a close familial group for mutual support was influenced in part by Howard Pyle's outspoken opinion that once a woman married "that was the end of her" professionally. Pyle was not the only person to emphasize the difficulty, for a woman, of managing both family and professional commitments. Anna Lea Merritt, a member of The Plastic Club, wrote in Lippincott's Magazine, that "The chief obstacle to a woman's success is that she can never have a wife... It is exceedingly difficult to be an artist without this time-saving help."

Alice Carter, author of The Red Rose Girls: An Uncommon Story of Art and Love describes their work and relationships in detail. The activities of Henrietta Cozens, who took on the role of "wife" in the day-to-day management of the household, were both important and recognized by the other members of the group. Throughout their years together the four women formed intimate bonds of friendship and love and enriched each other's professional lives by sharing ideas and inspiration. The group disbanded in 1911 after Elizabeth Shippen Green married following a seven-year engagement.

== Romantic Realism and Pre-War Era ==
According to Dr. Mark Sullivan, PhD in the Art History Department at Bryn Mawr College and professor of Art History at Villanova University, the artistic style of the “Red Rose Girls” could be categorized as “romantic realism,” a combination of Romanticism and Realism, two popular art styles in the end of 19th century and at the beginning of 20th century. The Red Rose Girls could be said to represent one of the peaks of the artistic style of Romantic realism, although the popularity of the style declined in American High Art circles after the group was active, due to the dominance of Abstract Expressionism in the Post War era.

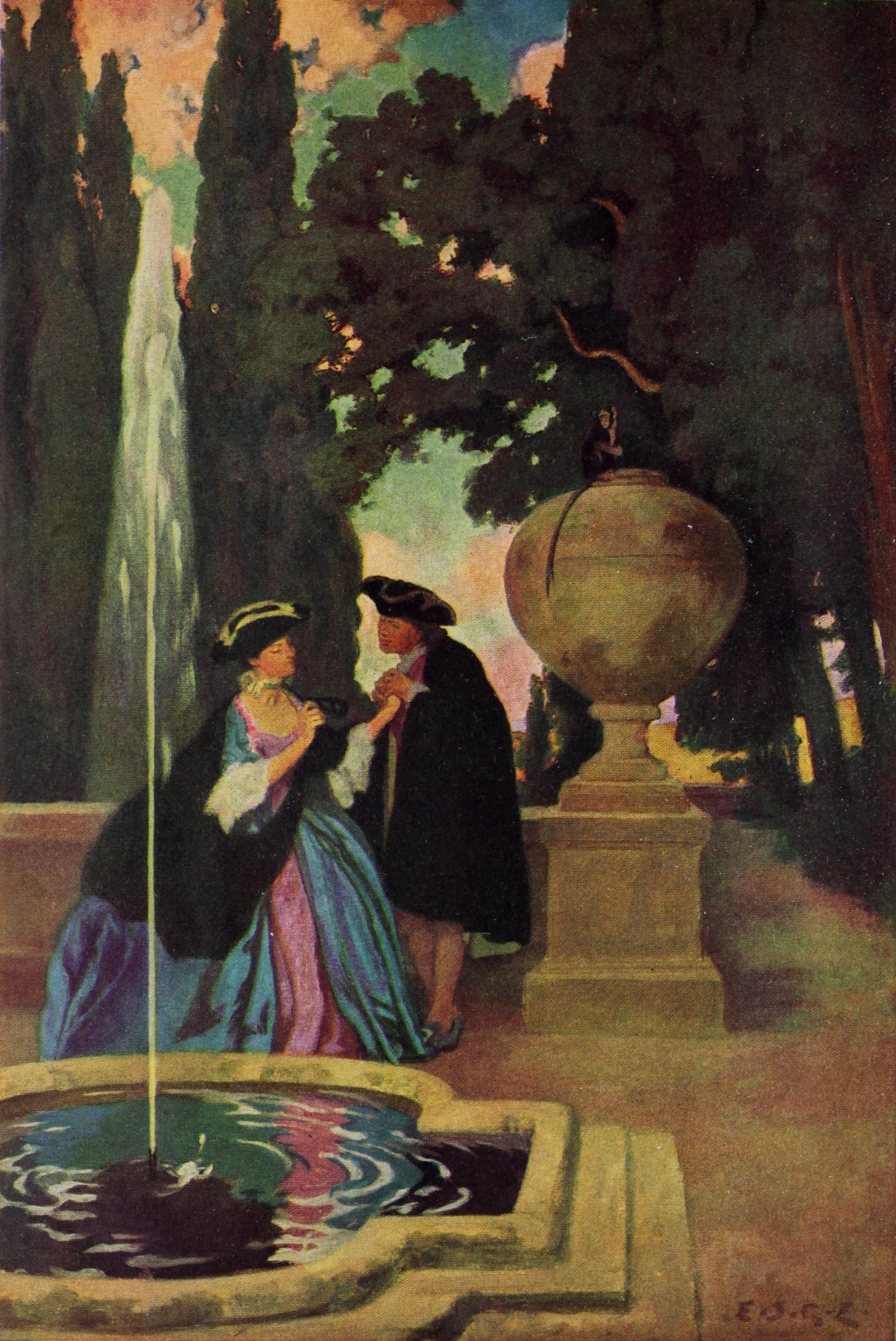
September 1922 Cover of Harper's Magazine by Elizabeth Shippen Green

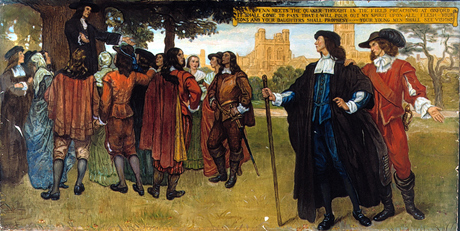
Penn meets the Quaker, public mural from the Capitol building in Harrisburg by Violet Oakley

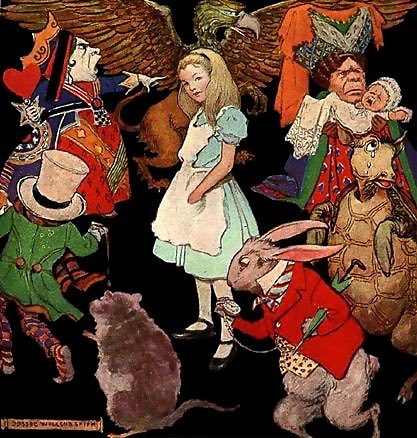
From the cover of Nora Archibald Smith's book Boys and Girls of Bookland (1923), illustrated by Jessie Willcox Smith

== Careers ==
Their works achieved great success. Oakley began as an illustrator and was acclaimed for her large mural projects and works in stained glass. Smith and Green were prolific illustrators, celebrated for their work in children's books and periodicals such as Collier's, Scribner's Magazine, and Harper's Magazine.

== Exhibition ==
A group show featuring the work of the Red Rose Girls occurred at the Norman Rockwell Museum from November 8, 2003, through May 31, 2004. Works from the Red Rose Girls were featured in the American Watercolor show at the Philadelphia Museum of Art in 2017.
