= Plays and Players Theatre =

Theatre company and social club in Philadelphia, PA, US

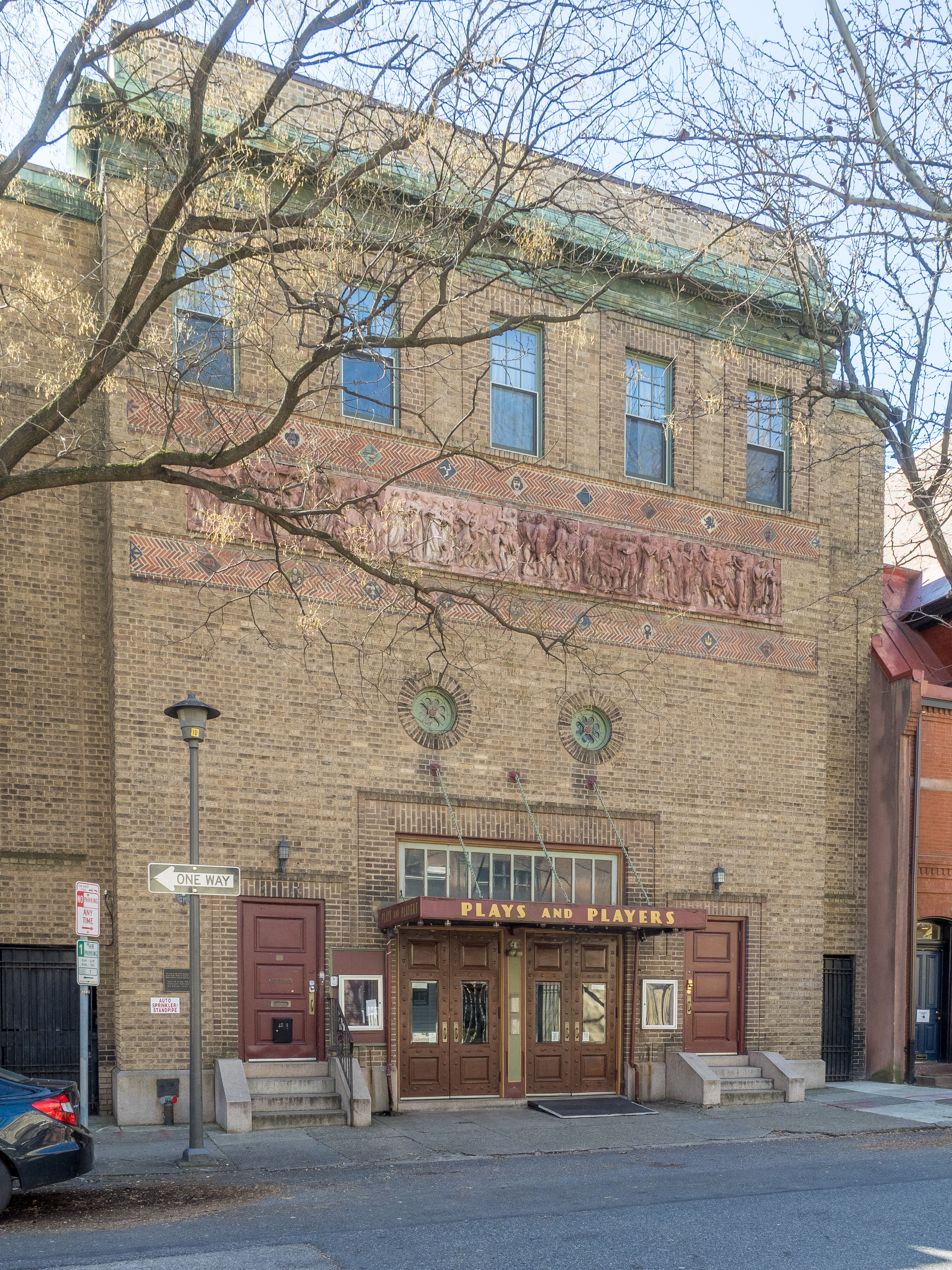
- Plays and Players Theatre in March 2024
- Interactive map of Plays and Players Theatre
- Address: 1714 Delancey St. Philadelphia, Pennsylvania; United States
- Capacity: theatre: 290 black box: 65
- Type: Regional theatre

Construction
- Opened: 1913

Website
- www.playsandplayers.org
- Plays and Players
- U.S. National Register of Historic Places
- Location within Philadelphia Location within Pennsylvania Location within the United States
- Coordinates: 39°56′49″N 75°10′14″W
- Built: 1911
- Architect: Amos W. Barnes
- NRHP reference No.: 73001665
- Added to NRHP: March 14, 1973

Plays and Players Theatre is a theater and social club in Philadelphia, Pennsylvania. Founded in 1911, it is one of the oldest professional theater companies in the United States. The theater building was designed and constructed in 1912 by Philadelphia architect Amos W. Barnes as a dramatic school, but soon was used as a theater for Broadway theatre tryouts, known as the Playhouse.

The theater company Plays and Players bought the building in 1922 and has performed there ever since. Murals were added in 1923 by American artist Edith Emerson.

== History ==
Plays & Players began in 1911 as a social club devoted to expanding and developing new theater experiences for and by its membership. The first President, Maud Durbin Skinner, was the wife of famed American actor Otis Skinner. The Plays & Players Theatre, then called the "Little Theatre of Philadelphia," first opened its doors two years later, in 1913. The theater was founded by Beulah E. Jay and her husband Edward G. Jay, Jr. with acquaintance F.H. Shelton in an effort to produce "American plays of ideas," an underrepresented genre at the time.

In April 1919, the First Korean Congress, a conference that advocated for the restoration of Korean independence, was held at the theatre.

Plays & Players theater company has produced notable performances, including the world premiere of the acclaimed Broadway play "Stalag 17" in 1949, and a childhood performance by actor Kevin Bacon in Member of the Wedding in 1974. The first season of Plays & Players included An Ideal Husband by Oscar Wilde and The Learned Ladies by Molière, both which remain popular plays.

On March 14, 1973, Plays & Players Theatre was entered in the National Register of Historic Places.

Philadelphia Theatre Company staged plays at Plays and Players from 1982 until the Suzanne Roberts Theatre opened in 2007.

In 2019, the centennial celebration of the First Korean Congress was held at the theatre. The centennial celebration was recognized by the Philadelphia City Council.
