= Helen Leah Reed =

Canadian-born American writer (1861/62–1926)

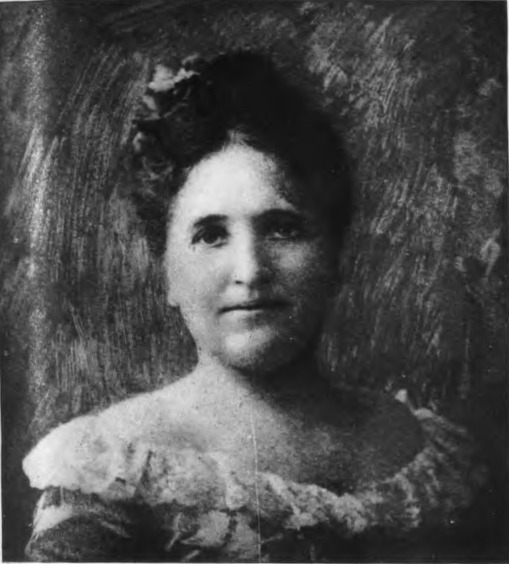
- Reed in 1908
- Born: March 13, 1861/62; St. John, New Brunswick, Canada
- Died: July 21, 1926; Manchester, Massachusetts, U.S.
- Education: Radcliffe College
- Occupation: writer
- Writing career
- Genres: essays; periodical literature; poetry; novels; historical stories
- Notable work: Brenda series
- Notable awards: Sargent Prize, from Harvard University

Helen Leah Reed (1861/62 – 1926) was a Canadian-born American author. An essayist, a contributor to periodical literature, and the author of a volume of poems, a novel, and a series of historical stories for girls, she was also interested in education and philanthropy.

== Early life and education ==
Helen Leah Reed was born in St. John, New Brunswick, Canada, March 13, 1861/62. Her parents were Dr. Guilford Shaw and Ella (Berryman) Reed. Her father was born at Wilmot, Nova Scotia, and died at Cambridge, Massachusetts in 1908. He was the son of Granville Bevil and Leah (Green) Reed of Nova Scotia. He was of New England ancestry, and his Reed forbears, who were Loyalists, had migrated to Nova Scotia in the epoch of the Revolution. Helen traced her ancestry also to Roger Williams and to the Greene family of Rhode Island and other Colonial families. Her mother was the daughter of John Berryman of St. John, granddaughter of John and Catharine (Edgar) Berryman of England, and the great-granddaughter of Peter and Elizabeth (Annesley) Wade of New York, who were Loyalists. Helen's parents came to Boston in 1865. Helen's siblings were: Ethel, Arthur, Edwin, Harry, John, and Catharine.

Reed studied at Radcliffe College in its early days and was admitted there to the degree of Bachelor of Arts in 1890, from which she graduated. She was a student of Latin and Greek, and in 1890, was the first woman to win the Sargent Prize, offered by Harvard University for a metrical translation from Horace, which version was published in Scribner's Magazine.

== Career ==
Reed was the author of the "Brenda books", which she was induced to undertake because of her close acquaintance with young girls and their needs. Her works included:Miss Theodora, Badger, 1898; Brenda, Her School and Her Club, Little Brown, 1900; Brenda's Summer Rockley, 1901; Brenda's Cousin Radcliffe, 1902; Brenda's Ward, 1903; Irma and Nap, 1904; Amy in Acadia, 1905; Irma in Italy, 1908; Napoleon's Young Neighbor, 1907; Serbia-a Sketch, Serbian Distress Fund, 1916; Memorial Day and Other Verse, DeWolfe & Fisk Co., 1917;

A keen student of Latin and Greek and a lover of poetry, Reed's interest in Horace continued after graduation, working on translations with an intention to publish a volume. Her published translations were selected as representative translations for the edition de luxe of Horace, prepared by the Bibliophile Society.

She was a contributor to The Springfield Republican.

Reed was a member and officer of The Folklore Society for a number of years, and belonged also to the Boston Authors Club, the Circolo Italiano, Authors' League of America, and various other organizations in the U.S. and abroad.

== Personal life ==
With the exception of ten years in Cambridge (beginning 1918), she lived almost all her life in Boston, where her parents went at the end of the Civil War.

Reed traveled widely in the U.S. and in Europe.

== Death and legacy ==
Helen Leah Reed died at Manchester, Massachusetts, at the summer home of her sister, Mrs. Everett Morss, on July 21, 1926.

In 1927, a bequest of US$1,000 was received under the will of Helen Leah Reed as a memorial to Guilford S. Reed, and was funded as the "Guilford Reed Fund", the income to be applied to the purchase of books of non-fiction.

== Awards and honours ==
- Sargent Prize, Harvard University

== Selected works ==
- The City and the Sea: With Other Cambridge Contributions in Aid of the Hospital Fund (1881)
- Miss Theodora: A West End Story (1898) illus. Florence Pearl England
- Napoleon's Young Neighbor (1907) (non-fiction)
- Memorial Day, and Other Verse (Original and Translated) (c. 1917)
- Serbia: A Sketch (c. 1917)

=== Book chapter ===
- "Women's Work at the Harvard Observatory". The National Exposition Souvenir (1893)

=== Series ===
==== Brenda ====
1. Brenda, Her School and Her Club (1900) illus. Jessie Willcox Smith
2. Brenda's Summer at Rockley (1901) illus. Jessie Willcox Smith
3. Brenda's Cousin at Radcliffe (1902)
4. Brenda's Bargain: A Story for Girls (1903)
5. Amy in Acadia: A Story for Girls (1905) illus. Katharine Pyle
6. Brenda's Ward: A Sequel to Amy and Acadia (1906)

==== Irma ====
- Irma and Nap (1904)
- Irma in Italy: A Travel Story (1908)
