= Edith Emerson =

American painter (1888–1981)

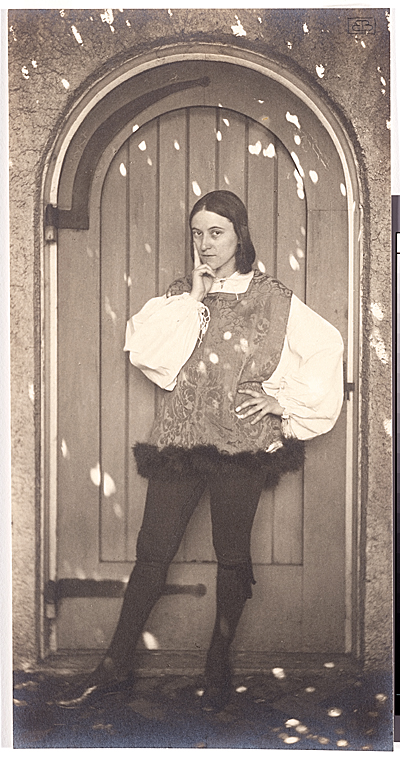
- Emerson dressed as Giovanni the Page in front of the garden door of the Pergola in 1919
- Born: July 27, 1888; Oxford, Ohio, U.S.
- Died: November 21, 1981 (aged 93); Philadelphia, Pennsylvania, U.S.
- Education: Art Institute of Chicago; Pennsylvania Academy of Fine Arts
- Known for: Painting, murals, illustrations, bookplates
- Partner: Violet Oakley

Edith Emerson (July 27, 1888 – November 21, 1981) was an American painter, muralist, illustrator, writer, and curator. She was the life partner of acclaimed muralist Violet Oakley and served as the vice-president, president, and curator of the Woodmere Art Museum in the Chestnut Hill section of Philadelphia, Pennsylvania, from 1940 to 1978.

== Early life and education ==
Emerson was born on July 27, 1888, in Oxford, Ohio. into a family of accomplished scholars and artists. Her father, Alfred Emerson, was an archaeologist and professor of classical archaeology, whose career included positions at Johns Hopkins University, Princeton University, the Art Institute of Chicago, and Cornell University. Her mother, Alice Edwards Emerson, was a pianist and music professor who taught at Wellesley College, the Ithaca Conservatory of Music and its successor, Ithaca College, the University of Chicago, Cornell University, and Hobart College. She had three siblings: Gertrude, a writer and editor of Asia magazine; Willard, a banker; and Alfred Jr., an entomologist. She traveled widely with her family to Japan, China, India, and Mexico.

Emerson began her art education at a young age, studying with Olaf Branner from the Department of Architecture at Cornell University when she was only twelve years old. By age fifteen, she had enrolled in classes at the Art Institute of Chicago, later studying with John Vanderpoel and Thomas Wood Stevens. While there, she was in charge of the circulating collection of lantern slides of art subjects.

Emerson also attended the Pennsylvania Academy of the Fine Arts in Philadelphia. Other students studying at the academy at the time included Cecilia Beaux, Violet Oakley, Hugh Breckenridge, and Daniel Garber. One of the classes Emerson attended was Oakley's mural-painting class, and found Oakley the "most stimulating...electrifying teacher, opening up undreamed of possibilities and encouraging every effort. It was exciting, especially to women students as it abolished any sense of inferiority." During her studies at the Academy, Emerson earned two Cresson Scholarships, one in 1914 and again in 1915, allowing her to travel throughout Europe. She was also awarded the Second Toppan Prize in 1916.

== Career ==
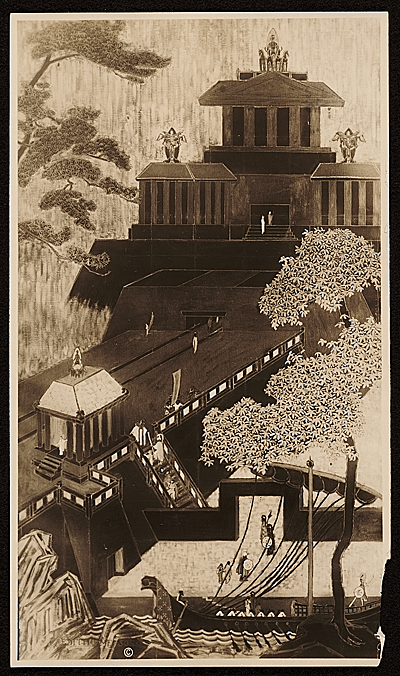
The Arrival of the Athenian Tribute in Crete, panel (1) The Little Theatre Philadelphia by Emerson

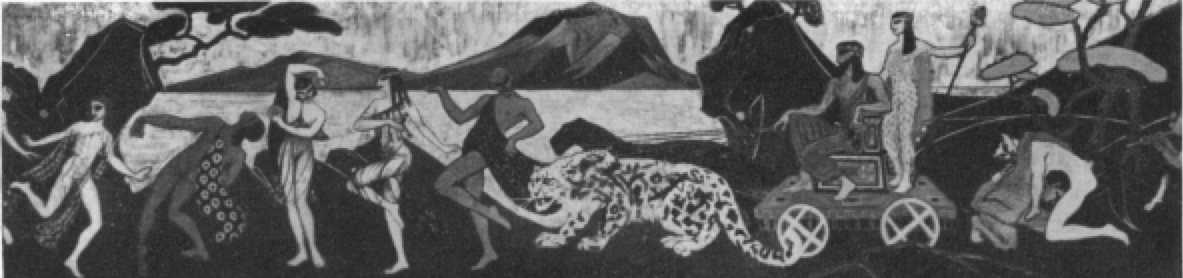
Partial panel of the marriage of Dionysius and Ariadne at the Little Theatre in Philadelphia

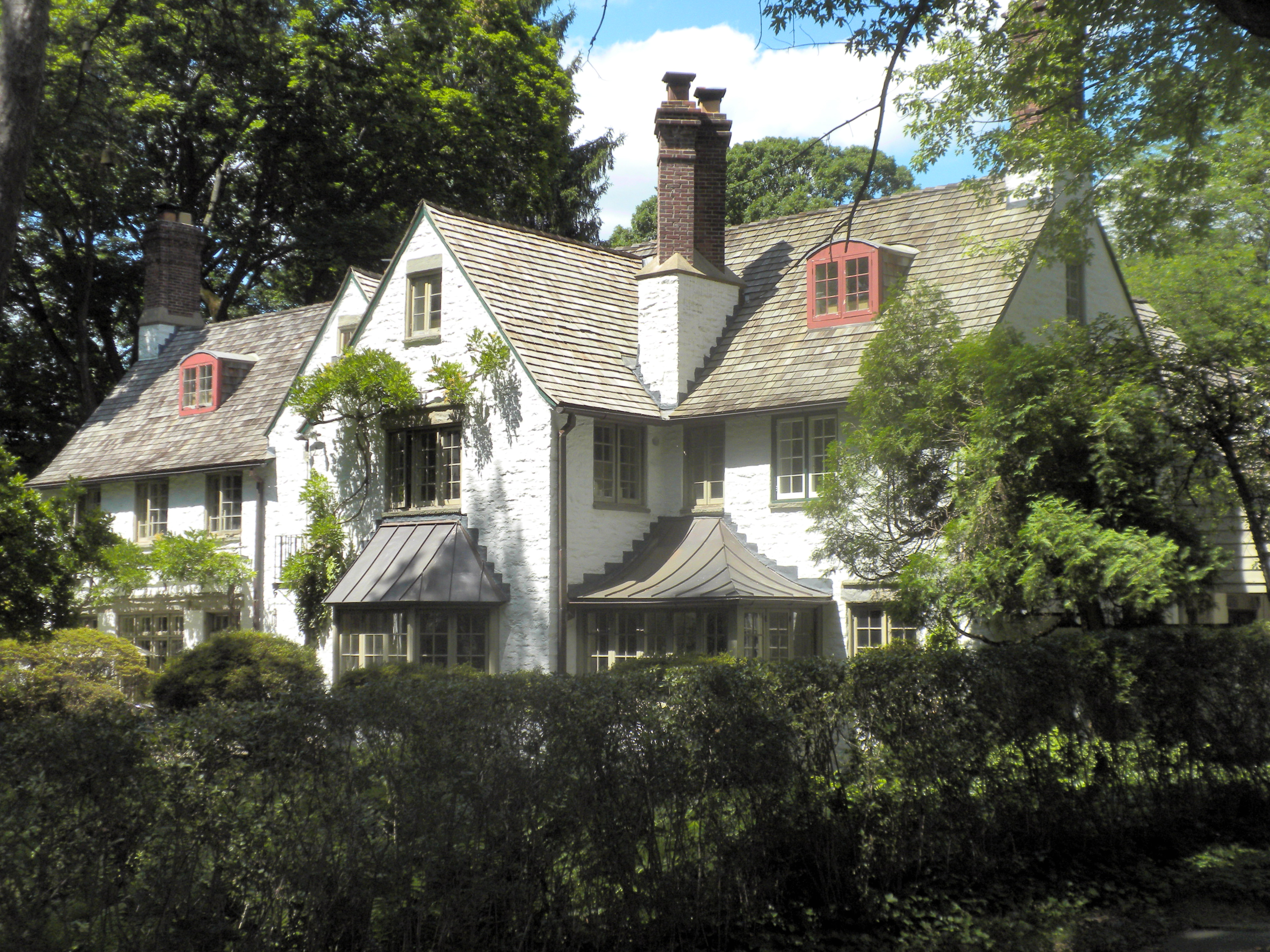
Violet Oakley Studio on St. George's Road in Chestnut Hill

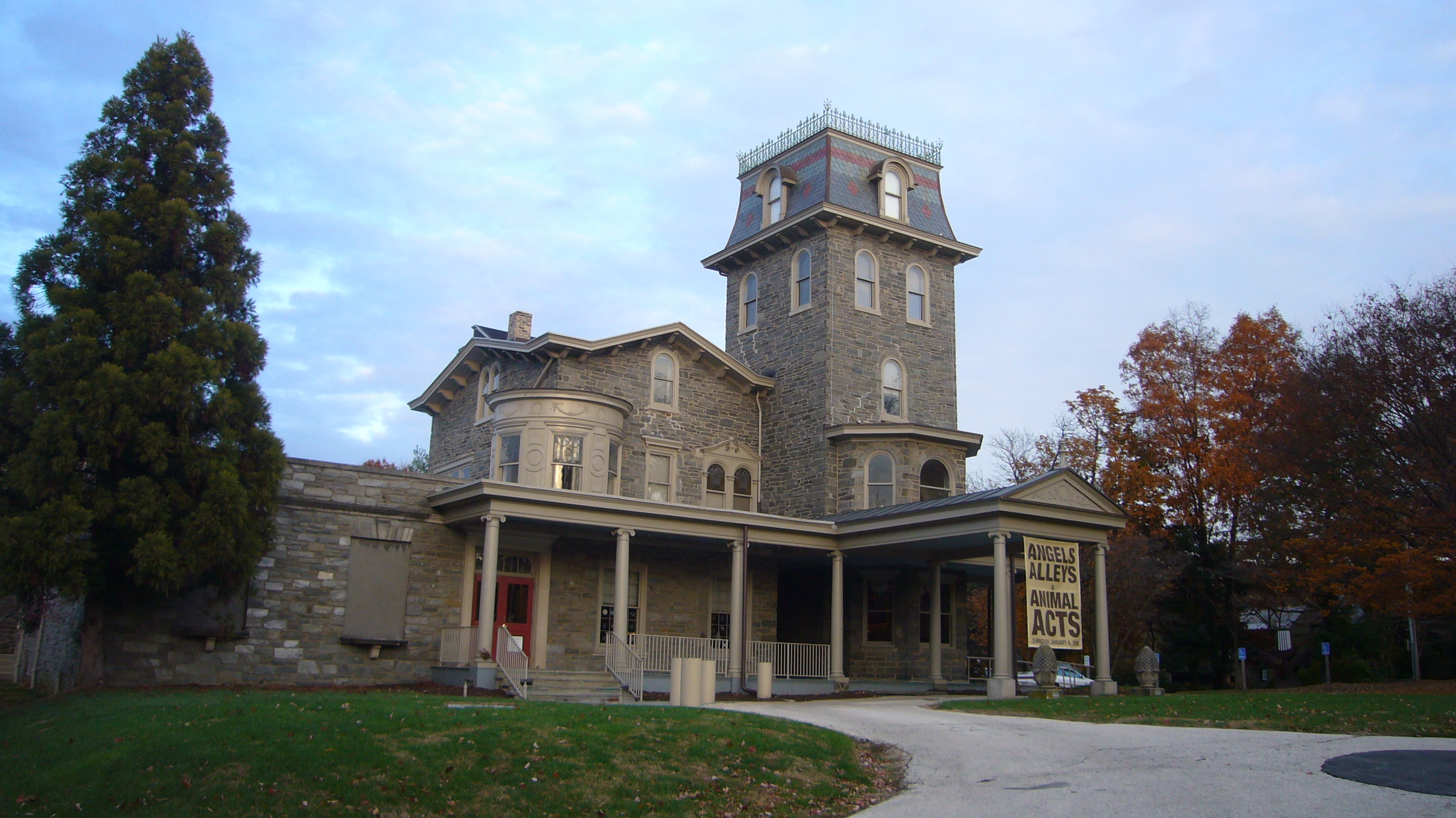
Woodmere Art Museumin Chestnut Hill, Pennsylvania

In 1916, while still studying at the Pennsylvania Academy of the Fine Arts in Philadelphia, Emerson was awarded the commission of designing the mural decorations for the Plays and Players Theatre, then known as The Little Theatre, at 17th and Delancey Streets in Center City, Philadelphia. She chose as her subjects a Greek myth, in which King Minos' daughter Ariadne, after being deserted by Theseus, is discovered by the god of wine, Dionysus.

In the murals, Emerson combined aspects of Greek and Minoan painting with eastern styles including China and Japan. Tempera studies for the work were shown in the sixteenth annual exhibition of water colors at The Pennsylvania Academy of the Fine Arts in 1918. Emerson was awarded the Fellowship Prize by the Academy in 1918 for her mural decorations. When they were unveiled at The Little Theatre, Violet Oakley praised both the quality of the murals and the artist.

A prolific painter, Emerson exhibited at the Pennsylvania Academy of the Fine Arts from 1918 to 1927 and later from 1932 to 1945. She contributed articles to The American Magazine of Art. She also taught in the Philadelphia area at the Agnes Irwin School, The Museum School of Industrial Arts, and at Chestnut Hill College.

Emerson became Oakley's devoted assistant and partner, living and working out of Oakley's famed studio, Cogslea, in the Mount Airy section of Philadelphia, on a number of projects, including Oakley's Harrisburg murals project. They traveled abroad and exhibited together, and their partnership endured for over forty years.

Emerson served as curator and director of Woodmere Art Gallery (now Art Museum) from 1940 to 1978. At that time, it was unusual for a woman to hold such a position, but Emerson viewed female artists as equal to their male contemporaries.

== Legacy ==
Emerson has been described as a competent administrator of Woodmere Art Museum partly because of her thorough record keeping. She actively researched items in the permanent collection and organized the paperwork associated with each piece of art; she also solicited information from visiting artists. Emerson donated generously to Woodmere Art Museum, including donating numerous works of art. She also endowed prizes for Woodmere's shows.

Following Violet Oakley's death in 1961, Emerson created the Violet Oakley Memorial Foundation to keep her teacher and companion's memory and ideals alive. The foundation also sought to house and preserve the contents of Oakley's studio, which was placed on the National Register of Historic Places in 1977 as the Violet Oakley Studio. Emerson served as the foundation's president, as well as curator and general caretaker of the studio. The studio was opened to the public as a kind of museum, and Emerson organized various activities there, including concerts, exhibitions, poetry readings, and lectures on American art and illustration. Following Emerson's death, the foundation dispersed the contents, sold the house, and disbanded.

In 1979, Emerson was instrumental in mounting an Oakley revival as an exhibition at the Philadelphia Museum of Art.
