= Violet Oakley =

American artist (1874–1961)

Violet Oakley Artist
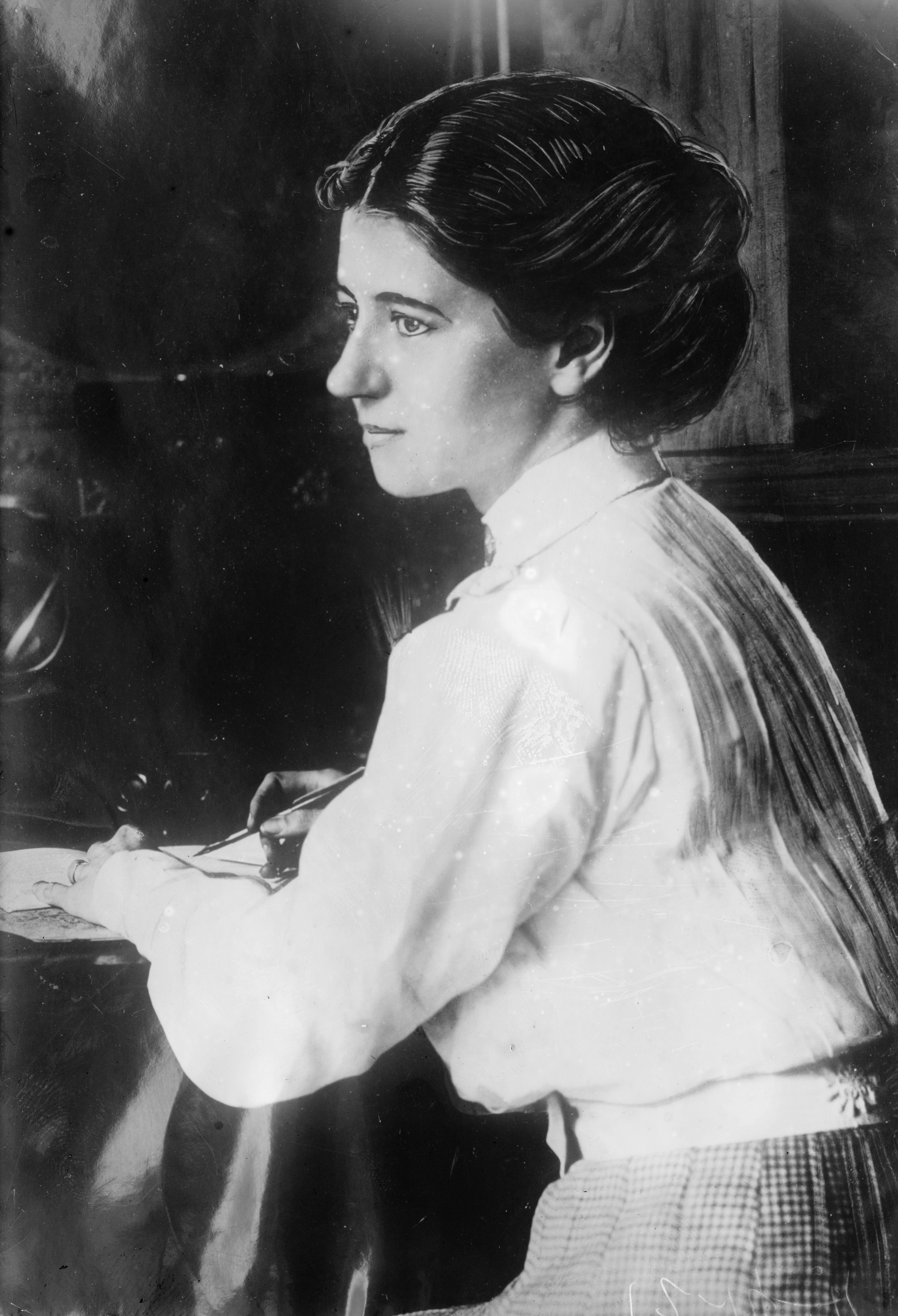
- Violet Oakley, date unknown
- Born: June 10, 1874; Bergen Heights, New Jersey, U.S. (present-day Jersey City, New Jersey)
- Died: February 25, 1961 (aged 86); Philadelphia, Pennsylvania, U.S.
- Resting place: Green-Wood Cemetery (Brooklyn, New York City)
- Known for: Painting, murals, stained glass, and animals
- Notable work: Pennsylvania State Capitol murals
- Movement: Pre-Raphaelite influence
- Partner: Edith Emerson

Violet Oakley (June 10, 1874 – February 25, 1961) was an American artist. She was the first American woman to receive a public mural commission. During the first quarter of the 20th century, she was renowned as a pathbreaker in mural decoration, a field that had been exclusively practiced by men. Oakley excelled at murals and stained glass designs that addressed themes from history and literature in Renaissance-revival styles.

== Early life and education ==
Oakley was born in Bergen Heights, a section of Jersey City, New Jersey, into a family of artists. Her parents were art devotee Arthur Edmund Oakley and drawing teacher and portrait painter Cornelia Swain. Both of her grandfathers were members of the National Academy of Design. In 1892, she studied at the Art Students League of New York with James Carroll Beckwith and Irving R. Wiles. A year later, she studied in England and France, under Raphaël Collin and others.

After her return to the United States in 1896, she studied briefly at the Pennsylvania Academy of the Fine Arts in Philadelphia, and then joined Howard Pyle's famous illustration class at Drexel Institute.

== Career ==
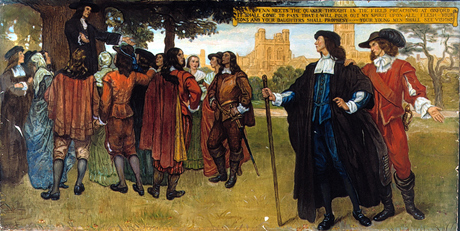
Penn meets the Quaker, a public mural by Oakley in the Pennsylvania State Capitol in Harrisburg, Pennsylvania

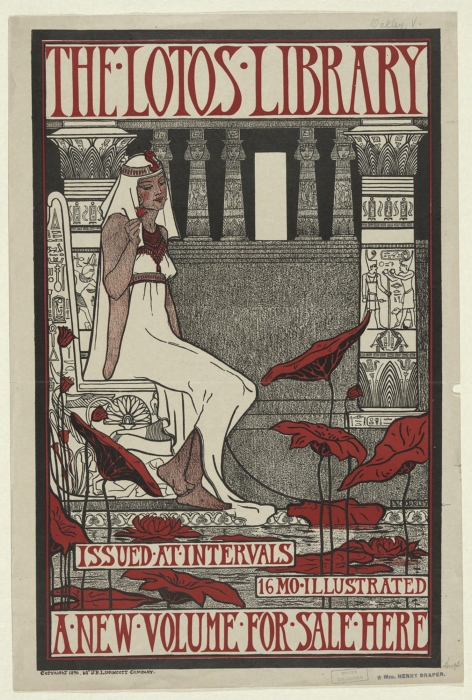
An 1896 lithograph by Oakley for The Lotos Library

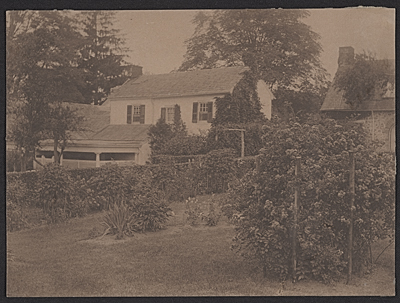
Red Rose Inn

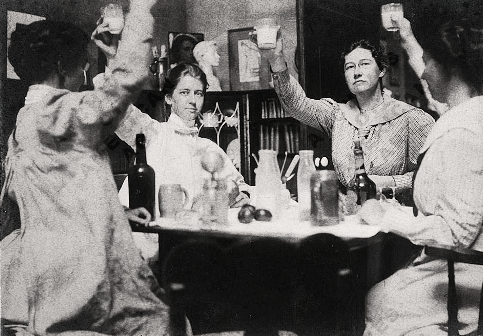
Photograph of Violet Oakley and Jessie Willcox Smith facing the camera and Elizabeth Shippen Green and Henrietta Cozens, who are partially hidden, c. 1901, Violet Oakley papers, Archives of American Art, Smithsonian Institution.

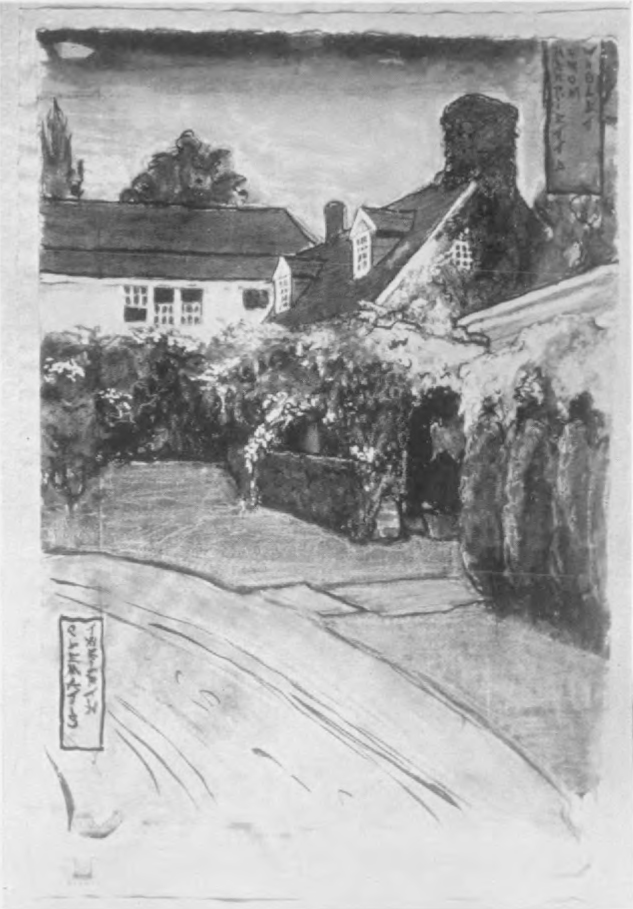
The Red Rose by Violet Oakley

She had early success as a popular illustrator for The Century Magazine, Collier's Weekly, St. Nicholas Magazine, and Woman's Home Companion. The style of her illustrations and stained glass reflects her emulation of the English Pre-Raphaelites. Oakley's commitment to Victorian aesthetics during the advent of Modernism led to the decline of her reputation by the middle of the twentieth century.

Oakley's political beliefs were shaped by the Quaker William Penn (1644–1718), founder of the colonial-era Province of Pennsylvania, whose ideals she represented in her murals at the Pennsylvania State Capitol in Harrisburg, Pennsylvania.

She developed a commitment to Quaker principles of pacifism, equality of the races and sexes, economic and social justice, and international government. When the United States refused to join the League of Nations after World War I, Oakley went to Geneva, Switzerland, where she spent three years drawing portraits of the League's delegates which she published in her portfolio, "Law Triumphant" (Philadelphia, 1932). She was an early advocate of nuclear disarmament after World War II.

Oakley was raised in the Episcopal church but in 1903 became a devoted student of Christian Science after a significant healing of asthma while she was doing preparatory study for the first set of Harrisburg murals in Florence, Italy. She was a member of Second Church of Christ, Scientist, Philadelphia from 1912, when it was organized, until her death in 1961.

She received many honors through her life including an honorary Doctorate of Laws Degree in 1948 from Drexel Institute. At the 1904 Saint Louis International Exposition, Oakley won the gold medal in illustration for her watercolors for "The Story of Vashti," and the silver medal in mural decoration for her murals at All Angels' Church.

In 1905, she became the first woman to receive the Gold Medal of Honor from the Pennsylvania Academy of Fine Arts. In 1915, Oakley was awarded the Medal of Honor in the painting category at the 1915 Panama–Pacific International Exposition in San Francisco for her 1912 portrait of Philadelphia poet Florence Van Leer Earle Coates as "The Tragic Muse".

Around 1897, Oakley and her sister Hester rented a studio space at 1523 Chestnut Street, Philadelphia in the Love Building. The sisters decorated the space with furniture loaned by their mother and a combination of antiques, fabric, and copies of Old Master paintings. Oakley and her friends, the artists Elizabeth Shippen Green and Jessie Willcox Smith, all former students of Pyle, were named the Red Rose Girls by him.

The three illustrators received the "Red Rose Girls" nickname while they lived together in the Red Rose Inn in Villanova, Pennsylvania from 1899 to 1901. They later lived, along with Henrietta Cozens, in a home in the Mt. Airy neighborhood of Philadelphia that they named Cogslea after their four surnames (Cozens, Oakley, Green and Smith). In 1996, Oakley was elected to the Society of Illustrators Hall of Fame, the last of the 'Red Rose Girls' to be inducted and the fifth women inducted since its founding in 1958. Cogslea was added to the National Register of Historic Places in 1977 as the Violet Oakley Studio.

Her home and studio at Yonkers, New York, where she resided intermittently between 1912 and 1915 is also listed on the National Register of Historic Places as the Plashbourne Estate.

Oakley was a member of The Plastic Club, a Philadelphia organization established to promote "Art for art's sake". Other members included Pearl Van Sciver, Elenore Abbott, Jessie Willcox Smith, and Elizabeth Shippen Green. Many of the women who founded the organization had been students of Howard Pyle. It was founded to provide a means to encourage one another professionally and create opportunities to sell their works of art.

In 1916, Oakley’s life partner, Edith Emerson, moved into Oakley's Mount Airy home, Cogslea. Emerson was also a painter and, at one time, a student of Oakley's. Emerson and Oakley's relationship endured until Oakley's death and Emerson subsequently established a foundation to memorialize Oakley's life and legacy. The foundation dissolved in 1988 and its records were donated to the Smithsonian Archives of American Art.

On June 14, 2014, Oakley was featured in the first gay-themed tour of Green-Wood Cemetery in Brooklyn, New York City, where she is interred in the Oakley family plot, Section 63, Lot 14788.

== New Woman ==
As educational opportunities were made more available in the 19th century, women artists became part of professional enterprises, including founding their own art associations. Artwork made by women was considered to be inferior, and to help overcome that stereotype women became "increasingly vocal and confident" in promoting women's work, and thus became part of the emerging image of the educated, modern and freer "New Woman".

Artists "played crucial roles in representing the New Woman, both by drawing images of the icon and exemplifying this emerging type through their own lives." In the late 19th century and early 20th century about 88% of the subscribers of 11,000 magazines and periodicals were women. As women entered the artist community, publishers hired women to create illustrations that depict the world through a woman's perspective. Other successful illustrators were Jennie Augusta Brownscombe, Jessie Willcox Smith, Rose O'Neill, and Elizabeth Shippen Green.

== Work ==
- Violet Oakley Studio
- U.S. National Register of Historic Places
- Pennsylvania state historical marker
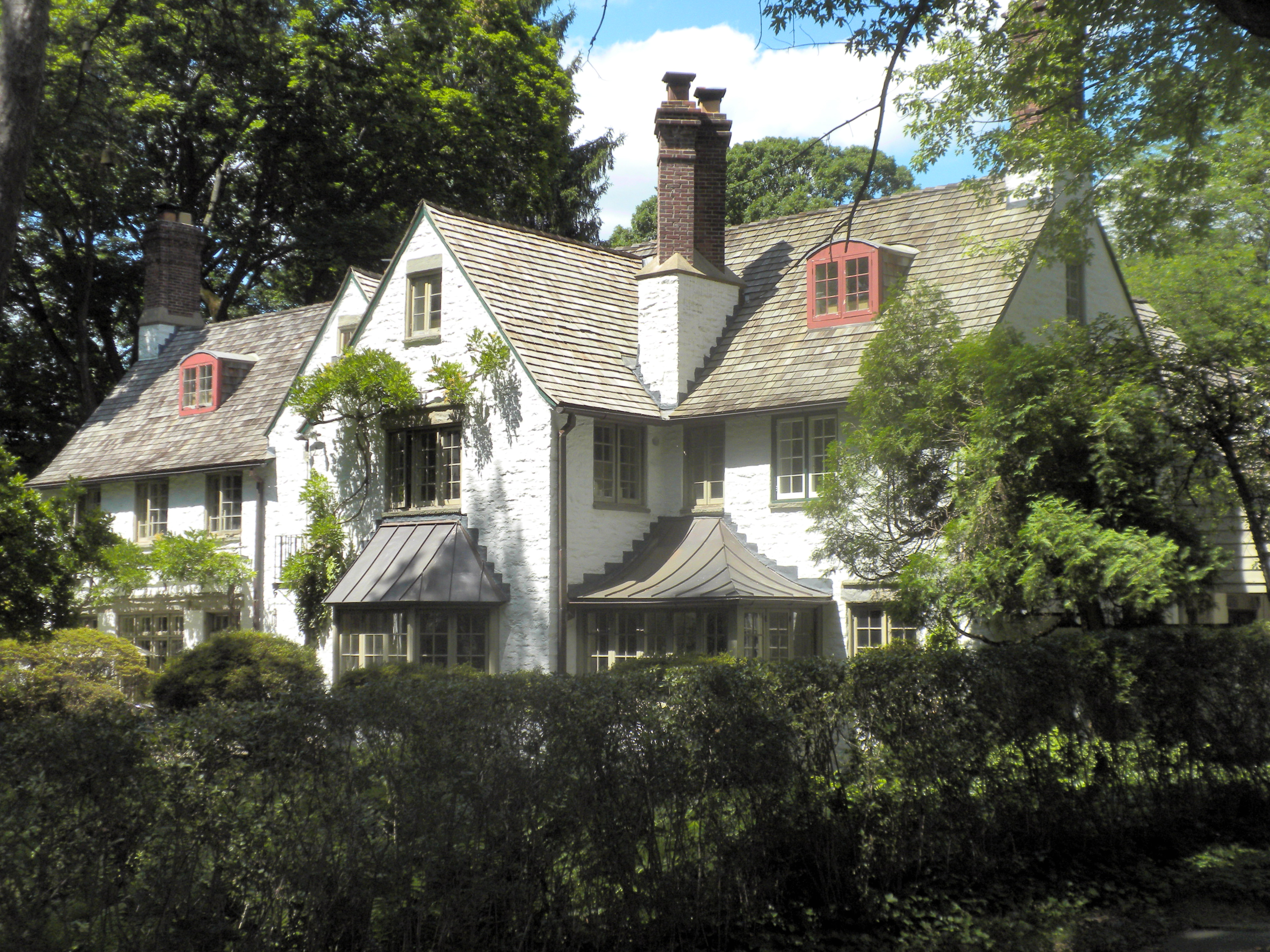

- Location within Pennsylvania
- Location: 627 St. George's Rd. Philadelphia, Pennsylvania
- Coordinates: 40°3′8″N 75°12′20″W
- Built: 1902–05
- Architect: Day & Klauder
- NRHP reference No.: 77001188

Significant dates
- Added to NRHP: September 13, 1977
- Designated PHMC: October 20, 1998

Her teacher Howard Pyle recommended Oakley and fellow artist Jessie Willcox Smith for their first important commission, a series of illustrations for Longfellow's Evangeline, that was published in 1897, numerous commissions followed.

Oakley painted a series of 43 murals in the Pennsylvania State Capitol Building in Harrisburg for the Governors Grand Reception Room, the Senate and the Supreme Court. Oakley was originally commissioned in 1902 only for the murals in the Governor's Grand Reception Room, which she titled "The Founding of the State of Liberty Spiritual." In the reception room murals, Oakley depicts the story of William Penn and the founding of Pennsylvania. She conducted extensive research on the subject, even traveling to England. The series of murals were unveiled in the new Capitol Building in November 1906, shortly after the dedication of the building. When Edwin Austin Abbey died in 1911, Violet Oakley was offered the job of creating the murals for the Senate and Supreme Court Chambers, a 16-year project.

Oakley's other work includes:

- Two murals and stained glass work for All Angels Church, New York City, her first commission, 1900
- Murals for the Cuyahoga County Courthouse, Cleveland, Ohio, her only major mural commission outside Pennsylvania
- The Great Wonder: A Vision of the Apocalypse (1924) triptych for the living room of the Alumnae House at Vassar College
- Eighteen mural panels on The Building of the House of Wisdom and stained glass dome for the Charlton Yarnell House, 1910, at 17th and Locust Street in Philadelphia (three lunettes, The Child and Tradition, Youth and the Arts, and Man and Science were removed and in collection of Woodmere Art Museum).
- Great Women of the Bible murals, First Presbyterian Church in Germantown, 1945–1949
- Three murals, David and Goliath, Christ Among the Doctors, and The Young Solomon appear in the library at Springside Chestnut Hill Academy
- The Holy Experiment: A message to the World from Pennsylvania, published by the author in a limited edition of 1000, an Elephant Folio with 26 lithographic plates of the artist's mural work at the Senate Chambers, with text by the artist/author.
- Life of Moses, commissioned by Samuel S. Fleisher in 1927, remains today as the altar piece for the Sanctuary of the Fleisher Art Memorial on Catharine Street in Philadelphia. It is dedicated to Fleisher's mother, Cecilia [sic] Hofheimer Fleisher and inscribed from Exodus 2: 'And the child grew and he became her song...' Oakley created the work while on sojourn in Italy, staying at a villa outside Florence.
- The Divine Comedy window commissioned in 1910 by Robert J. Collier for his townhouse in Manhattan; c. 1918 gifted to the Apostolic Nunciature in Washington, D.C. The window is divided into three sections, one for each cantiche in Dante's poem, with four medallions each. The Inferno section is read from top to bottom, reflecting Dante's descent through Hell. The Purgatorio and Paradiso sections are read from bottom to top, reflecting Dante's journey from Hell to Paradise.

== Exhibitions ==
- Lehigh University Professor Francis Quirk organized an exhibit of her work that opened with a reception for 500 people in 1950.
- Violet Oakley's first major retrospective was organized by the Philadelphia Museum of Art in 1979.
- The Woodmere Art Museum staged a major exhibit of Oakley's work from September 2017 to January 2018. In January 2020 the museum launched The Violet Oakley Experience, a digital resource that organizes and presents over 3,000 works of art by Violet Oakley in Woodmere's collection.

== Gallery ==
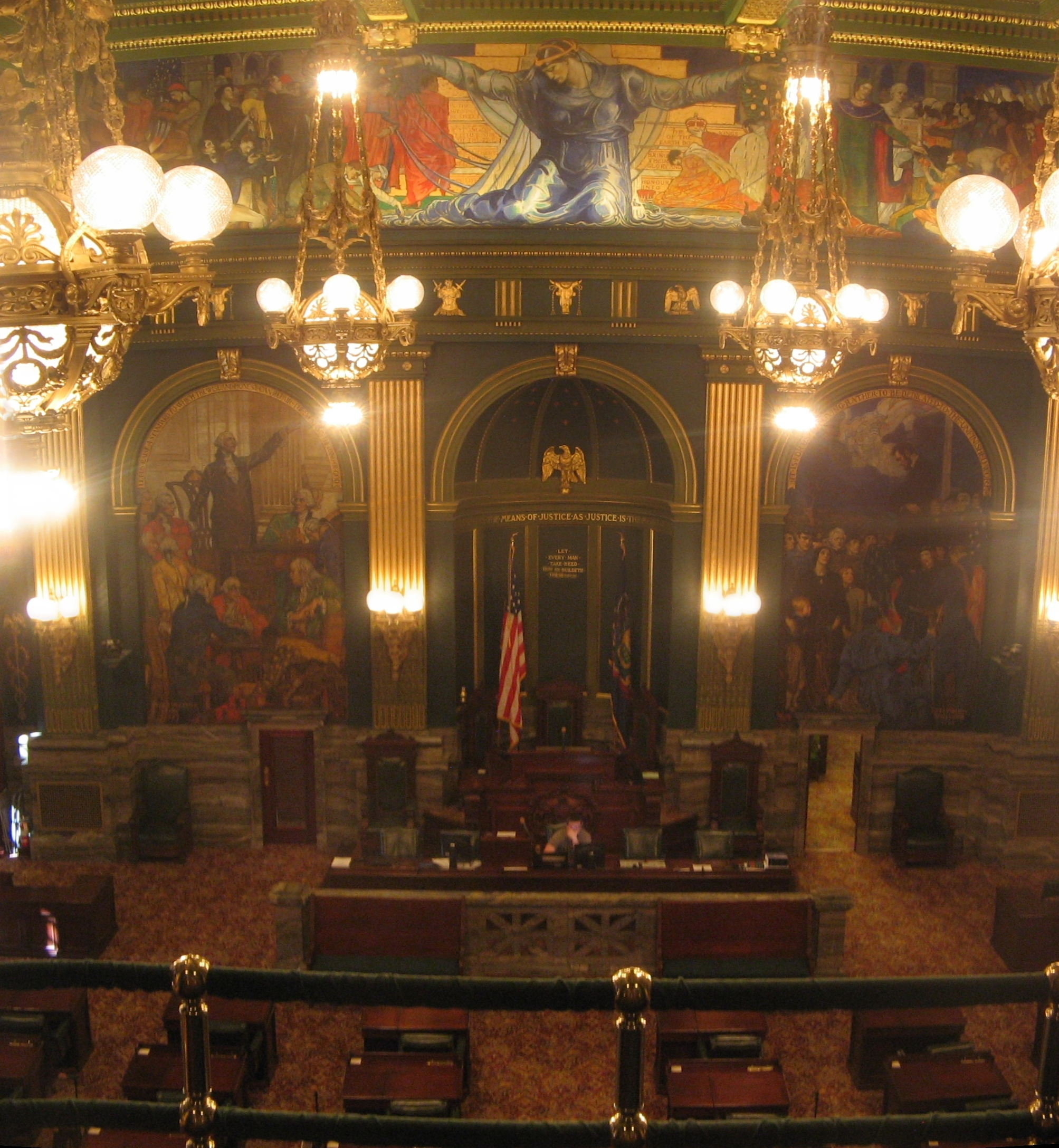
Senate mural, Pennsylvania State Capitol

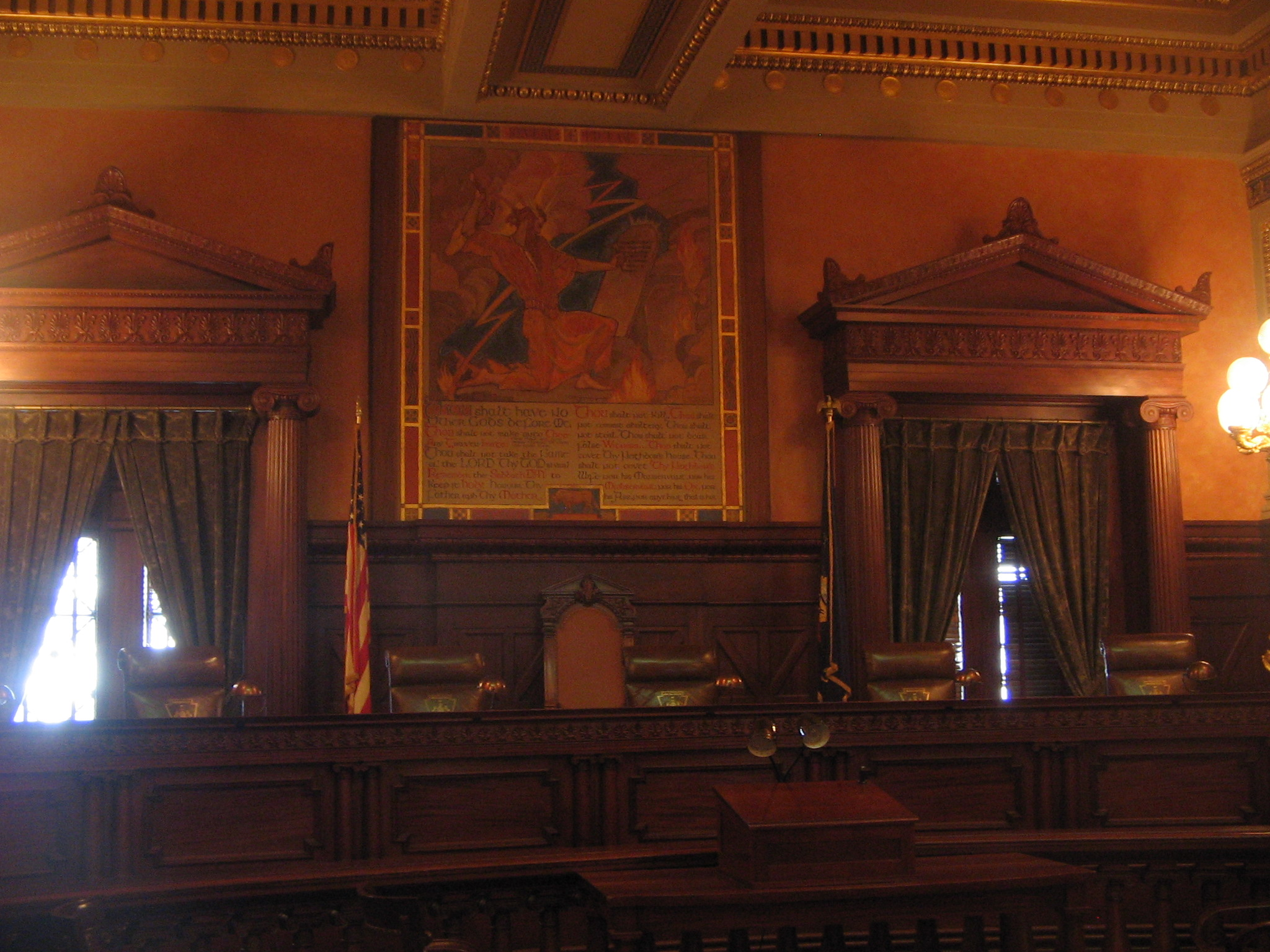
Supreme Court mural, Pennsylvania State Capitol

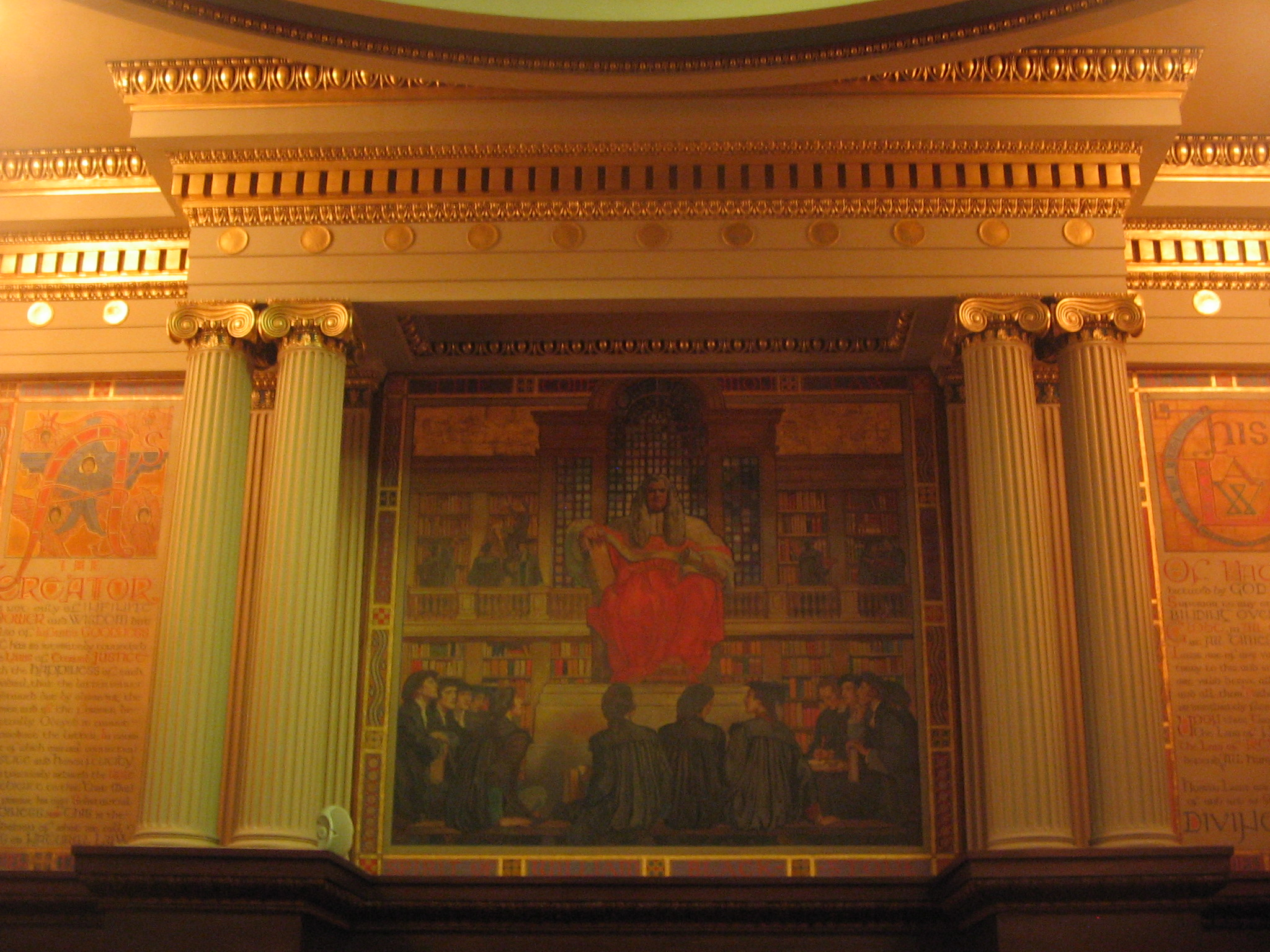
Supreme Court mural, Pennsylvania State Capitol

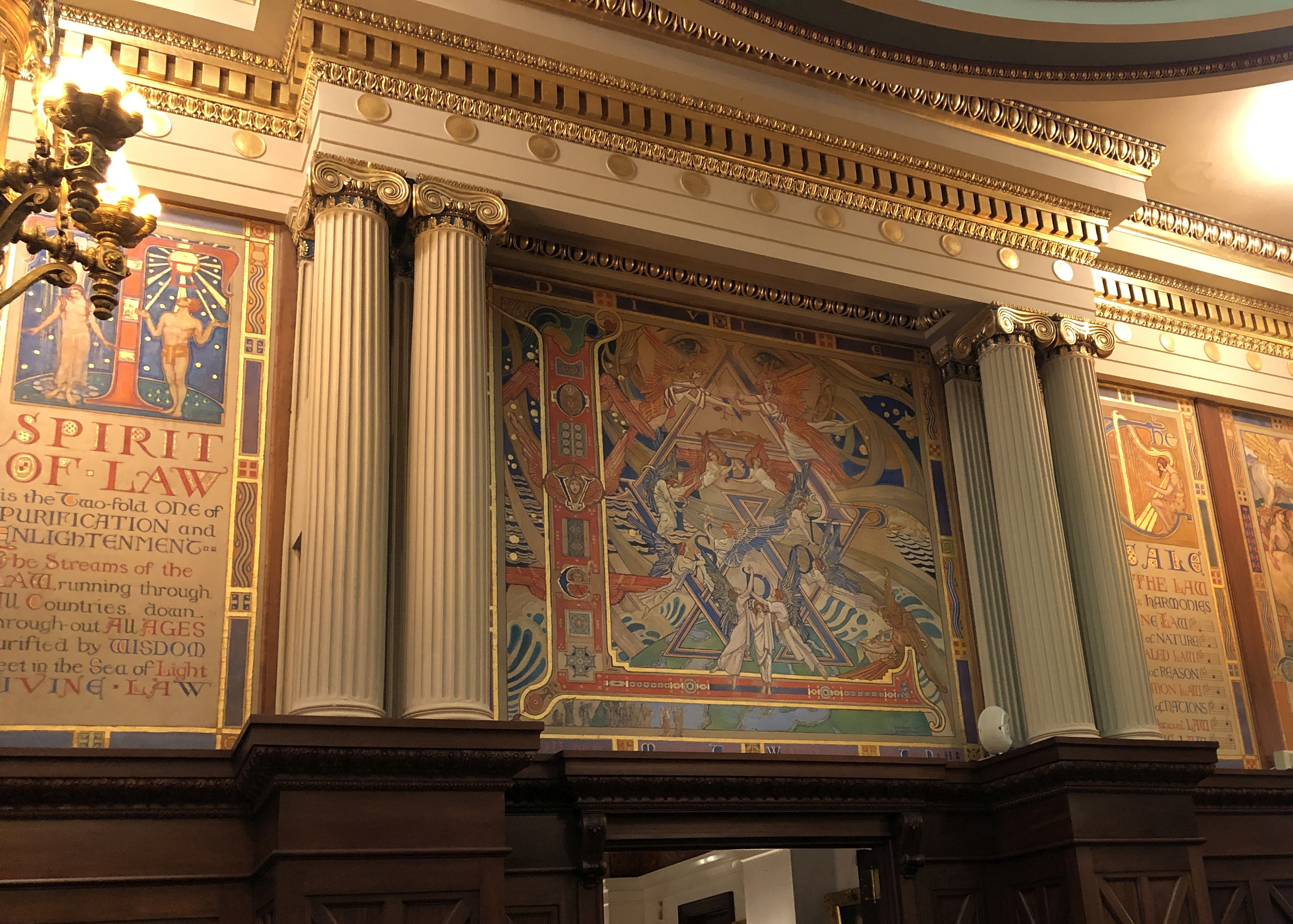
Divine Law mural in the Pennsylvania Supreme Court's chamber

== Sources ==
- Patricia Likos Ricci (2017) A Grand Vision: Violet Oakley and the American Renaissance, exhibition catalog, Woodmere Art Museum, September 30, 2017 – January 21, 2018.
- Patricia Likos Ricci: "Violet Oakley, American Renaissance Woman", The Pennsylvania Magazine of History and Biography, Vol. cxxvi, No.2 (April 2002).
- Rowland Elzea and Elizabeth H. Hawkes (1980). A Small School of Art: The Students of Howard Pyle, Wilmington: Delaware Art Museum
- Violet Oakley (1950). The Holy Experiment, Our Heritage from William Penn: Series of Mural Paintings in the Governor's Reception Room, in the Senate Chamber and in the Supreme Courtroom of the State Capitol at Harrisburg, Pennsylvania. Philadelphia: Cogslea Studio Publications (limited edition, one thousand copies, hand-numbered by the author)
- Carter, Alice A. (2000). The Red Rose Girls: An Uncommon Story of Art and Love. New York: H. N. Abrams. ISBN 978-0-8109-4437-4.
- Sheets, Georg R (2002). A Sacred Challenge; Violet Oakley and the Pennsylvania Capital Murals. Harrisburg: Capitol Preservation Committee. ISBN 0-9643048-6-4.
- Van Hook, Bailey (2016). Violet Oakley: An Artist's Life. Newark DE: University of Delaware Press. ISBN 978-1611495850.
