= Elizabeth Shippen Green =

American illustrator (1871–1954)

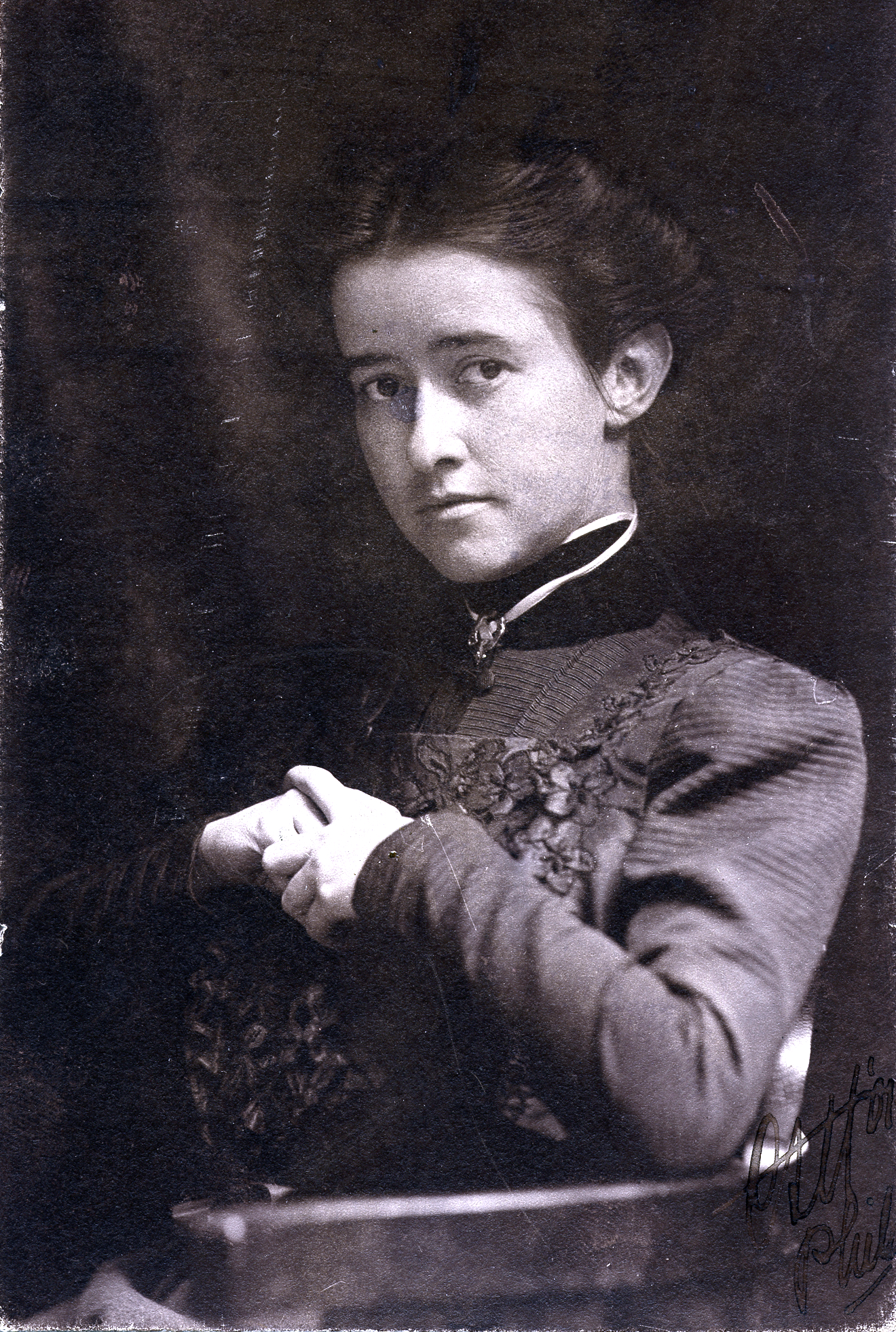
- Elizabeth Shippen Green
- Born: September 1, 1871; Philadelphia, Pennsylvania, US
- Died: May 29, 1954; Philadelphia, Pennsylvania
- Known for: Illustration
- Awards: Mary Smith Prize, Pennsylvania Academy of the Fine Arts; 1905

Elizabeth Shippen Green (September 1, 1871 – May 29, 1954) was an American illustrator. She illustrated children's books and worked for publications such as The Ladies' Home Journal, The Saturday Evening Post and Harper's Magazine.

== Education ==
Green enrolled at the Pennsylvania Academy of the Fine Arts in 1887 and studied with the painters Thomas Pollock Anshutz, Thomas Eakins, and Robert Vonnoh. She then began study with Howard Pyle at Drexel Institute where she met Violet Oakley and Jessie Willcox Smith.

== New Woman ==
As educational opportunities were made more available in the 19th century, women artists became part of professional enterprises, including founding their own art associations. Artwork made by women was considered to be inferior, and to help overcome that stereotype women became “increasingly vocal and confident” in promoting women's work, and thus became part of the emerging image of the educated, modern and freer “New Woman”. Artists "played crucial roles in representing the New Woman, both by drawing images of the icon and exemplifying this emerging type through their own lives.” In the late 19th century and early 20th century about 88% of the subscribers of 11,000 magazines and periodicals were women. As women entered the artist community, publishers hired women to create illustrations that depict the world through a woman's perspective. Other successful illustrators were Jennie Augusta Brownscombe, Jessie Willcox Smith, Rose O'Neill, and Violet Oakley.

Green was a member of Philadelphia's The Plastic Club, an organization established to promote "art for art's sake". Other members included Elenore Abbott, Jessie Willcox Smith, and Violet Oakley. Many of the women who founded the organization had been students of Howard Pyle. It was founded to provide a means to encourage one another professionally and create opportunities to sell their works of art.

== Illustrator ==
She was publishing before she was eighteen and began making pen and ink drawings and illustrations for St. Nicholas Magazine, Woman's Home Companion, and The Saturday Evening Post. In 1901 she signed an exclusive contract with the monthly Harper's Magazine. Green was also a book illustrator.

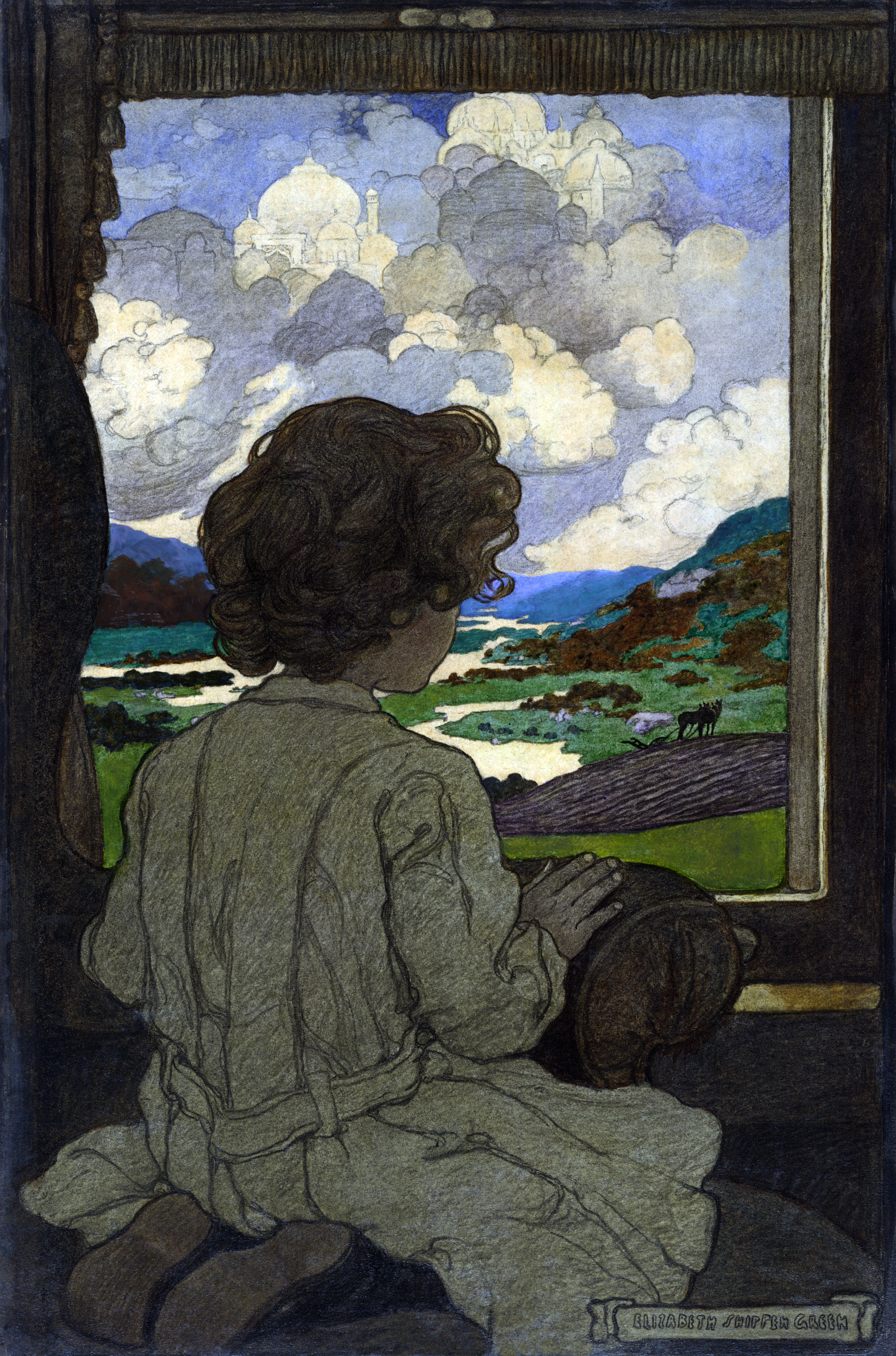
"The Journey", for a series of poems by Josephine Preston Peabody, 1903

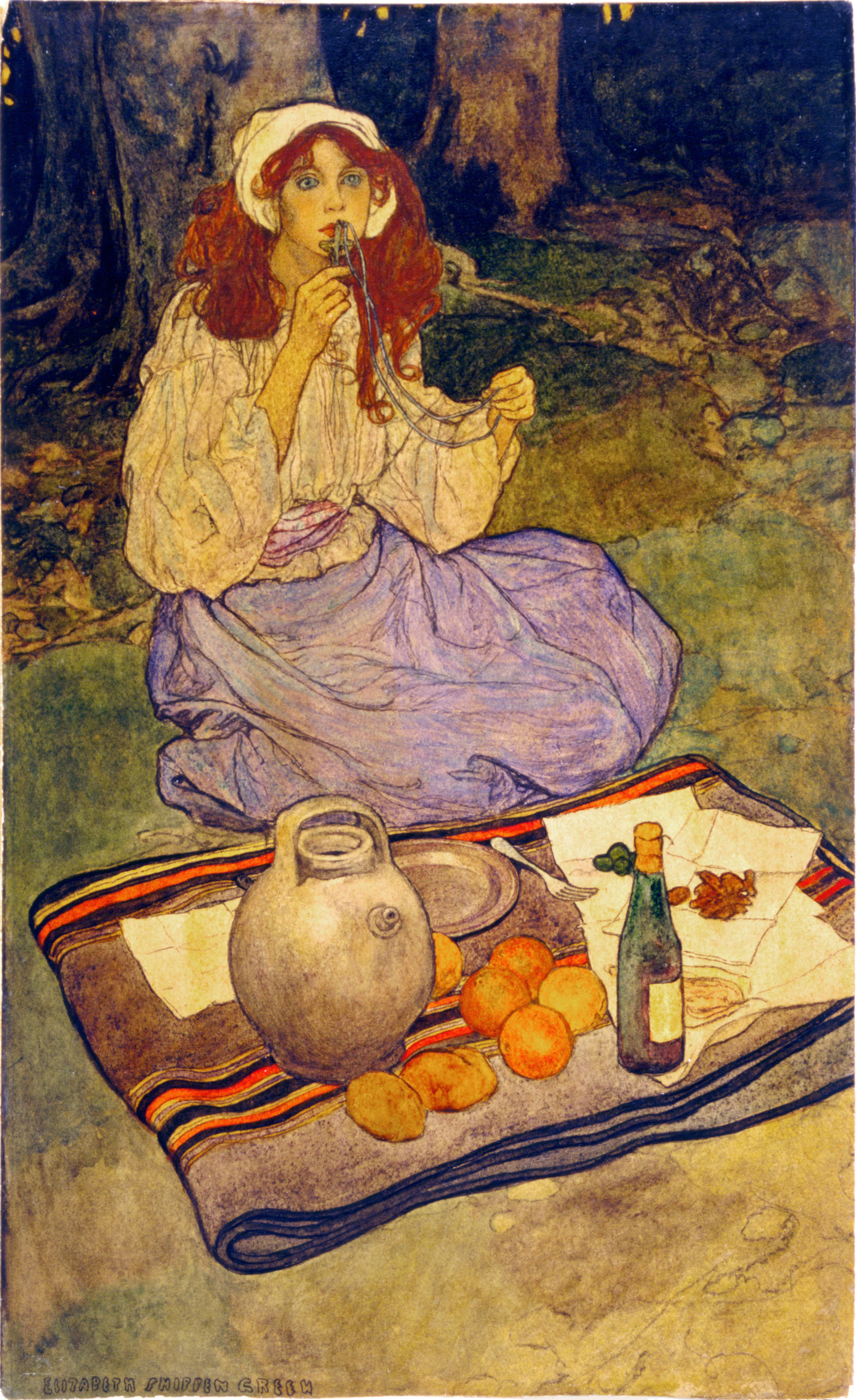
"Miguela, kneeling still, put it to her lip", Harper's Magazine, 1906

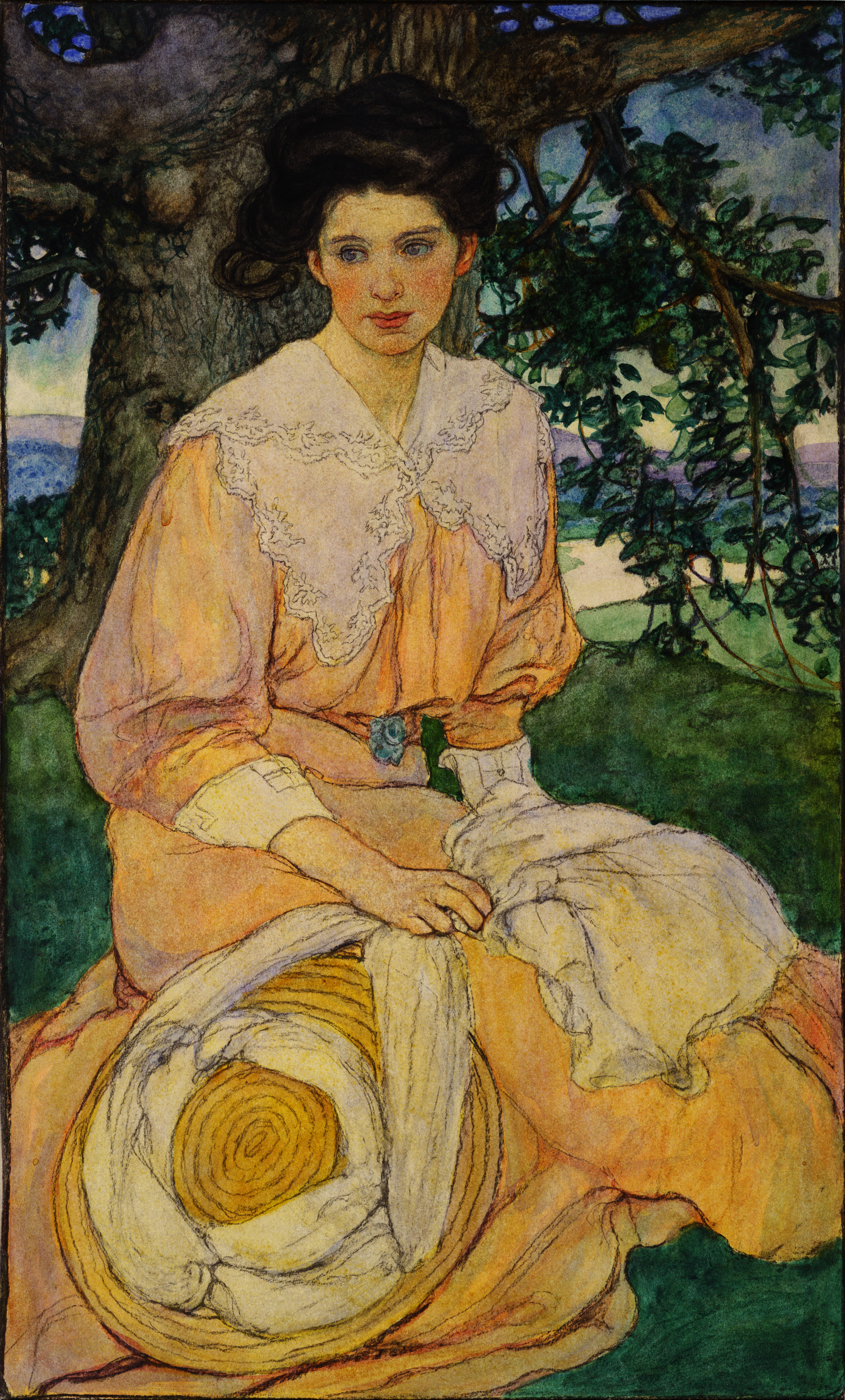
"Giséle", Harper's Magazine, 1908

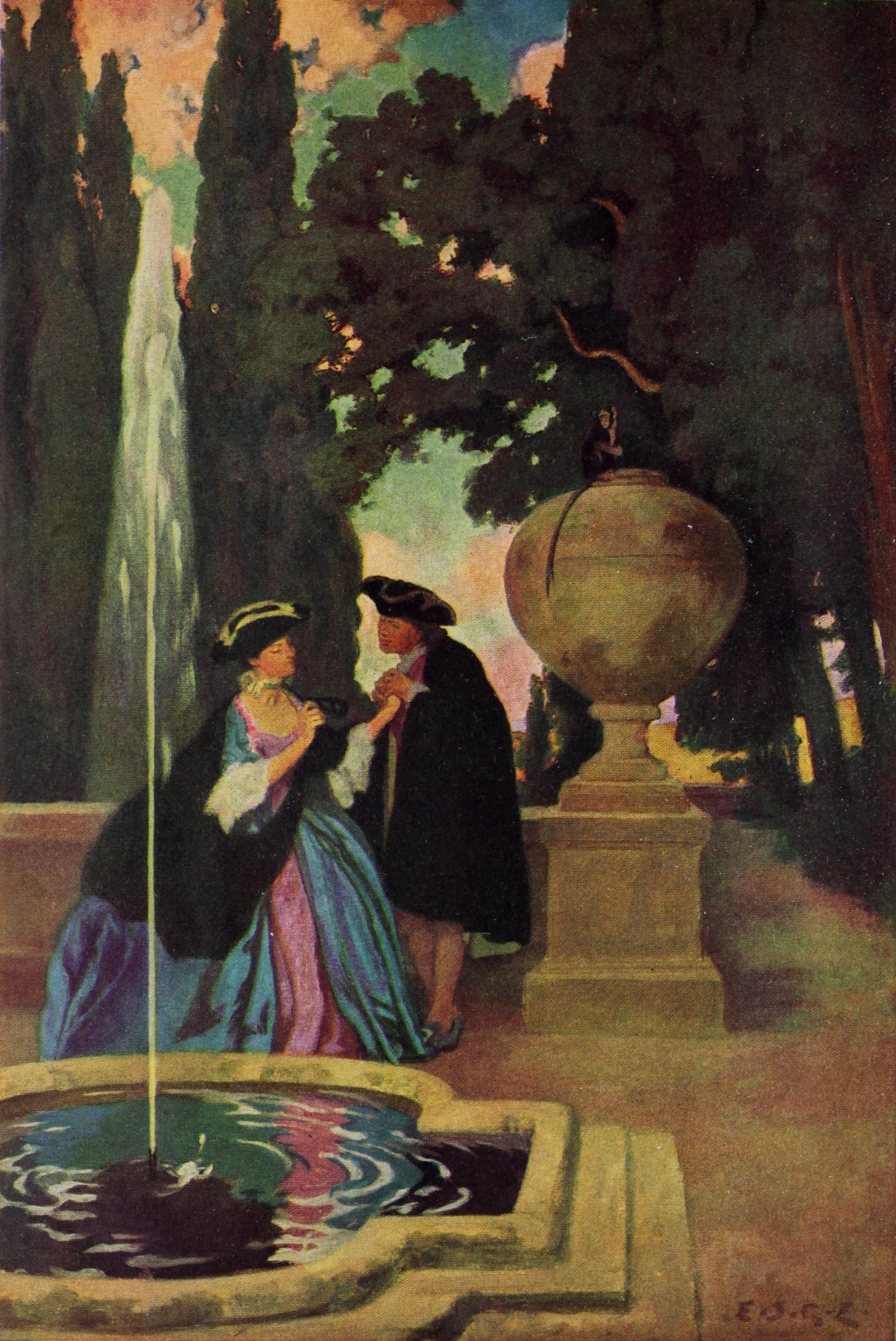
Harper's Magazine, 1922

In 1903, she and Florence Scovel Shinn became the first women to be elected Associate Members of the Society of Illustrators even though women were not allowed to be full members of the organization at that time. In 1905, Green won the Mary Smith Prize at the annual Pennsylvania Academy of the Fine Arts exhibition. In 1994, she was elected posthumously to the Society of Illustrators Hall of Fame.

== Personal life ==
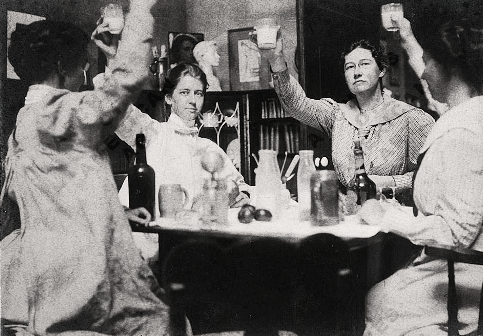
Photograph of Violet Oakley and Jessie Willcox Smith facing the camera and Elizabeth Shippen Green and Henrietta Cozens, who are partially hidden, c. 1901, Violet Oakley papers, Archives of American Art, Smithsonian Institution.

Green became close and lifelong friends with Oakley and Smith. They lived together first at the Red Rose Inn in Villanova north of Philadelphia (they were called "the Red Rose Girls" by Pyle), and later at Cogslea, their home in the Mount Airy neighborhood of Philadelphia.

In 1911, at the age of forty, Green married Huger Elliott, an architecture professor, after a five-year engagement, and moved away from Cogslea. Green continued to work through the 1920s and illustrated a nonsense verse alphabet with her husband, An Alliterative Alphabet Aimed at Adult Abecedarians (1947). Green died May 29, 1954.
