= Nora Archibald Smith =

American writer (1859–1934)

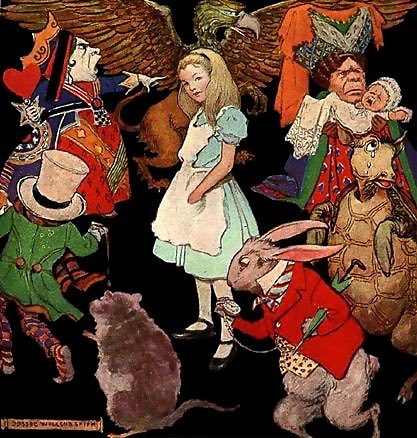
From the cover of Nora Archibald Smith's book Boys and Girls of Bookland (1923), illustrated by Jessie Willcox Smith

Nora Archibald Smith (1859–1934) was an American writer of children's literature in the late 19th and early 20th centuries, and sister of Kate Douglas Wiggin. Smith and Wiggin co-authored and co-edited a series of children's books.

Both sisters were active in the kindergarten movement that was developing at the turn of the twentieth century, and wrote repeatedly on the subject. They were admirers of Friedrich Fröbel and promoted his theories on early childhood education.

== Biography ==
=== Early life ===
Nora Archibald Smith was the sister of Kate Douglas Wiggin, known best for her novel Rebecca of Sunnybrook Farm. Both girls were born in Philadelphia to Robert Noah Smith and Helen Elizabeth (Dyer) Smith. Their father died shortly after Nora's birth and their mother then moved the family to Portland, Maine. She soon remarried and the family moved into Nora and Kate's stepfather's (Dr. Albion Bradbury) house in Hollis, Maine. It was in the farmhouse called “Quillcote” that both Nora and Kate grew up and to which they would later retire.

=== California ===
In 1873, while Kate attended finishing school in Andover, Massachusetts, Dr. Bradbury moved the family to California. Kate opened the first free kindergarten west of the Rocky Mountains on Silver Street in San Francisco, California while Nora was teaching in the public schools of Tucson, Arizona. In 1877 Nora was awarded an A.B. from Santa Barbara College. In 1880 Nora and Kate founded the California Kindergarten Training School together and Nora received a certificate from the school in 1881.

Nora then went on to become the superintendent of the free kindergarten on Silver Street and later to take over the running of the California Kindergarten Training School in 1889. Ms. Smith was president of the California Froebel Society, an executive member of the committee of the International Kindergarten Association, and the vice-president (1891-1892) of the kindergarten department of the National Education Association (Houghton, Mifflin and Company, 1899). Nora Archibald Smith collaborated with her sister to write or edit fifteen books. Nora, a writer in her own right, also published many serial stories and academic journal articles on early childhood education. Two of Nora's poems ("Doll's Calendar" and "Feast of the Doll") were set to music by composer Grace Chadbourne.

== Selected works ==
=== As sole writer ===
- The Children of the Future (1898)
- The Kindergarten in a Nutshell: a handbook for the home (1899)
- Under the Cactus Flag: a story of life in Mexico (1899)
- The Message of Froebel and Other Essays (1900)
- Three Little Marys (1902)
- Nelson the Adventurer: a story for boys (1906)
- The Adventures of a Doll (1907), illus. Dan Sayre Groesbeck
- The Home-Made Kindergarten (1912)
- Old, Old Tales from the Old, Old Book (1916) – Bible stories
- Plays, Pantomimes, and Tableaux for Children (1917)
- The Christmas Child (1920)
- Boys and Girls of Bookland (1923), illus. Jessie Willcox Smith
- Action Poems and Plays for Children (1923)
- Children of the Lighthouse (1924)
- Kate Douglas Wiggin as Her Sister Knew Her (1925)
- A Truly Little Girl (1927)
- The Home-Made Kindergarten, revised and enlarged (1928)
- Bee of the Cactus Country (1932), illus. Erick Berry

=== With Kate Douglas Wiggin ===
- The Story Hour: A book for the home and kindergarten (1890)
- Children's Rights: A Book of Nursery Logic (1892)
- The Republic of Childhood, 3 vols. (1895, 1896)
- Golden Numbers: a book of verse for youth, eds. (1902)
- The Posy Ring: a book of verse for children, eds. (1903) – "companion volume"
- The Fairy Ring, eds. (1906)
- Magic Casements: A Second Fairy Book, eds. (1907)
- Pinafore Palace: a book of rhymes for the nursery, eds. (1907)
- Tales of Laughter: A Third Fairy Book, eds. (1908)
- The Arabian Nights: their best-known tales, eds. (1909), illustrated by Maxfield Parrish
- Tales of Wonder: A Fourth Fairy Book, eds. (1909)
- The Talking Beasts: A Book of Fable Wisdom, eds. (1911)
- An Hour with the Fairies (1911)
- Twilight Stories: More tales for the story hour, eds. (1925)†
- A Thanksgiving Retrospect; or, Simplicity of Life in Old New England (1928) – revised ed. of a 1906 article by Wiggin

†Wiggin died in 1923 and the Library of Congress does not credit her as co-editor of Twilight Stories (LCCN 25--17938).
