= Jessie Willcox Smith =

American illustrator (1863–1935)

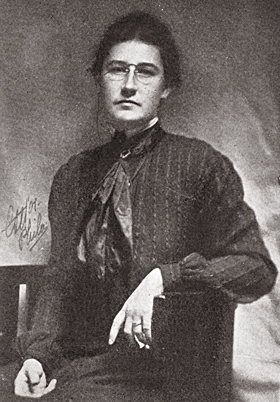
- Smith c. 1900
- Born: September 6, 1863; Philadelphia, Pennsylvania, U.S.
- Died: May 3, 1935 (aged 71); Philadelphia, Pennsylvania, U.S.
- Known for: Illustrations
- Movement: The Golden Age of Illustration
- Awards: 1902 – Bronze Medal Charleston Exposition; 1903 – Pennsylvania Academy of Fine Arts; 1911 – Beck Prize from Philadelphia Water Color Club; 1915 – Silver Medal at the Panama–Pacific Exposition
- Elected: Society of Illustrators' Hall of Fame, 1992
- Years active: 1880–1935

Jessie Willcox Smith (September 6, 1863 – May 3, 1935) was an American illustrator during the Golden Age of American illustration. She was considered "one of the greatest pure illustrators". A contributor to books and magazines during the late 19th and early 20th centuries, Smith illustrated stories and articles for clients such as Century, Collier's, Leslie's Weekly, Harper's, McClure's, Scribners, and the Ladies' Home Journal. She had an ongoing relationship with Good Housekeeping, which included a long-running Mother Goose series of illustrations and also the creation of all the Good Housekeeping covers from December 1917 to 1933. Smith illustrated over sixty books, including notable works like Louisa May Alcott's Little Women and An Old-Fashioned Girl, Henry Wadsworth Longfellow's Evangeline, and Robert Louis Stevenson's A Child's Garden of Verses.

== Early life ==
Jessie Willcox Smith was born on September 6, 1863, in the Mount Airy neighborhood of Philadelphia, Pennsylvania. She was the youngest daughter of Charles Henry Smith, an investment broker, and Katherine DeWitt Willcox Smith. Jessie attended private elementary schools. At sixteen, she was sent to Cincinnati, Ohio, to live with her cousins and finish her education. She trained to be a teacher and taught kindergarten in 1883. However, Smith found that the physical demands of working with children were too strenuous for her. She struggled to bend down to their level because of her back problems. Smith discovered her talent for drawing after being persuaded to attend an art lesson taught by a cousin.

== Career ==
=== Education and early career ===
In 1884, Smith attended the Philadelphia School of Design for Women (now Moore College of Art and Design) and in 1885 attended the Pennsylvania Academy of the Fine Arts (PAFA) in Philadelphia under the supervision of Thomas Eakins and Thomas Anshutz. It was under Eakins that Smith began to use photography as a resource in her illustrations. Although Eakins' demeanor could be difficult, particularly with female students, he became one of her first major influences. Smith's illustration Three Little Maidens All in a Row was published in the St. Nicholas Magazine in May 1888, while she was still a student at the Pennsylvania Academy. Illustration was one artistic avenue through which women could earn a living at the time. Creating illustrations for children's books or of family life was considered an appropriate career for woman artists because it drew upon maternal instincts. Alternatively, fine art that included life drawing was not deemed "ladylike". Illustration partly became viable as a result of improved color printing processes and a resurgence of book design in England.

Smith graduated from PAFA in June 1888. The same year, she was hired for an entry-level position in the advertising department of the Ladies' Home Journal. Smith's responsibilities included finishing rough sketches, designing borders, and preparing advertising art for the magazine. In this role, she illustrated Mary Wiley Staver's 1892 poetry collection New and True.

In 1894, while working at Ladies' Home Journal, Smith enrolled in classes taught by Howard Pyle at Drexel Institute, now Drexel University. She was in his first class, which was almost 50% female. Pyle pushed many artists from Smith's generation to fight for the right to illustrate for major publishing houses. He worked closely with many artists he believed to be "gifted". Smith later wrote a speech stating that working with Pyle swept away "all the cobwebs and confusions that so beset the path of the art-student." The speech was later compiled in the 1923 work "Report of the Private View of Exhibition of the Works of Howard Pyle at the Art Alliance". She studied with Pyle until 1897.

=== Red Rose Girls ===
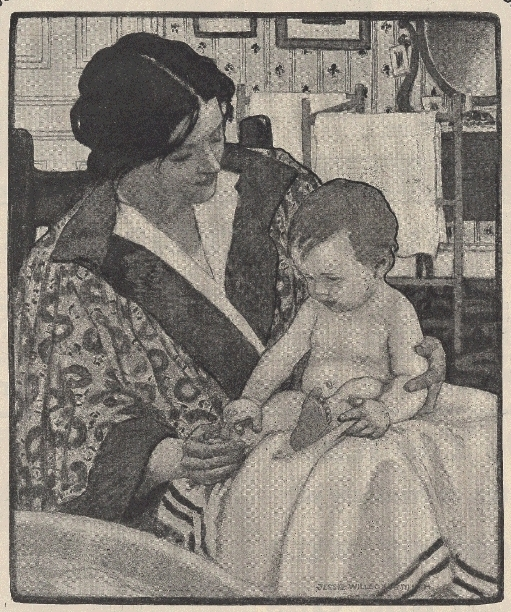
Ivory Soap illustration, 1901

While studying at Drexel, Smith met Elizabeth Shippen Green and Violet Oakley, both of whom had similar talents and mutual interests. They formed a lifelong friendship, sharing a studio on Philadelphia's Chestnut Street and working together. Oakley and Smith illustrated Henry Wadsworth Longfellow's Evangeline, published in 1897. Their teacher, Howard Pyle, helped to secure this first commission for the two artists.

At the turn of the twentieth century, Smith's career flourished. She illustrated a number of books and magazines and created an advertisement for Ivory soap. Her works were published in Scribner's, Harper's Bazaar, Harper's Weekly, and St. Nicholas Magazine. She won an award for Child Washing. Green, Smith, and Oakley became known as "The Red Rose Girls" after the Red Rose Inn in Villanova, Pennsylvania, where they lived and worked together for four years beginning in the early 1900s. They leased the inn, where they were joined by Oakley's mother, Green's parents, and Henrietta Cozens, who managed the gardens and inn. Alice Carter wrote about the women in The Red Rose Girls: An Uncommon Story of Art and Love for an exhibition of their work at the Norman Rockwell Museum. Museum Director Laurie Norton Moffatt said, "These women were considered the most influential artists of American domestic life at the turn of the twentieth century. Celebrated in their day, their poetic, idealized images still prevail as archetypes of motherhood and childhood a century later."

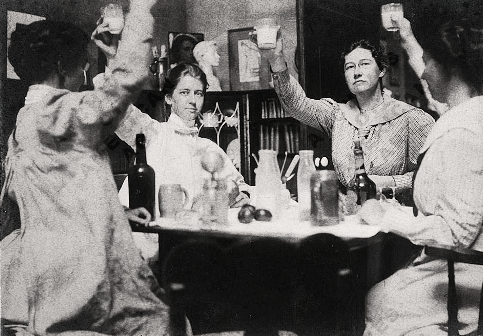
Photograph of Violet Oakley and Jessie Willcox Smith facing the camera and Elizabeth Shippen Green and Henrietta Cozens, who are partially hidden, c. 1901, Violet Oakley papers, Archives of American Art, Smithsonian Institution.

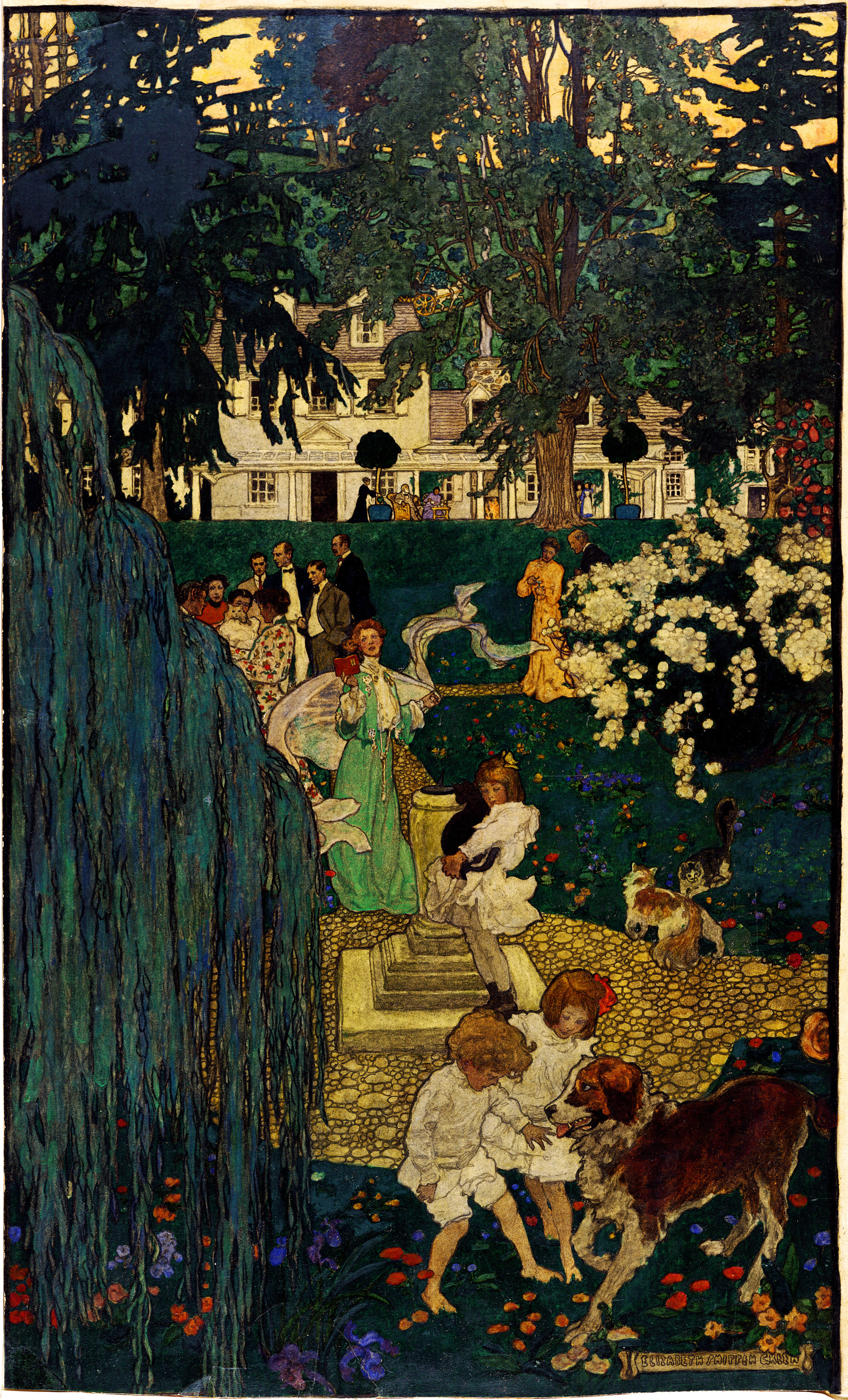
Elizabeth Shippen Green, Life was made for love and cheer, depicts the artist, Jessie Willcox Smith, Violet Oakley, and other friends at the Red Rose Inn.

Green and Smith illustrated the calendar, The Child, in 1903. Smith exhibited at the Pennsylvania Academy of the Arts that year and won the Mary Smith Prize. When the artists lost the lease on the Red Rose Inn in 1905, a farmhouse was remodeled by Frank Miles Day for them in West Mount Airy, Philadelphia. They named their new shared home and workplace "Cogslea", drawn from the initials of their surnames and that of Smith's roommate, Henrietta Cozens.

=== New Woman ===
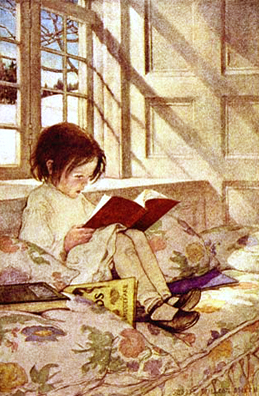
A Child's Garden of Verses, 1905

As educational opportunities opened up to women in the later 19th century, women artists joined professional enterprises, and also founded their own art associations. But artwork by 'lady artists' was considered inferior. To help overcome that stereotype, women became "increasingly vocal and confident" in promoting their work as part of the emerging image of the educated, modern and freer "New Woman". Artists "played crucial roles in representing the New Woman, both by drawing images of the icon and exemplifying this emerging type through their own lives."

In the late 19th century and early 20th century, about 88% of the subscribers to the 11,000 American magazines and periodicals were women. As more women entered the artistic community, publishers hired women to create illustrations that depicted the world through women's perspectives. Other successful illustrators were Jennie Augusta Brownscombe, Rose O'Neill, Elizabeth Shippen Green, and Violet Oakley.

=== Continued career ===
Opposed to submitting work for advertisements, Smith preferred to illustrate covers and stories, which bore her signature. Smith was particularly known for her illustrations and advertising posters featuring children and women, which appealed to millions of people.

According to the National Museum of American Illustration, Smith is regarded by many as the "greatest children's book illustrator". Her endearing portrayals of children have drawn comparisons to Mary Cassatt's work.

Smith was a member of Philadelphia's The Plastic Club (founded in 1897), which was established to promote "Art for art's sake" and to provide a means for artists to encourage one another professionally and create opportunities to sell their works. Other members included Elenore Abbott, Violet Oakley, and Elizabeth Shippen Green. All of the women who founded it were students of Howard Pyle.

In 1903, the Society of Illustrators elected Florence Scovel Shinn and Elizabeth Shippen Green as its first women members. Smith, Oakley, and May Wilson Preston became members the following year. They were associate members until 1920, when they were made full members of the organization.

In 1905 she was one of seven leading artists who contracted to work exclusively for Collier's. The others were Charles Dana Gibson, Maxfield Parrish, A. B. Frost, Frank Xavier Leyendecker, E. W. Kemble, and Frederic Remington.

According to The New York Times in 1910, Smith made about US$12,000 ($414,643 today) per year and, like Norman Rockwell and J. C. Leyendecker, became popular as a "media star".

In 1911 both her parents and her former teacher and promoter, Howard Pyle, died and Elizabeth Shippen Green married Huger Elliott. (Note: Oakley and Smith never married.) Oakley had a major mural project in the Pennsylvania state capitol in Harrisburg that kept her away from Cogslea for extended periods. Smith had a 16-room house and studio that she called Cogshill built on property near Cogslea. She lived in this house, her final home, with Cozens, her aunt, and her brother. (Note: Violet Oakley remained at Cogslea until the 1960s.)

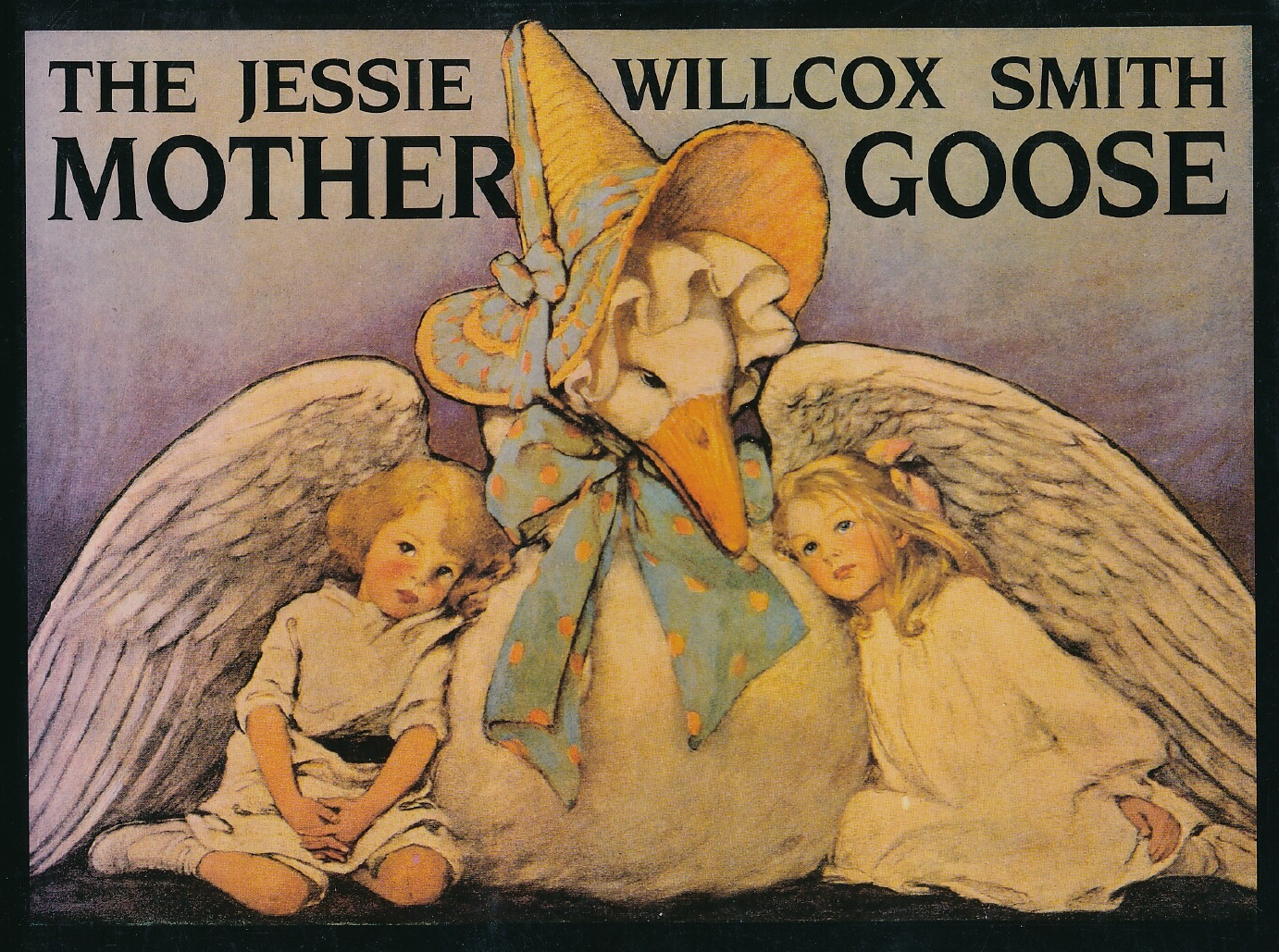
The Jessie Willcox Smith Mother Goose, 1914

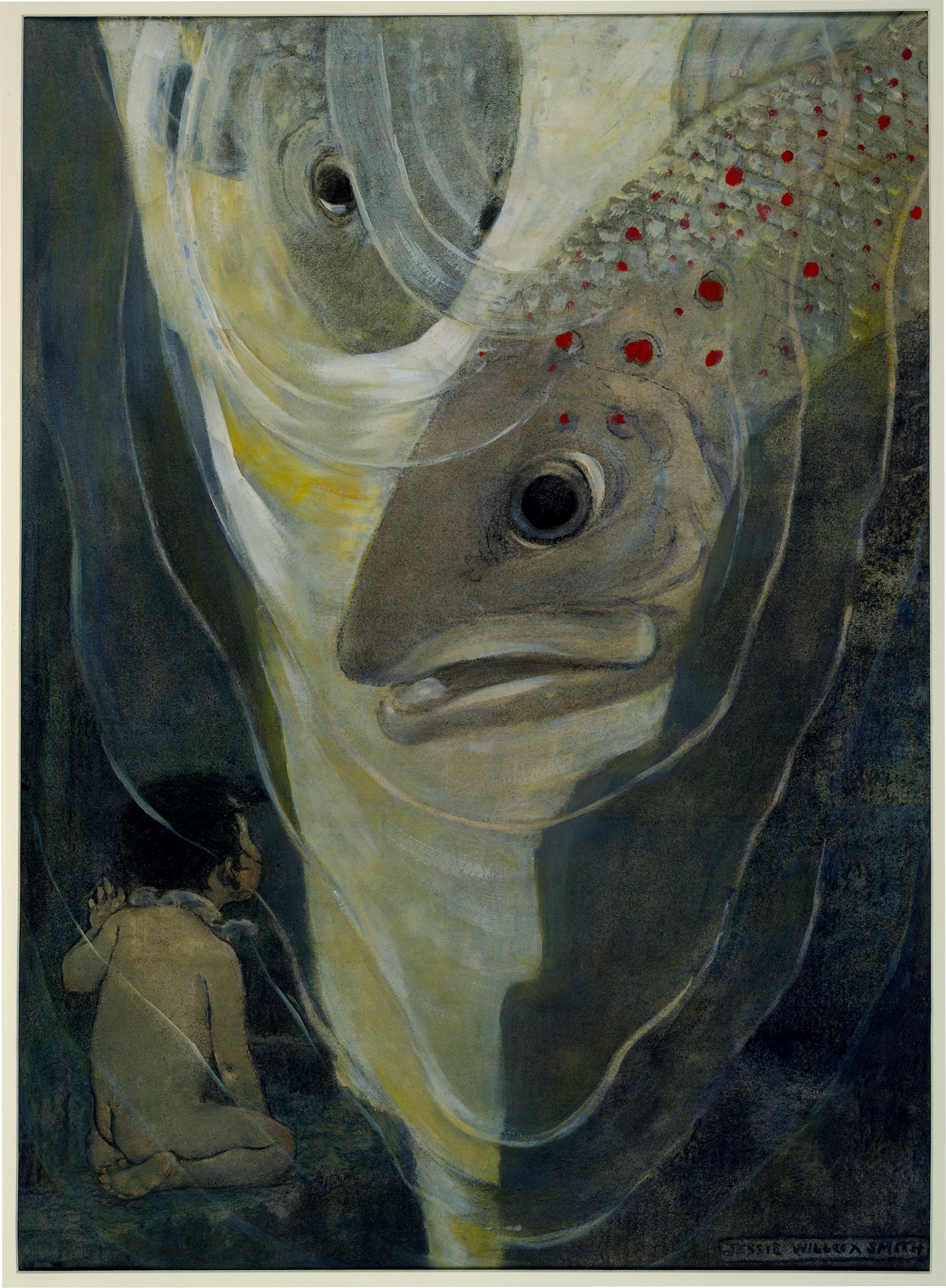
An illustration in The Water-Babies by Charles Kingsley, c. 1916

Over the next several years, she continued to create illustrations for magazines, including a series of Mother Goose illustrations printed in Good Housekeeping, which were black and white until mid-1914 when they were printed in color. Her illustrations were reproduced in the book The Jessie Willcox Smith Mother Goose by Dodd, Mead, and Company. This book, reflecting her continued theme of mother and child in a realistic portrayal, was a commercial success. Biographer Edward D. Nudelman wrote, "The cover illustration for this book, showing two children nestled beneath the wings of Mother Goose, is one of Smith's most pleasing and warm images. The serenity portrayed in the posture and expression of the children, along with the material concern of Mother Goose, gives evidence of the genius of Smith."

Smith had a knack for painting children, persuasively using milk, cookies and fairy tales to achieve a relaxed, focused child model. In an October 1917 Good Housekeeping article, she wrote that "a child will always look directly at anyone who is telling a story; so while I paint I tell tales marvelous to hear." In 1915 Smith finished one of her most well-known work, a series of pictures for Charles Kingsley's The Water-Babies.

She graced every printed cover of Good Housekeeping from December 1917 through April 1933, creating 184 illustrations of family scenes for the magazine. She is the artist with the longest continuous run of illustrated magazine covers. The magazine said of her, "Certainly no other artist is so fitted to understand us, and to make for us pictures so truly an index to what we are as a magazine are striving for. The holding up to our readers of the highest ideals of the American home, the home with that certain sweet wholesomeness one associates with a sunny living-room—and children."

She was one of the highest paid illustrators of the time, earning between $1,500 and $1,800 per cover. Smith also created illustrations for Kodak and Procter & Gamble's Ivory soap over the course of her career. She made illustrations for Collier's magazines and of Charles Dickens' works, like Tiny Tim, Dickens' Children – Ten Children, and David Copperfield.

Smith continued to create illustrations throughout her life, but she began painting more portraits around 1925. In later years, she used a technique that she learned from Eakins, using photographs as a tool when creating portraits.

=== Artistic style ===
Smith's style changed drastically throughout her life. At the beginning of her career, she used dark-lined borders to delineate brightly colored objects and people in a style described as "Japonesque". In later works, she softened the lines and colors until they almost disappeared. Smith worked in mixed media: oil, watercolor, pastels, gouache, charcoal, whatever she felt gave her desired effect. She often overlaid oils on charcoal on a paper whose grain or texture added an important element to the work. Her use of color was influenced by the French impressionist painters.

All the models I have ever had for my illustrations are just the adorable children of my kind friends, who would lend them to me for a little while. Such a thing as a paid and trained model is an abomination and a travesty on childhood—a poor little crushed and scared unnatural atom, automatically taking the pose and keeping it in a spiritless, lifeless manner. The professional child model is usually a horribly self-conscious, overdressed child whose fond parents proudly insist that he or she is just what you want, and give a list of the people for whom he or she has posed.

— Jessie Willcox Smith, 1917

Most of Smith's work is concerned with children and motherly love. Many reviewers say Smith was continually trying to recreate the image of love she had desperately needed as a child. Smith preferred to use non-professional children as opposed to child actors as models because she found professional children did not have the same soul or will to explore as amateur child models. She would invite her friends to visit and watch their children play, to use as her inspiration.

=== Death and legacy ===
Though never a travel enthusiast, Smith finally agreed to tour Europe in 1933 with Isabel Crowder, who was both Henrietta Cozens' niece and also a nurse. During her trip, her health deteriorated. Smith died in her sleep at her house at Cogshill in 1935 at the age of 71.

In 1936, the Pennsylvania Academy of the Fine Arts held a memorial retrospective exhibition of her works.

In 1991, Smith became the third woman to be inducted into The Hall of Fame of the Society of Illustrators. Lorraine Fox (1979) had been the first and Neysa Moran McMein (1984) was the second. Of the small group of women inducted since then, three were the members of The Red Rose Girls: Jessie Willcox Smith, Elizabeth Shippen Green (1994) and Violet Oakley (1996).

Smith bequeathed 14 original works to the Library of Congress' "Cabinet of American Illustration" collection to document the Golden Age of Illustration (1880–1920s). Smith's papers are on deposit in the collection of the Archives of American Art at the Smithsonian Institution.

== Collections ==
The following collections contain her works:

- Brandywine Heritage Galleries, Brandywine River Museum
- Delaware Art Museum
- Rare Book Department, Free Library of Philadelphia
- National Museum of American Illustration
- New York Public Library Digital Gallery.
- Pennsylvania Academy of the Fine Arts
- Philadelphia Museum of Art
- United States Library of Congress
- University of Michigan Museum of Art
- University of Minnesota Children's Literature Research Collection
- Chicago Public Library Special Collections.

== Works ==
Smith made illustrations for more than 250 periodicals, 200 magazine covers, 60 books, prints, calendars and posters from 1888 to 1932. She also painted portraits. Some of her works are listed below.

=== Illustrations ===
- New and True [Poems] – Mary Wiley Staver (Lee & Shepard, 1892)
- Evangeline: A Tale of Acadie – Henry Wadsworth Longfellow (1897)
- The Young Puritans in Captivity – Mary Prudence Wells Smith (Little, Brown & Co, 1899)
- Brenda's Summer at Rockley – Helen Leah Reed (1901)
- An Old-Fashioned Girl – Louisa May Alcott (1902)
- The Book of The Child [Short Stories] – Mabel Humphrey (Stokes, 1903)
- Rhymes of Real Children – Betty Sage (Duffield, 1903)
- In The Closed Room – Frances Hodgson Burnett (Hodder, 1904)
- A Child's Garden of Verses – Robert Louis Stevenson (Scribner US/Longmans Green UK, 1905)
- The Bed-Time Book – Helen Hay Whitney (Duffield US/Chatto UK, 1907)
- Dream Blocks – Aileen Cleveland Higgins (Duffield US/Chatto UK, 1908)
- The Seven Ages of Childhood – Carolyn Wells (Moffat & Yard, 1909)
- A Child's Book of Old Verses – Various Poets (Duffield, 1910)
- The Five Senses – Angela M. Keyes (1911)
- The Now-a-Days Fairy Book – Anna Alice Chapin (1911)
- A Child's Book of Stories – Penrhyn W. Coussens (1911)
- Dickens' Children – Charles Dickens (Scribner, 1912)
- Twas The Night Before Christmas – Clement Clarke Moore (1912)
- The Jessie Wilcox Smith Mother Goose (1914)
- Little Women – Louisa May Alcott (Little, Brown & Co, 1915)
- When Christmas Comes Around – Priscilla Underwood (Duffield, 1915)
- Swift's Premium Calendar (1916)
- The Water Babies – Charles Kingsley (Dodd, Mead & Co, 1916)
- The Way to Wonderland – Mary Stewart (Dodd, Mead & Co, 1917)
- At The Back of The North Wind – George MacDonald (McKay, 1919)
- The Princess and the Goblin – George MacDonald (McKay, 1920)
- Heidi – Johanna Spyri (McKay, 1922)
- Boys and Girls of Bookland – Nora Archibald Smith (Cosmopolitan Book Corporation, 1923)
- A Very Little Child's Book of Stories – Ada M. & Eleanor L. Skinner (1923)
- A Child's Book of Country Stories – Ada M. & Eleanor L. Skinner (Duffield, 1925)

=== Magazines ===
The major magazines that she illustrated include:

- Saint Nicholas Magazine (1888–1905)
- Ladies Home Journal (1896–1915)
- Ladies Home Companion until 1897, name changed to Woman's Home Companion (1896–1920)
- Collier's (1899–1916)
- Scribner's Magazine (1900–1937)
- McClure's Magazine (1903–1909)
- Good Housekeeping Magazine (1912–1933)

== Gallery ==
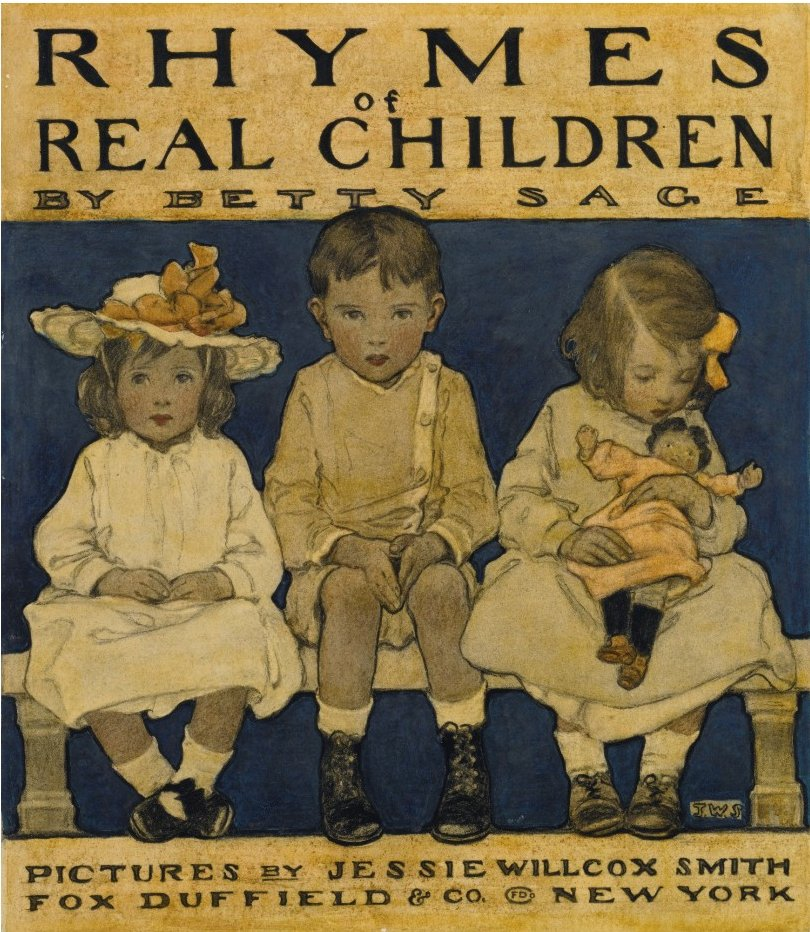
Cover of Rhymes of Real Children by Betty Sage, 1903

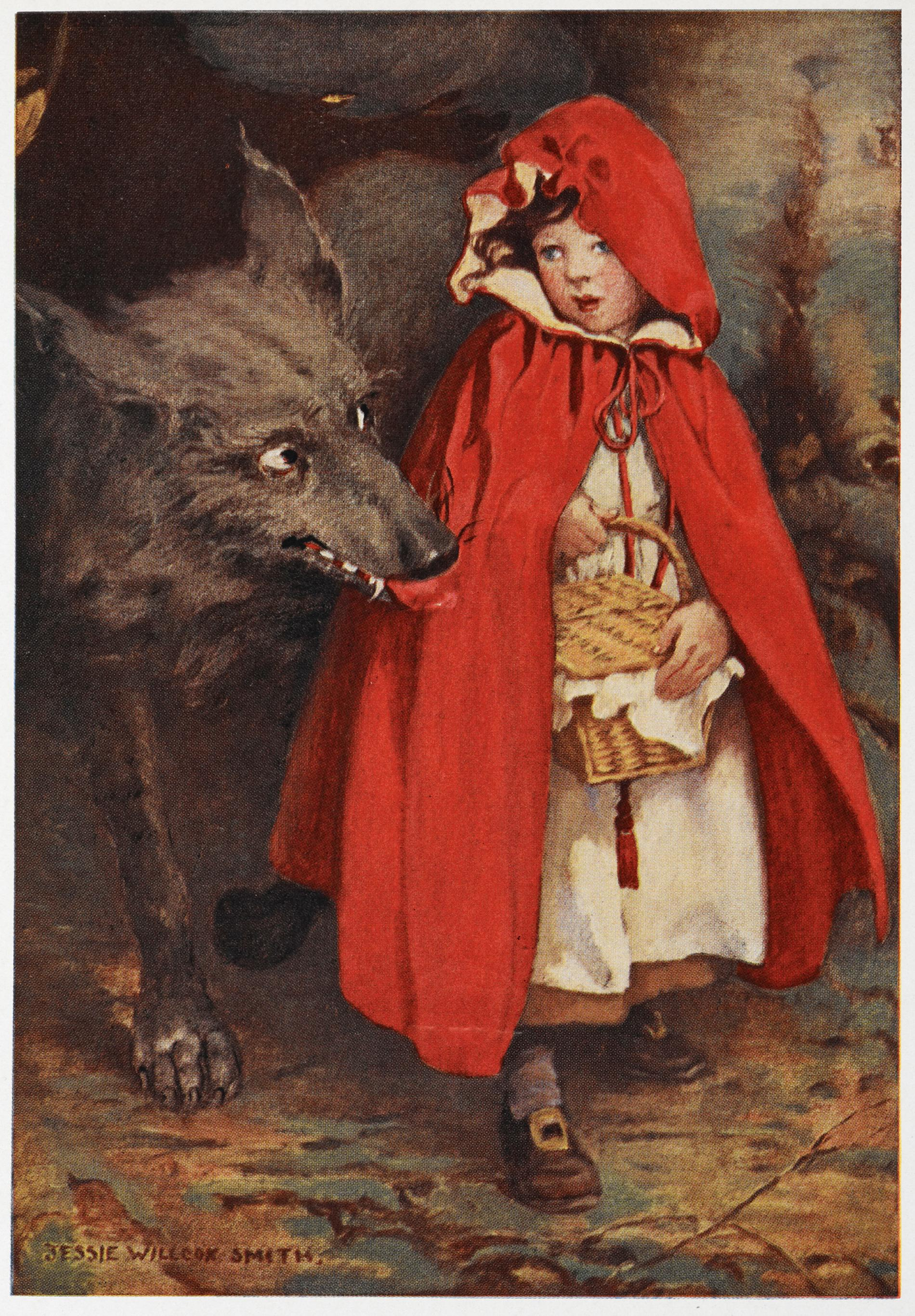
An illustration of Little Red Riding Hood in A Child's Book of Stories by Penrhyn Wingfield Coussens, 1911

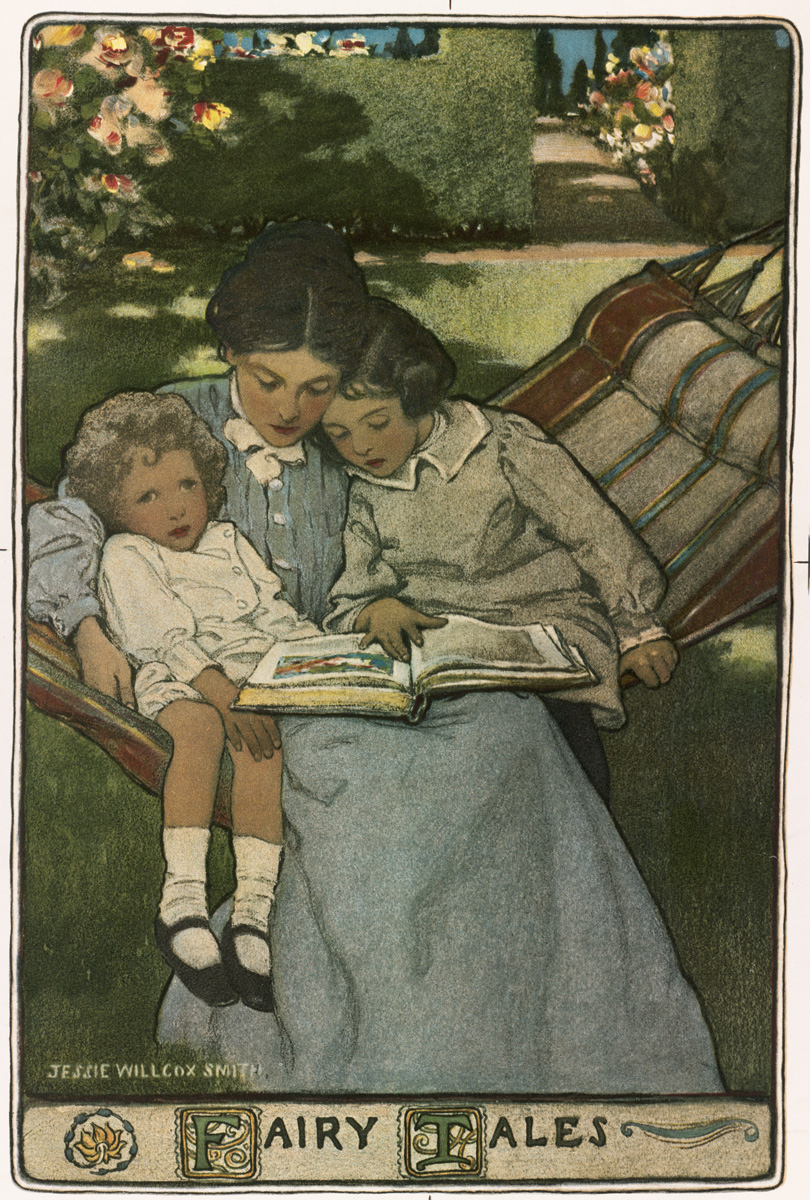
Fairy Tales, c. 1900–1904

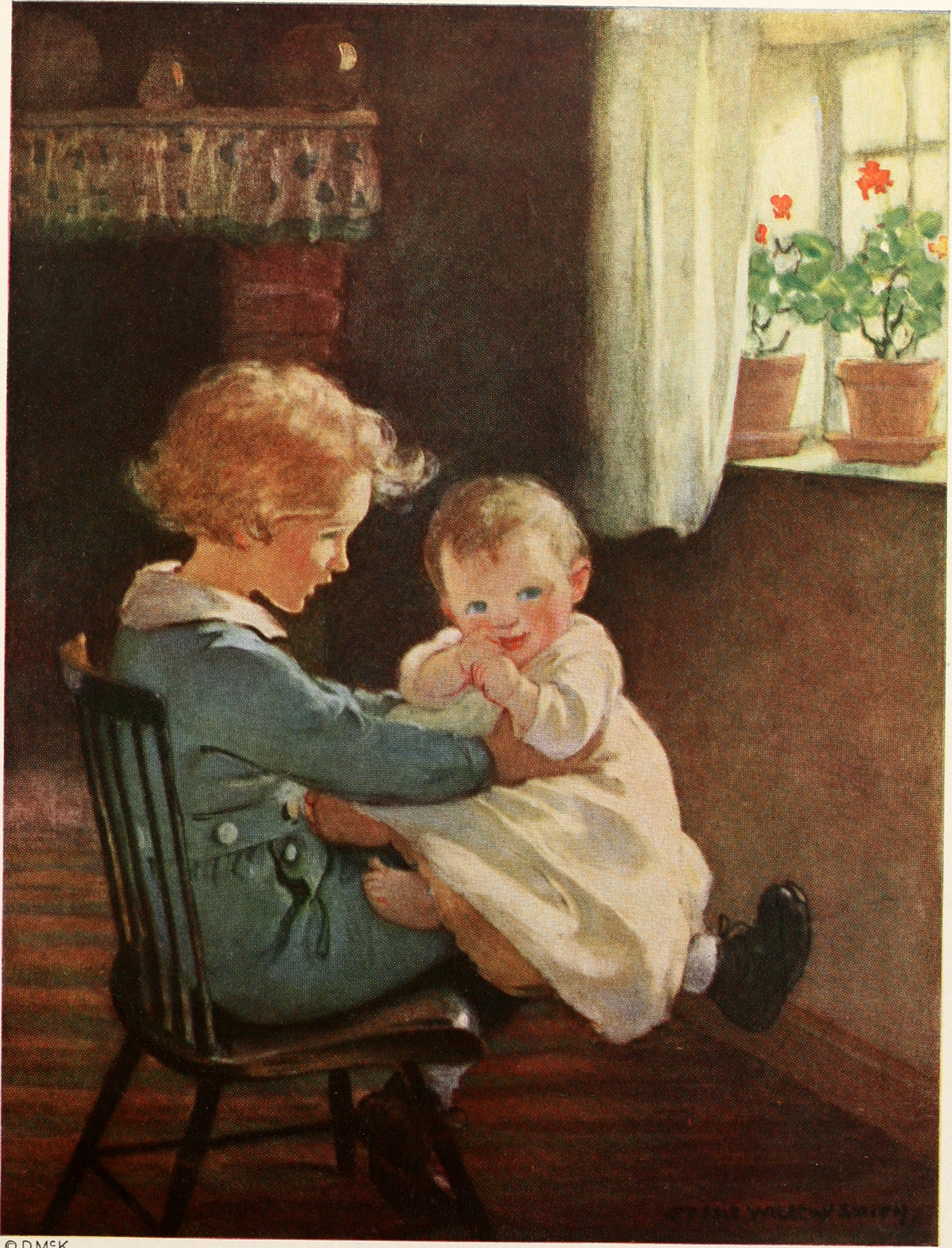
An illustration of Diamond in At the Back of the North Wind by George MacDonald, 1919

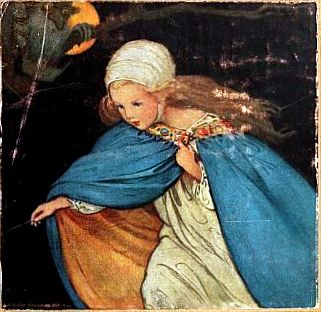
Cover of The Princess and the Goblin by George MacDonald, 1920

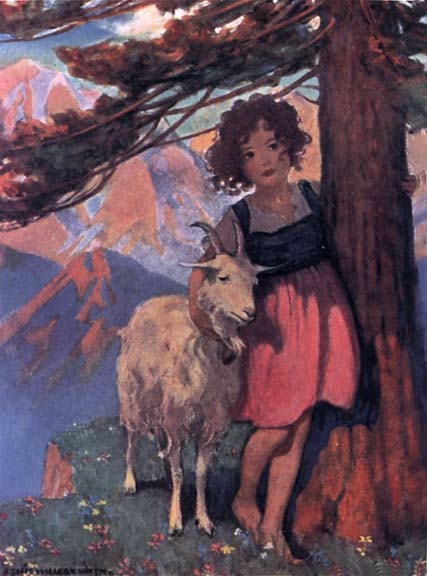
Frontispiece in Heidi by Johanna Spyri, 1922 edition

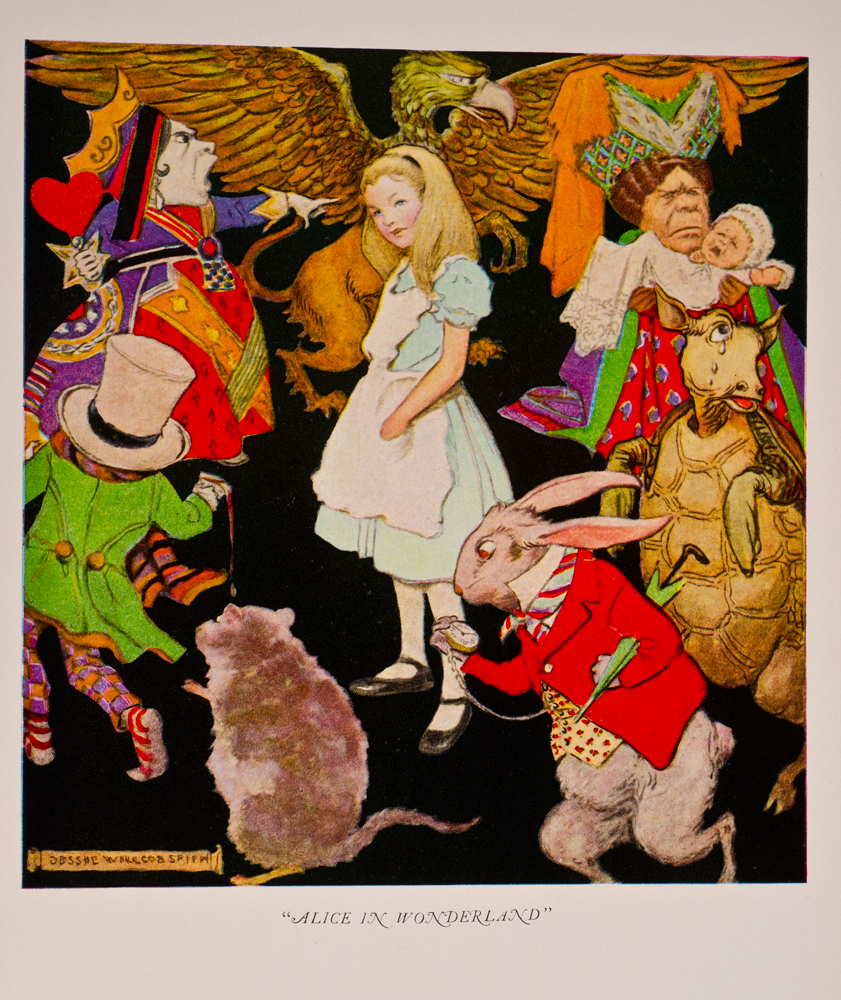
Cover of Boys and Girls of Bookland by Nora Archibald Smith, 1923
