= Harriet Judd Sartain =

American physician

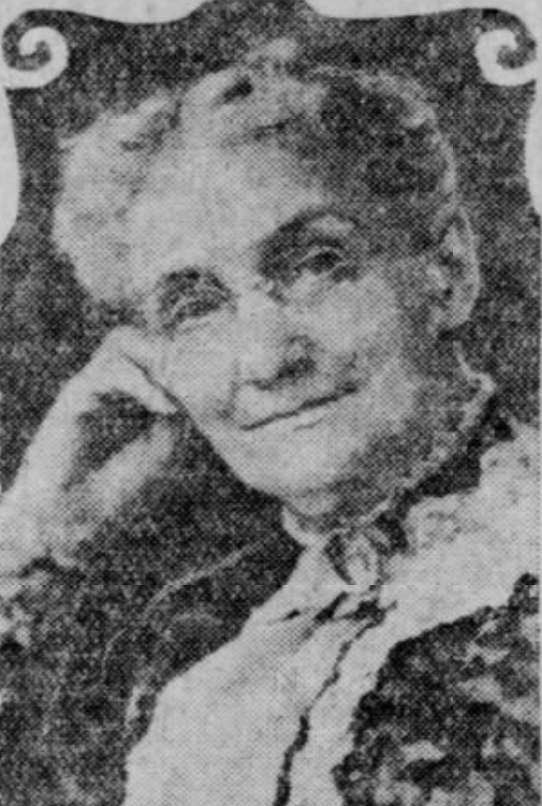
- Harriet Judd Sartain, from a 1923 newspaper
- Born: Harriet Amelia Judd; February 3, 1830; Waterbury, Connecticut, United States
- Died: February 8, 1923 (aged 93); Philadelphia, Pennsylvania, United States
- Occupation: Physician
- Relatives: John Sartain (father-in-law), Emily Sartain (sister-in-law}, William Sartain (brother-in-law), Harriet Sartain (niece)

Harriet Amelia Judd Sartain (February 3, 1830 – February 8, 1923) was an American homeopathic physician who practiced in Philadelphia. She was one of the first three women admitted to the American Institute of Homeopathy in 1871.

== Early life and education ==
Harriet Amelia Judd was born in Waterbury, Connecticut, the daughter of Thomas Judd and Eliza E. Jones Judd. She graduated from the American Hydropathic Institute in 1851, from the Woman's Medical College of Pennsylvania in 1853, and from the Eclectic Medical Institute in Cincinnati in 1854, one of the first women to complete medical training in a homeopathic program. Mary Gove Nichols and Harriet N. Austin were her mentors in the medical field.

== Career ==
Sartain practiced homeopathic medicine in Philadelphia. She supported the founding the Philadelphia County Homeopathic Medical Society in 1866, and was elected the society's first woman member in 1870. In 1871 she was also admitted to the American Institute of Homeopathy, one of the first three women accepted into that body (along with Harriet Schneider French and Mercy B. Jackson). She was suggested for membership in the Homeopathic Medical Society of Pennsylvania in 1872. In 1883 she founded and led the Women's Homeopathic Medical Club of Philadelphia. She retired from medical work for health reasons in 1889. She was also active in temperance and women's suffrage work.

== Personal life and legacy ==
Harriet Judd married engraver Samuel Sartain in 1854. His sister Emily Sartain and niece Harriet Sartain were noted artists associated with the Philadelphia School of Design for Women; his brother William Sartain and his father John Sartain were noted printers and engravers. Harriet and Samuel Sartain had three children together. Samuel Sartain died in 1906; their son Edwin died in infancy, and their daughter Amy died in 1916; only son Paul survived her when she died in Philadelphia in 1923, soon after her 93rd birthday.

Sartain's papers are part of several Sartain family collections, especially at the Historical Society of Pennsylvania and the Archives of American Art. The Harriet Judd Sartain Memorial Medical Scholarship at Bryn Mawr College was established by her son, and named in her memory.
