= Sartain =

Sartain may refer to:

- Dan Sartain, U.S. rock musician
- Gailard Sartain (1946–2025), U.S. actor, painter and illustrator
- John Sartain (1808–1897), U.S. engraver, publisher of Sartain's Magazine, first to print certain poems by Edgar Allan Poe
  - Emily Sartain (1841–1927), his daughter, U.S. engraver
  - William Sartain 1843–1924), his son, U.S. artist
- J. Peter Sartain (born 1952), U.S. Roman Catholic prelate

Also

- Sartain Hall, erected 1962 at Troy University, Alabama
