= Harriet Sartain =

American art educator

- Born: December 26, 1873; Philadelphia, Pennsylvania
- Died: March 4, 1957 (aged 83); Philadelphia, Pennsylvania
- Occupations: Artist, arts educator, college administrator
- Relatives: Harriet Judd Sartain (aunt); Emily Sartain (aunt), William Sartain (uncle), John Sartain (grandfather)

Harriet Sartain (December 26, 1873 – March 4, 1957) was an American artist, art educator and college administrator. She was dean of the Philadelphia School of Design for Women, which became part of the Moore College of Art and Design in 1932.

== Early life and education ==
Harriet Sartain was born in Philadelphia, the daughter of Henry Sartain and Anna Maria Toby Sartain. Her mother was born in England. Her father was a printer and engraver, as was her grandfather, John Sartain, and her uncle William Sartain. Another uncle, Samuel Sartain, was married to Harriet Judd Sartain (1830–1923), an early woman physician in Philadelphia. She trained as an artist at the Philadelphia School of Design for Women, with further studies at Teachers College, Columbia University.

== Career ==
Sartain painted landscapes and watercolors, and exhibited her works in Philadelphia, New York, and elsewhere, including at the World's Columbian Exposition in Chicago in 1893, and at the Louisiana Purchase Exposition in 1904.

Sartain taught art from her own studio, and was director of the art studio at Swarthmore College beginning in 1902. She was a founding member of the Plastic Club, and president of the club from 1913 to 1916. During World War I, she was first dean of the Philadelphia School of Occupational Therapy. She succeeded her aunt Emily Sartain to become dean of the Philadelphia School of Design for Women in 1920. When that school merged with the Moore Institute in 1932, she was dean of the joint institution until her retirement in 1946.

In 1941, the Philadelphia Art Alliance recognized Sartain with a distinguished service medal designed by John R. Sinnock. She was an active member of the National Association of Women Painters and Sculptors, the Art Teachers Association of Philadelphia, the Eastern Art Association, the Women's National Farm and Garden Association, and many other clubs and organizations.

== Publications ==
- "Light and Shade in Photography" (1901)
- "Definite Training in the Appreciation of Beauty and its Function in Human Happiness" (1926)

== Death and legacy ==
Sartain died in 1957, at a hospital in Philadelphia, at the age of 83. Moore College of Art and Design offers a Harriet Sartain Fellowship to fund student travel. Moore College also has a dormitory named Sartain Hall, in honor of the Sartain family, including Harriet and Emily Sartain. Her papers are part of the Sartain Family Papers collections at the Historical Society of Pennsylvania and at the Pennsylvania Academy of the Fine Arts.
