= Florence Esté =

American painter

- Born: 1860; Cincinnati, Ohio
- Died: April 25, 1926 (aged 65–66); Paris, France
- Occupation: Painter

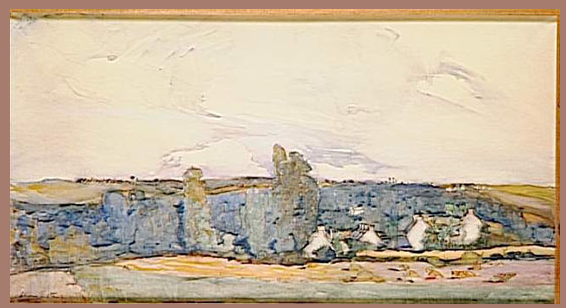
Florence Esté, Un Bourg breton, purchased by the French government in 1918

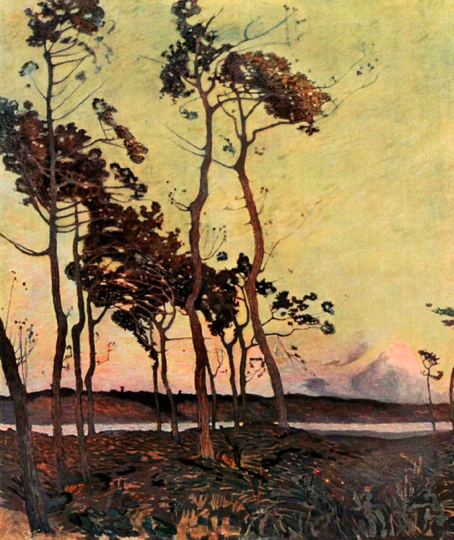
Florence Esté, La Baie de l'Orne, 1911

Florence Esté (1860 – April 25, 1926) was an American painter in oils born in Cincinnati, Ohio. She also worked in watercolors, pastels, and as an etcher and engraver. She was particularly well known for her landscapes, which were said to have been influenced by Japanese artworks and were noted for their "harmony of color". Her obituary in the New York Times referred to her as "one of the best known women landscape painters."

== Education and career ==
In 1874, a teenage Esté traveled to France with Emily Sartain, studying with Tony Robert-Fleury and working in the comrade d'atelier of Emily Sartain and Jeanne Rongier.

Between 1876 and 1882, she studied with Thomas Eakins at the Pennsylvania Academy of the Fine Arts. Around 1886–1887, she, her friend Cecilia Beaux and other young women artists such as Dora Brown and Julia Foote studied with William Sartain in private art classes at the Philadelphia School of Design for Women where his sister Emily Sartain was principal.

In 1884, Esté learned to etch on the press of Stephen Parrish. Parrish and fellow etcher Stephen Ferris were enrolled in the men's life class at the Pennsylvania Academy. A number of the women at the Academy became significant in the American etching revival, including Esté, Gabrielle Clements, Blanche Dillaye, Margaret Lesley, Margaret Levin, and Mary Franklin.

Florence Esté moved permanently to France in 1888. In Paris she enrolled at the Academie Colarossi and studied with Alexandre Nozal (1852–1929) and Raphael Collin (1850–1916). She remained in France during the first world war. Her compatriot Elizabeth Nourse reported in 1915 that "Florence Esté is painting again in Paris after an exciting summer, for the village where she was working had to be evacuated at the approach of the enemy."

She became a member of the Société Nationale des Beaux-Arts in France around 1909 and exhibited at the Paris salons. Her painting Un Bourg breton (A Breton village) was purchased by the French government in 1918. Her painting La Vallée (The Valley) was purchased by the State in 1921. Some of her paintings were hung in the Luxembourg Gallery in Paris.

She was also an honorary member of the Philadelphia Water Color Club, and continued to exhibit in America at the Annual Philadelphia Watercolour Exhibition, the Art Institute of Chicago and the Pennsylvania Academy of Fine Arts. Her watercolors won the PAFA prize in 1925.

== Armory Show of 1913 ==
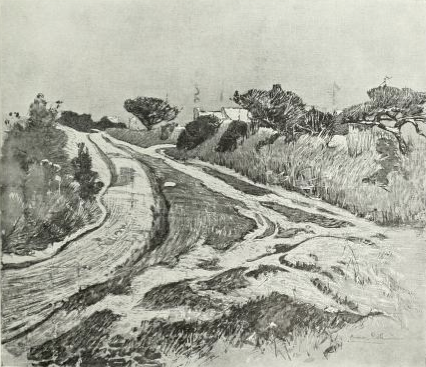
Black and white photograph of Florence Esté, The First Snow, watercolor, ca. 1909

The 1913 Armory Show featured the American Association of Painters and Sculptors (AAPS), and was one of the first exhibitions of "new art" or modern art. Fifty women participated as artists and donors in this revolutionary show, making up one sixth of the contributions. These women can be considered significant leaders, forging the beginnings of the feminist art movement.

Esté exhibited two of her watercolors, The Village (variously $500 or $200) and The First Snow($300) at the 1913 Armory Show. The First Snow was previously shown in the Philadelphia Water-Color Exhibition, where it was received the following review: "An interesting picture, almost in monotone, by Miss Florence Esté, entitled The First Snow, was most effective in the simplicity of the medium on a tinted background."

== Personal life ==
Among Esté's good friends included fellow students from the Pennsylvania Academy, Elizabeth MacDowell, Alice Barber Stephens, Mary K. Trotter, and Gabrielle D. Clements.

Florence Esté died in Paris on April 25, 1926.

== Sources ==
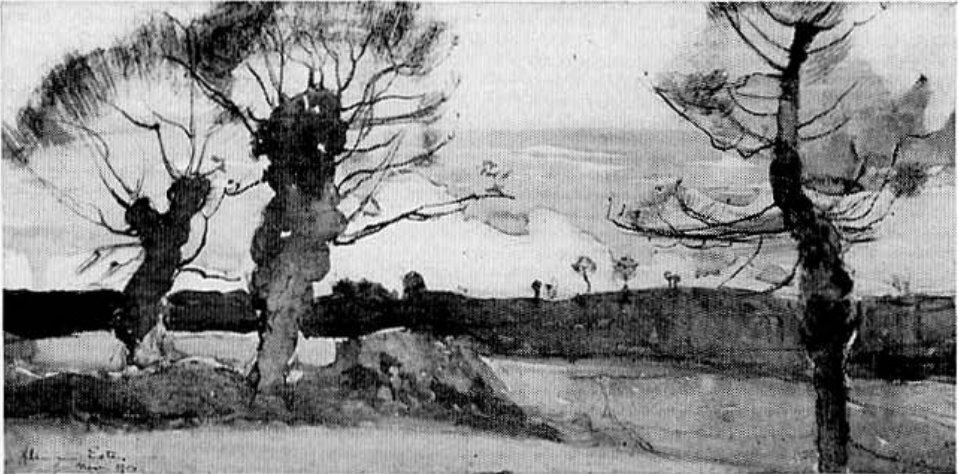
November by Florence Esté, b&w reprint

- Clark, Edna Maria (1975). Ohio art and artists. Detroit: Gale Research. ISBN 978-0810340589.
- Peet, Phyllis (1988). American women of the etching revival : February 9 – May 9, 1988, High Museum of Art, Atlanta, Georgia. Atlanta, Ga.: The Museum. ISBN 978-0939802456.
- "Obituary", American Art Annual, vol. 4. Washington, D. C.: American Federation of Arts, 1926.
