= Mary K. Trotter =

American painter

Mary Kempton Trotter
- Born: August 3, 1859 (Note: Her birthdate is consistently given as August 3 but on varying years. However, she is listed as being aged 10 during the 1870 Census conducted June 1.); Philadelphia, Pennsylvania
- Died: April 1925 (aged 65); Paris, France
- Education: Pennsylvania Academy of the Fine Arts
- Known for: Painter
- Awards: Mary Smith Prize; 1882

Mary Kempton Trotter (August 3, 1859 – c. April 1925) was an American artist who studied in Philadelphia before moving to Paris.

== Early life ==
Mary K. Trotter was born in Pennsylvania, the daughter of Anna Patterson and William Trotter, a wholesale grocer. She had a younger brother, Albert (1860–1932). Living with the family in Philadelphia was her aunt, Margaret C. Trotter and two servant women from Ireland.

== Education and career ==
Trotter studied at the Pennsylvania Academy of the Fine Arts by 1880, when her work was exhibited at the Fifty-First Annual Exhibition,

The most noticeable work from those who have studied in the schools is contributed by Miss Mary K. Trotter. Her two portrait studies, Nos. 97 and 150 of the catalogue, are both admirably well painted, handled with remarkable firmness and freedom, while at the same time giving evidence of patient, tentative care. In these portraits Miss Trotter exhibits masterly qualities.

She won the Mary Smith Prize in 1882. In 1884, her work was exhibited at the National Academy in New York. In 1886, her portraits where shown at the Academy with other women artists, such as Cecilia Beaux, Gabrielle D. Clements, Lucy D. Holme, and Emily Sartain, who were also winners of the annual Smith Prize between 1881 and 1892. Sartain and Beaux sat on the Hanging Committee for the show, the first time that women sat on the jury for an art exhibition in the "history of art". Once critic commented that "the gentler sex is taking to art with a good deal of energy ... [and] a good deal of success." A fire at the Academy resulted in the loss of works of art by a number of artists, included Trotter, in 1886.

She studied at Académie Colarossi in Paris with other Americans and English students. The instructors were Gustave Courtois and Pascal Dagnan-Bouveret. Beaux, also a student, described one night at Colarossi's, "We went with Miss Trotter and after passing through a hall of a house, descended into a strange court gleaming with broken statues, and bas reliefs, models standing around with a little flickering light falling on them. Then up and up long dark flights of stairs with only a small flaming lamp on the top step to light us into a vast atelier, where the men were fixing the gas lights not yet lighted. We didn't get started until half past-seven. Had a darling little Italian boy for a model. The most graceful, charming intelligent creature with enormous dark eyes, the brow of Apollo when you could get a glimpse of it under his shock of black hair. He entertained us with acrobatic performances during the rests."

In the summer of 1888, Trotter studied with Charles Lazar at the art colony in Concarneau, France. Other students from the Pennsylvania Academy at the art colony that summer were Beaux, Holme, and Florence Esté. People who regularly lived at the colony during the summers included Howard Russell Butler, Walter Gay, Clifford Grayson, Arthur Hoeber, Lovell Birge Harrison, and Edward Simmons.

Her painting, Lamplight, described as a notable work by The New York Times, was shown at the National Academy of Design show in April 1891.

== Personal life ==
Trotter returned to the United States for visits. In the summer of 1897 and she visited friends in the Media, Pennsylvania Quaker community. She stayed at Idlewild until October. Four years later, she visited with her mother at the Penhurst mansion. She died in Chartres where she lived, 40 rue de Chanzy, on February 8, 1925 She died, leaving an estate of $12,000 (equivalent to $220,304 in 2025).
