= The Plastic Club =

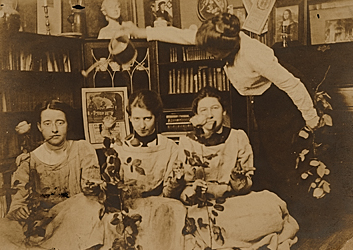
- Plastic Club members in their early Chestnut Street studio, c. 1901
- Established: 1897; 129 years ago
- Founder: Emily Sartain
- Founded at: Philadelphia, Pennsylvania, U.S.
- Purpose: arts organization for women to promote collaboration and members' works
- Headquarters: 247 South Camac Street
- Location: Philadelphia, Pennsylvania
- President (1897): Blanche Dillaye
- Website: www.plasticclub.org

The Plastic Club is an arts organization located in Philadelphia, Pennsylvania. Founded in 1897 for women only, the Plastic Club is one of the oldest art clubs in the United States. It is located on the 200 block of Camac Street, the "Little Street of Clubs" that was a cultural destination in the early 1900s. Since 1991, the club's membership also includes men.

== History ==
The Plastic Club was founded by art educator Emily Sartain. It was founded as an arts organization for women to promote collaboration and members' works, partly in response to the Philadelphia Sketch Club, an exclusively male arts club. The first President was the etcher Blanche Dillaye. The word "plastic" was chosen, at the suggestion of Dillaye, to refer to "the state of any unfinished work of art". The motto of the club was taken from a poem by Theophile Gautier:

All passes. Art alone
Enduring stays to us;
The Bust outlasts the throne,—
The Coin, Tiberius

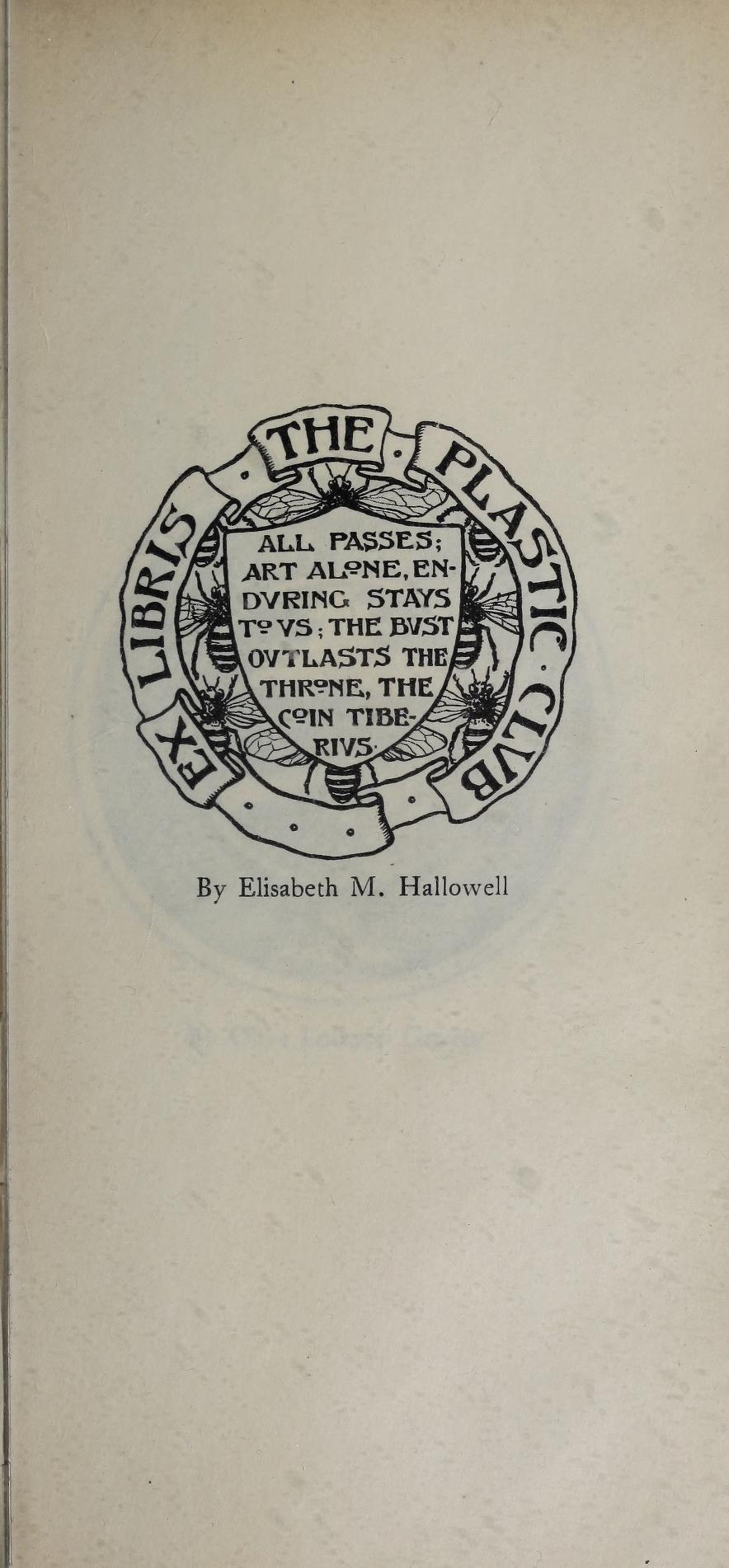
Insignia of The Plastic Club

The Plastic Club insignia was designed by Elisabeth Hallowell Saunders.

The club offered art classes, social events, and exhibitions. Its annual masquerade party was called "the Rabbit."

Early members included Elenore Plaisted Abbott, Paula Himmelsbach Balano, Cecilia Beaux, Fern Coppedge, Elizabeth Shippen Green, Charlotte Harding, Frances Tipton Hunter, Violet Oakley, Emily and Harriet Sartain, Jessie Willcox Smith, and Alice Barber Stephens, many of whom had been students of Howard Pyle. When the fall exhibition was held in 1898, the works of Pyle's former students, including Elizabeth Fearne Bonsall, Elizabeth Shippen Green, Jessie Willcox Smith, Charlotte Harding, Violet Oakley, and Angela De Cora, were singled out.

In 1918, the club was involved in the founding of the Philadelphia School of Occupational Therapy, reflecting the connection between occupational therapy and the Arts and Crafts movement in the United States between the Civil War and World War I.

In 1991, the organization opened its membership to include men. During the 1990s the club also sought to attract art students, offering free membership to two recent graduates a year.

The Plastic Club building at 247 South Camac Street was added to the Philadelphia Register of Historic Places in 1962.

== Noted past members ==
The Plastic Club has identified the following noted past members:

- Elenore Plaisted Abbott
- Paula Himmelsbach Balano
- Cecilia Beaux
- Mary Carnell
- Fern T. Coppedge
- Blanche Dillaye
- Grace Gebbie Wiederseim Drayton
- Katherine Levin Farrell
- Beatrice Fenton
- Beatrice Fox
- Elizabeth Shippen Green
- Violet Oakley
- Amy Otis
- Esther Richards
- Harriet Roosevelt Richards
- Harriet Sartain
- Emily Sartain
- Jessie Willcox Smith
- Wuanita Smith
- Alice Barber Stephens
- Alice Kent Stoddard
- Beatrice Pastorius Turner
- Paulette Van Roekens
- Pearl Van Sciver
- Sarah Stilwell Weber
- Mathilde Weil
