= Elisabeth Hallowell Saunders =

American scientific illustrator (1861–1910)

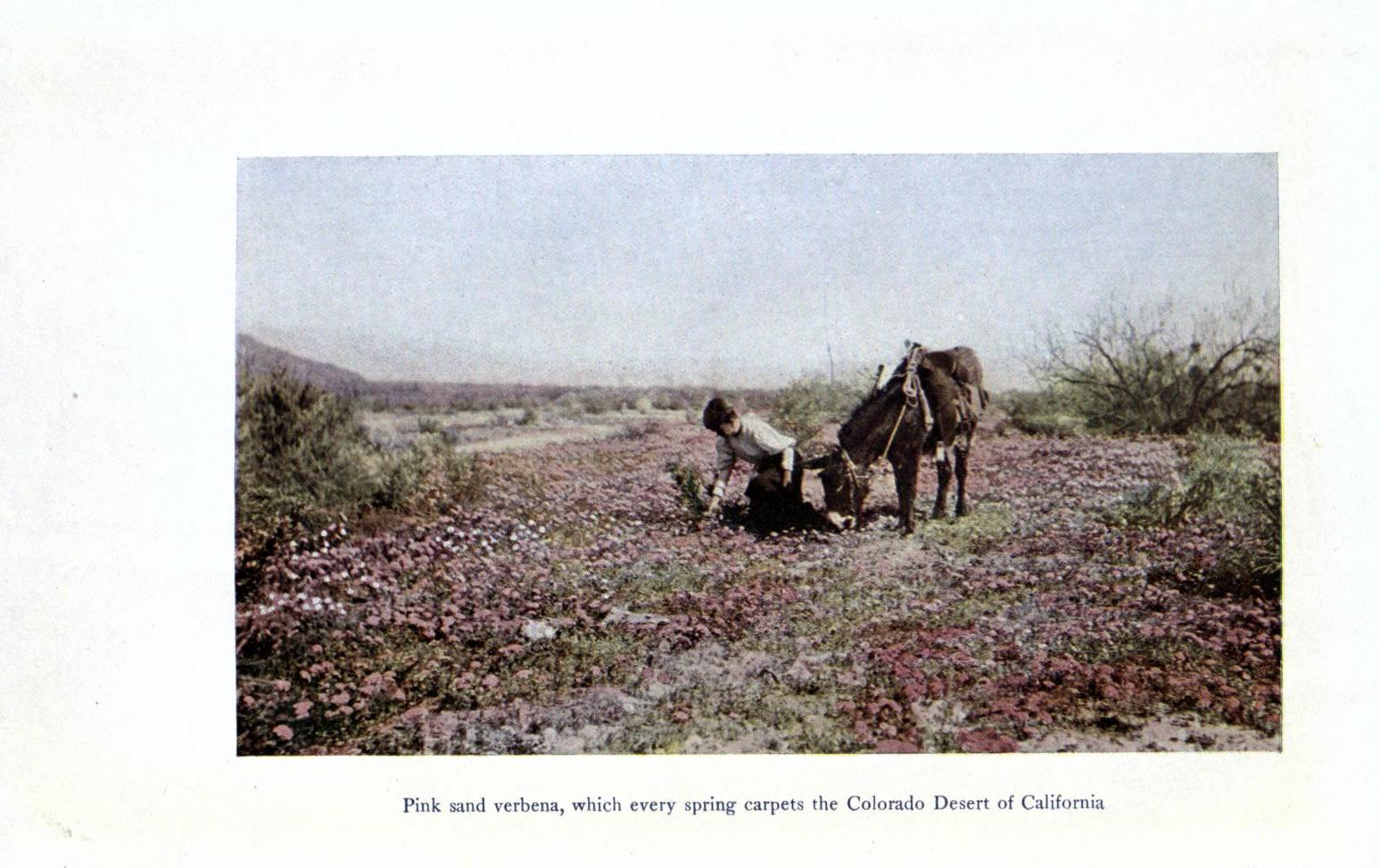
- Born: Elisabeth Moore Hallowell; February 21, 1861; Alexandria, Virginia
- Died: 1910; Pasadena, Los Angeles County
- Spouse: Charles Francis Saunders

Elisabeth Moore Hallowell Saunders (February 21, 1861 – 1910) was an American botanical illustrator, author and photographer. Her best known works are illustrations and photographs she completed for her and her husband's books. A collection of her photographs is held by the Huntington Library.

== Early life ==
Saunders was born Elisabeth Moore Hallowell on the February 2, 1861 to Anne Reese and Caleb S. Hallowell in Alexandria, Virginia. In 1888 Saunders studied art with Howard Pyle in Philadelphia. In that year Saunders formed a walking club with her future husband Charles Francis Saunders and Henry Troth. Saunders was an avid naturalist and gained the nickname "The Botanist" from the other two. They visited inns in Philadelphia, which culminated in a collaborated book Inns and Outs. The book was written by Charles and illustrated by Saunders and Troth.

In 1891 Saunders was a student at the Pennsylvania Museum and School of Industrial Art where she was awarded first place in the Richards Prize for her portfolio of etchings.

== Career ==
Saunders worked at the Pennsylvania Museum and School of Industrial Art in 1893 as an instructor in pen and ink drawing. She continued to teach there until 1900 when she took a leave of absence as a result of ill health.

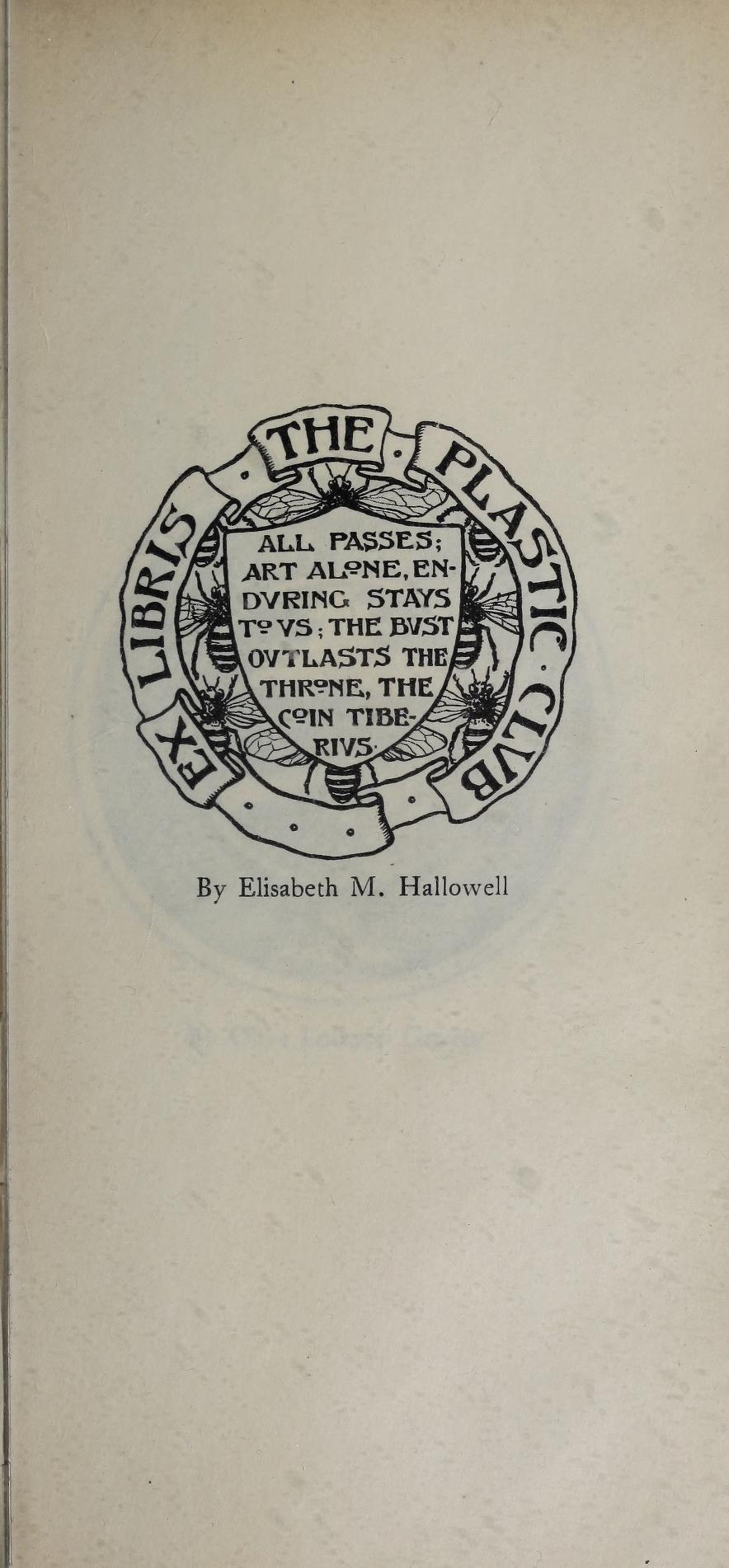
Bookplate for The Plastic Club

During this time Saunders was a member of The Plastic Club, an arts organisation for women to promote collaboration and members' works. In 1902 Saunders designed the bookplate and insignia for the club.

Also in 1902 she married Charles and they honeymooned in California and the American southwest. In 1904 Charles published his first book, a book of poems dedicated to Saunders and entitled In a Poppy Garden. Saunders illustrated that volume. The following year Saunders published a book of illustrations, California Wild Flowers. Charles wrote the descriptive text for that work.

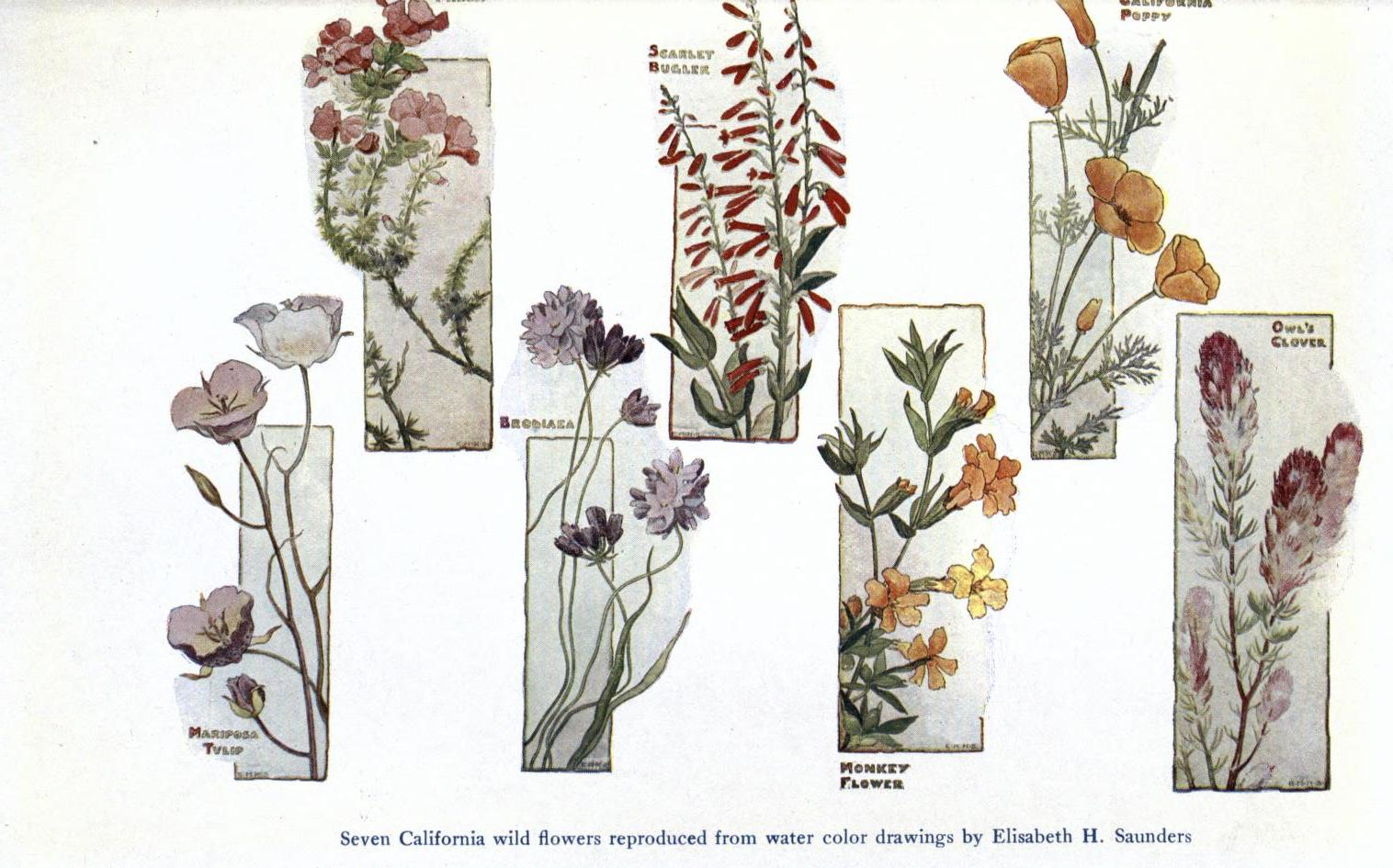

Partly in an attempt to improve Saunders failing health, the couple moved to Pasadena in 1906. Along with her illustration work, Saunders was a keen photographer. Many of her photographs were used to illustrate Charles' books including The Indians of the Terraced Houses and Under the Sky in California, both of which were published after her death.

Saunders died in Pasadena in 1910.
