= Abby Howe Turner =

American zoologist (1875–1957)

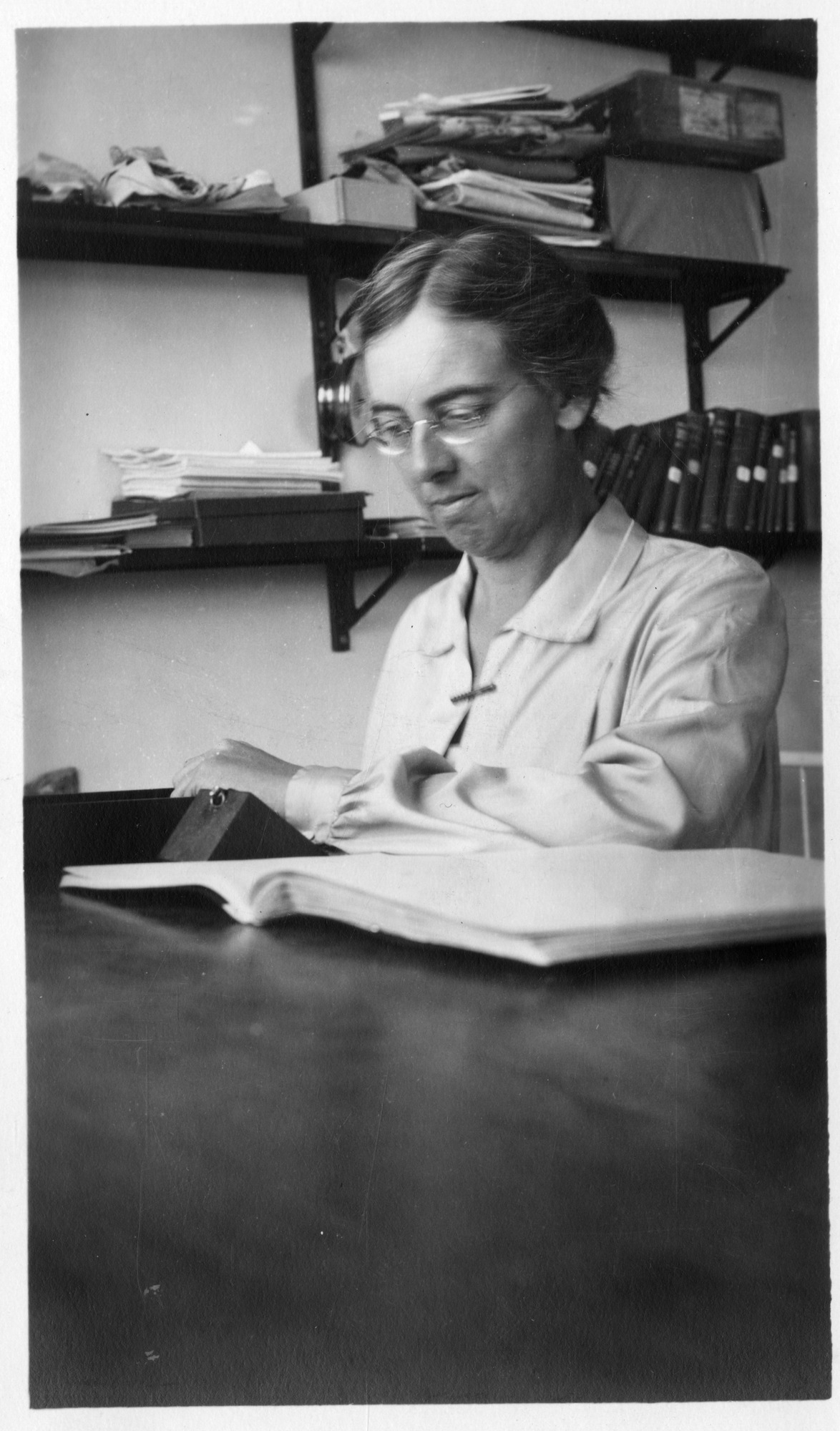
- Born: February 21, 1875; Nashua, New Hampshire, United States
- Died: November 26, 1957 (age 82)
- Other names: Abbie Howe Turner, Abbey Howe Turner, A. H. Turner
- Education: Radcliffe College
- Known for: Exploring colloid osmotic pressure and gravity's effect on the circulatory system
- Scientific career
- Fields: Physiology; zoology
- Workplaces: Mount Holyoke College

Abby Howe Turner (February 21, 1875 – November 26, 1957) was a professor of physiology and zoology who founded the department of physiology at Mount Holyoke College. She specialized in colloid osmotic pressure and circulatory reactions to gravity.

== Early life and education ==
Turner was born in Nashua, New Hampshire. She was the daughter of Emeline Mehitabel Cogswell and George Turner. She received her B.A. from Mount Holyoke in 1896. She then studied at the University of Pennsylvania form 1901-1902 where she studied zoology botany and psychology, the University of Chicago, and the Harvard Medical School. She received her Ph.D. from Radcliffe College in 1926, with a dissertation titled "Respiratory and Circulatory Tests of Physical Fitness in Healthy Young Women".

== Career ==
Turner established and was the head of the physiology department from 1922 to 1940. She did research on students while she both taught and worked in a lab at Mount Holyoke from 1896 until her retirement in 1940. She then went on to become the acting head of the Physiology department at Wilson College between 1943–1944. She specialized in colloid osmotic pressure and circulatory reactions to gravity. In some of her studies, Turner worked with student majoring in physiology and physical education to study the effects of posture on blood flow on the female body and effects of physical activity on women's bodies. She attended international conferences, mostly in Europe, and spent a year as a fellow at the University of Copenhagen, sponsored by the AAUW. She spent several summers at Woods Hole Marine Biological Laboratory.

In 1928, Turner was elected to membership in the American Physiological Society. From 1943 to 1944, she was interim head of the physiology department at Wilson College. She also taught in the Bryn Mawr nursing program during World War II. In 1945, Wilson College gave Turner an honorary doctorate, in recognition of her contributions to the school. In 1946, she received the Alumnae Medal from the Mount Holyoke Alumnae Association.

== Personal life and legacy ==
Turner was an intimate friend of the psychiatrist and author Esther Loring Richards, and they engaged in a long exchange of written correspondence, which is physically and digitally archived by Mount Holyoke College. The words used in the letter have been digitally counted and categorized based on frequency of appearance. A visual representation of the frequency of the words in the correspondence was also created.

In 1937 Abby Howe Turner lived at Mount Holyoke College South Hadley MA.

Housed within the collections at Mount Holyoke College, the Abby H. Turner papers are a collection of her life's work, including notebooks, laboratory manuals and photographs. This collection also includes her PhD thesis titled, "Respiratory and Circulatory Test of Physical Fitness in Healthy Young Women", as well as physical vital records of students at Mount Holyoke College from 1931–1935.

Abby Howe Turner died in 1957 at the age of eighty-two while in South Hadley, Massachusetts. Mount Holyoke College named the Abbey Howe Turner Award for Excellence in Biology in her memory.
