= Christian Schussele =

American painter (1824–1879)

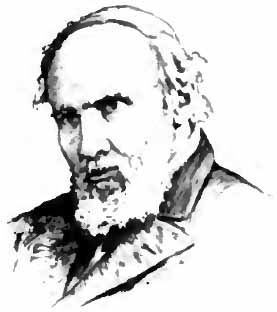
Portrait of Schussele

Schussele's signautre

Christian Schussele (born 16 April 1824 – 20 August 1879) was a French-born American painter and teacher who is credited with designing the Medal of Honor. He was known for his printmaking, drawing, and portrait painting. Schussele taught painting at the Pennsylvania Academy (now Pennsylvania Academy of the Fine Arts) in Philadelphia.

== Life ==
Christian Schussele was born on 16 April 1824 in Guebwiller, Alsace, France.

He studied under Adolphe Yvon and Paul Delaroche from 1842 to 1848 and then came to the United States. Here, for some time, he worked at chromolithography which he had also pursued in France. Later he devoted himself almost entirely to painting.

His Men of Progress (1857) featured a group portrait of nineteen American inventors and innovators. While all those portrayed were still alive, they had never met as a group but were composed from existing individual portraits. It is now housed in Cooper Union, New York City.

Other well-known works include Clear the Track (1851); Franklin Appearing Before The Privy Council (1856) (housed in the San Marino, California Huntington Library, Art Museum, and Botanical Gardens); Zeisberger preaching to the Indians (1859); The Iron-Worker and King Solomon (1860); Washington at Valley Forge (1862); McClellan at Antietam (1863); and Home on Furlough (1864).

About 1863, he was attacked by palsy in the right hand. In 1865, he went abroad and underwent severe treatment with no apparent benefit. On his return, in 1868, he was elected to fill the chair, then founded, of drawing and painting in the Pennsylvania Academy (now Pennsylvania Academy of the Fine Arts) in Philadelphia, which he held until his death in 1879. During this period he produced Queen Esther denouncing Haman, owned by the Academy (1869), and The Alsatian Fair (1870). Most of the paintings that have been named became widely known through large prints by John Sartain and other engravers.

Painter Thomas Eakins covered Schussele's classes when he was too ill to teach. Eakins succeeded Schussele as instructor of painting and drawing at the Academy.

He died of a stroke on 20 August 1879, in Merchantville, New Jersey.

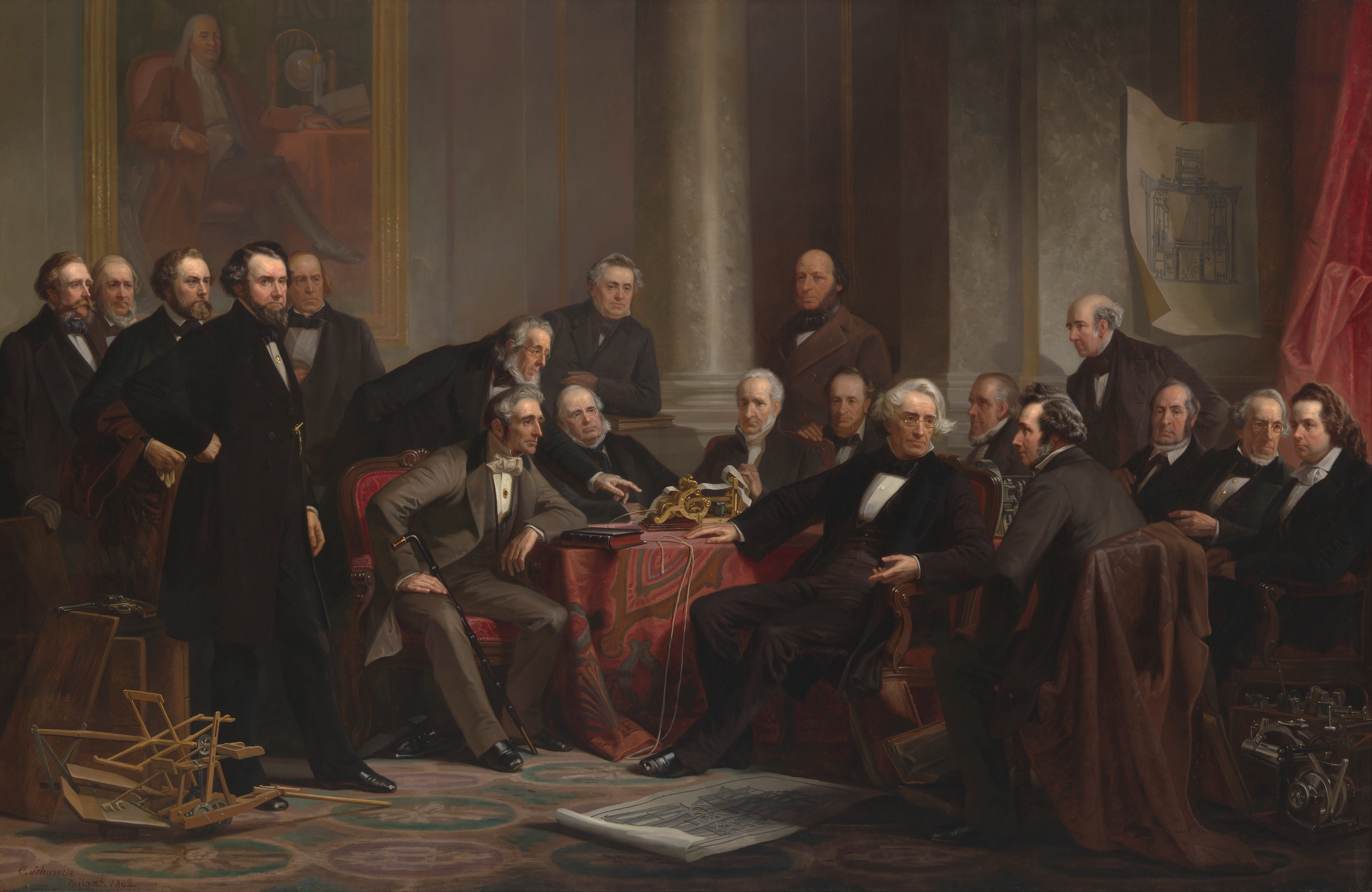
Men of Progress (1857), Cooper Union, New York City.

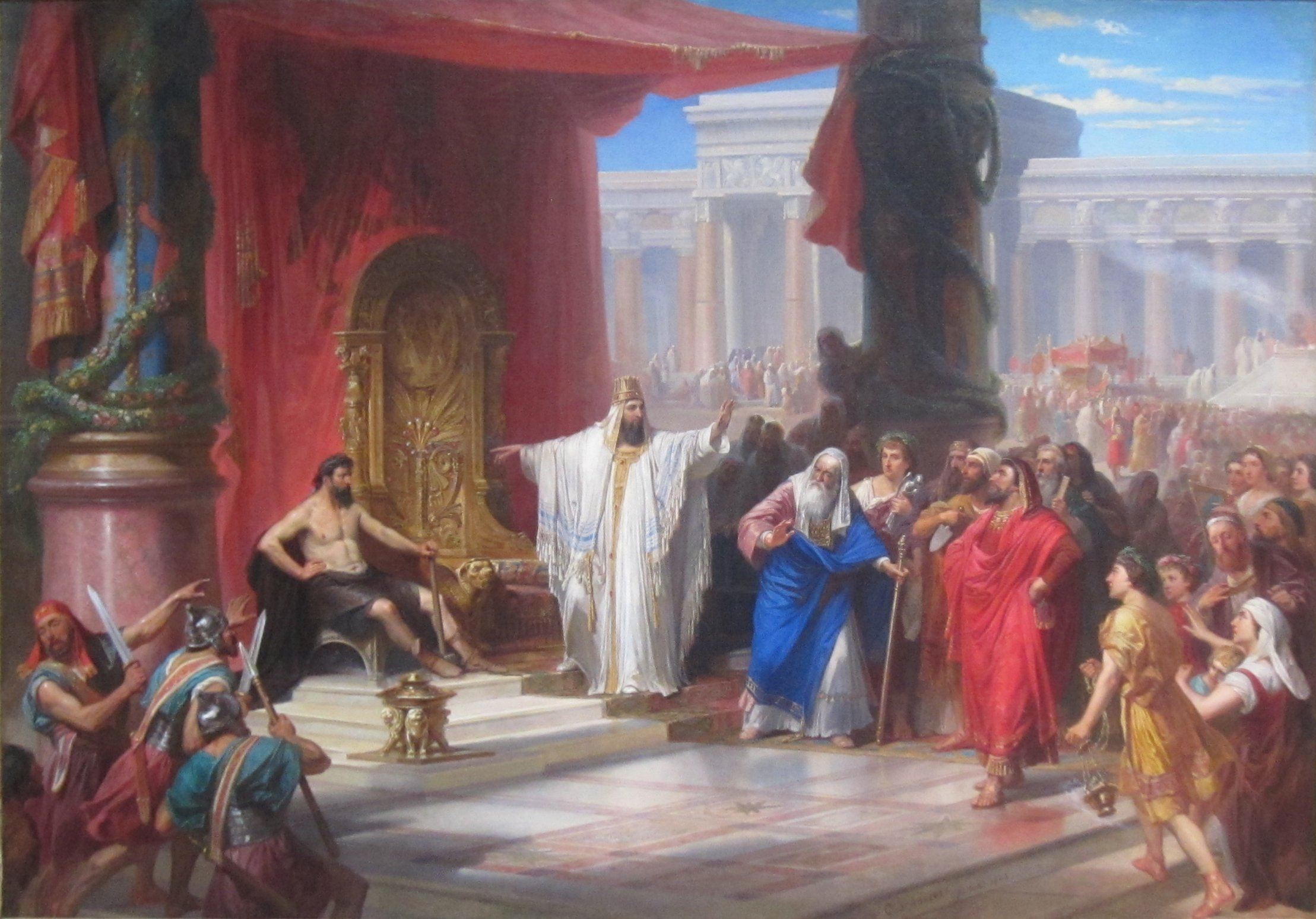
King Solomon and the Iron Worker (1863), Pennsylvania Academy of the Fine Arts, Philadelphia.

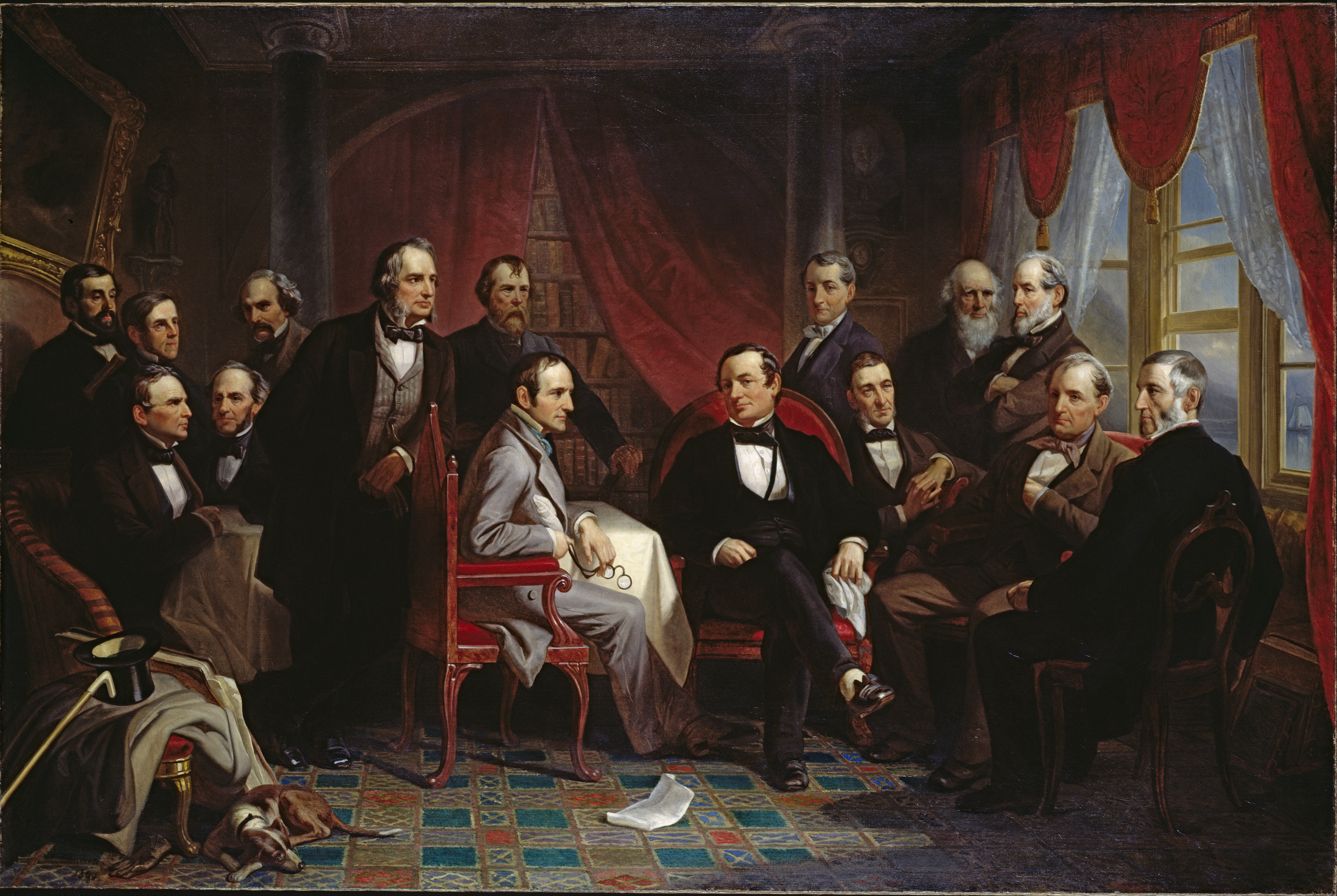
Washington Irving and his Literary Friends at Sunnyside (1864), National Portrait Gallery, Washington, D.C.

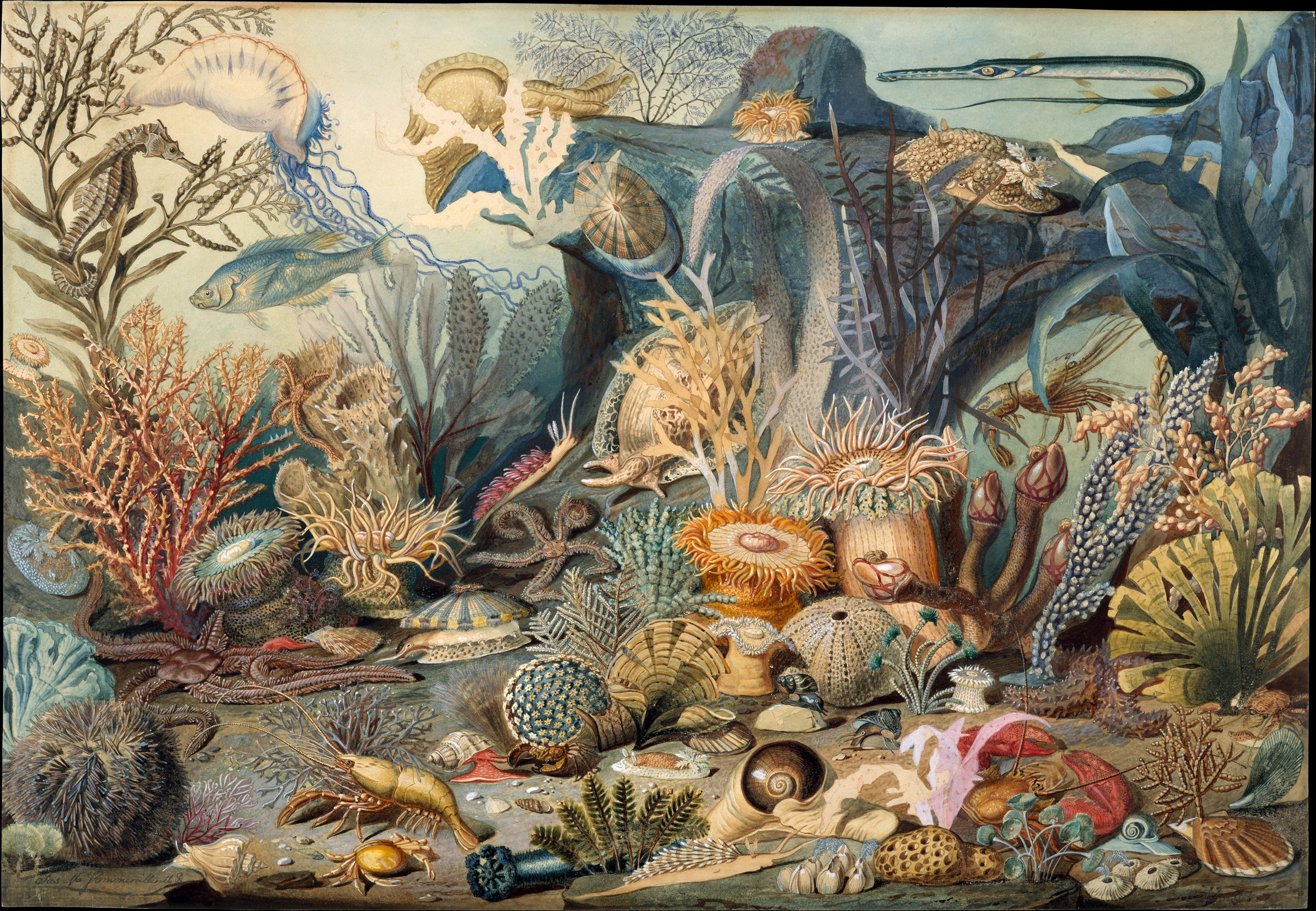
Ocean Life, circa 1859, Metropolitan Museum of Art, New York
