= Esther Loring Richards =

American psychiatrist (1885–1956)

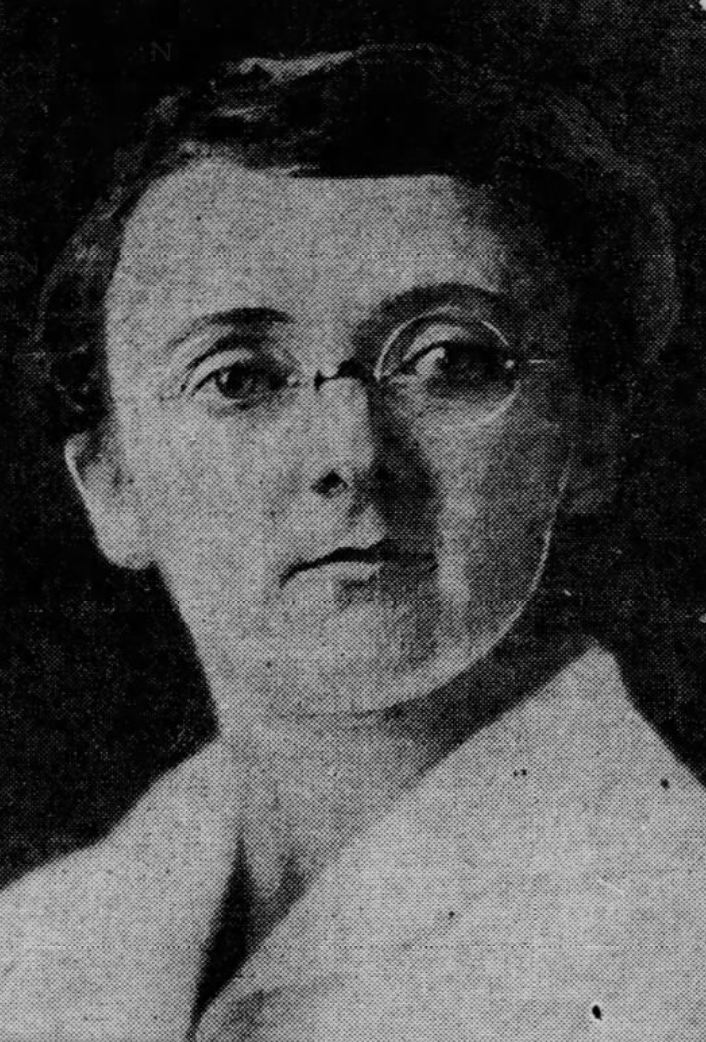
- Esther Loring Richards, from a 1924 newspaper
- Born: June 6, 1885; Holliston, Massachusetts
- Died: July 6, 1956 (aged 71); Baltimore, Maryland
- Occupation: Child psychiatrist

Esther Loring Richards (June 6, 1885 – July 6, 1956) was an American physician and child psychiatrist, based in Baltimore. She was on the faculty at Johns Hopkins School of Medicine, and psychiatrist-in-charge of the outpatient department at the Henry Phipps Psychiatric Clinic from 1920 until 1951.

== Early life and education ==
Richards was born in Holliston, Massachusetts, the daughter of David Jay Richards and Esther (Etta) Coffin Loring Richards. Her father was a Harvard-educated teacher and farmer. She graduated from Mount Holyoke College in 1910, and completed her medical degree at Johns Hopkins School of Medicine in 1915.

== Career ==
Richards was on the faculty at Johns Hopkins School of Medicine, and psychiatrist-in-charge of the outpatient department at the Henry Phipps Psychiatric Clinic from 1920 until 1951. Much of her work focused on child psychiatry, and on studies of mental hygiene. She was also consulting physician for the Baltimore City Hospitals.

Richards presented at the First International Congress on Mental Hygiene in 1930, in Washington, D.C. She opposed the Eighteenth Amendment, and joined the Woman's Organization for National Prohibition Reform in 1931, saying "prohibition, whether of the use of alcohol or anything else we may want or wish to do, will never develop in us or any people self control, a sense of social responsibility, or the ability to make wise choices for ourselves."

In 1946, Richards and ten other women, including Lise Meitner, Virginia Gildersleeve, and Agnes de Mille, were honored by the National Press Club as the outstanding women of 1945.

== Publications ==
Richards published several books, and her work appeared in academic journals, including The New England Journal of Medicine, Archives of Neurology and Psychiatry, The Journal of Pediatrics, The American Journal of Nursing, American Physical Education Review, The Pacific Coast Journal of Nursing, The Public Health Nurse, and American Journal of Public Health.

- "A Study of the Invalid Reaction" (1919)
- "Psychopathological Observations in a Group of Feeble-Minded" (1919)
- "Some adaptive difficulties found in school children" (1920)
- "Mental Hygiene Problems of Normal Childhood and Youth" (1921)
- "The role of situation in psychopathological conditions" (1921)
- The elementary school and the individual child (1923)
- "The Trail of Mental Hygiene in Public Health Nursing" (1924)
- "Conservation of Social Energy" (1924)
- "The Interdependence of Body and Mind in Health and Sickness" (1926)
- "Mental Hygiene and the Student Nurse" (1928)
- "Mental Aspects of Play" (1929)
- Behaviour aspects of child conduct (1932)
- "All Men are Not Equal" (1934)
- "Practical Features in the Study and Treatment of Anxiety States" (1934)
- "Nursing: A Profession or a Technic?" (1935)
- "Relationship of Declining Intelligence Quotients to Maladjustments in School Children" (1937)
- "Following the hypochondriacal child for a decade" (1941)
- Introduction to psychobiology and psychiatry, a textbook for nurses (1941, 1946)
- "Psychological Aspects of the Menopause" (1941)
- "A History of Medical Psychology" (1942)

== Personal life ==
Richards died in 1956, at the age of 71, at her Baltimore home. Her papers are in the Chesney Archives at Johns Hopkins. Her personal letters to zoologist Abby Howe Turner are in the collection of Mount Holyoke College. The Esther Loring Richards Children's Center in Owings Mills, Maryland, was opened in 1958, and named in her memory.
