= Mercy B. Jackson =

American physician (1802–1877)

- Born: Mercy Ruggles; September 17, 1802; Hardwick, Massachusetts, United States
- Died: December 13, 1877 (aged 75); Boston, Massachusetts, United States
- Education: New England Female Medical College
- Known for: Early female physician
- Scientific career
- Fields: Homeopath

Mercy Ruggles Bisbee Jackson (17 September 1802 – 13 December 1877) was an American medical doctor. She was one of the first women to earn a Doctor of Medicine degree, specifically in obstetrics and gynecology.

== Domestic life ==
Mercy Ruggles was born in Hardwick, Massachusetts on September 17, 1802, to Constant Ruggles, Esq. and his wife.

At that time, women who were interested in the healthcare field were restricted to work as nurses, midwives, or 'healers'. Ruggles was able to attend school, and at the age of 17 she graduated from a private school in Hardwick. Shortly after her graduation, she moved to Plainfield to take up a temporary teaching job. She then returned to Hardwick and married her first husband Reverend John Bisbee in 1823. Jackson and Bisbee had three children together, one of whom died in infancy from scarlet fever, and another dying of pneumonia in 1832. Jackson was left a widow in 1829 when Bisbee died unexpectedly from pneumonia.

At this time, she opened a school for young ladies, giving them a very basic education. She then met her second husband Capt. Daniel Jackson who had four children from a previous marriage. The two married in 1833 and moved to Plymouth, Massachusetts. The couple had eight children together, only four of whom survived.

== Education ==
Jackson bore eleven children in her life, and mothered four more. This fueled her interest gynecology, and medical research as a whole. While in Plymouth, she practiced homeopathic medicine while educating herself with medical books.

In 1852, her second husband died of cancer. At this point she became serious about her studies and felt that she needed a more formal education and training. Jackson returned to school in her 50s to study homeopathy. At this time homeopathy was very popular in the US and there were 22 homeopathic medical schools, including the New York School of Medicine and the medical school at the University of Michigan.

In 1860, at the age of 58, Jackson earned the Doctor of Medicine degree at Boston's New England Female Medical College (1860) now known as Boston University School of Medicine. She graduated with Caroline Hastings and Mary Jane Safford.

== Career ==
Jackson was heavily involved in American homeopathy in the 19th century, and attended several conventions as a speaker and presenter. In 1861 she applied to join the American Institute of Homeopathy, but was rejected as she was not a man; she was finally admitted in 1871.

She specialized in Obstetrics and Gynaecology with a heavy focus on uterine hemorrhaging. Problems such as 'displacement of the uterus' were common in this time, and it was thought to affect a woman's ability to bear children, as well as her overall health and wellbeing. The suggested treatments for this included scarification, electricity, cauterization, and abdominal supporters which were dangerous to a women's health. For uterine hemorrhaging, the most common treatment was putting ice on it and hoping that the bleeding would stop.

Jackson was one of many homeopaths that took an interest in changing this practice in order to make it less dangerous and more comfortable for the patient. She became known to many women across the country and was preferred by many patients. She had a good track record, with many patients responding positively to her treatment. Throughout her life, she was mentioned in many homeopathic journals in both the US and Britain. She later became the first woman to be inducted into the American Institute of Homeopathy.

In 1873 she became adjunct professor at the Boston School of Medicine. She was also on the board of directors for the Women's Educational and Industrial Union and published several articles in the Woman's Journal.

Mercy Ruggles Bisbee Jackson died December 13, 1877, in Boston, Massachusetts and is buried at Oak Grove Cemetery in Plymouth, Massachusetts.

== Citations ==
- Hanaford, Phebe A. Daughters of America; Or, Women of the Century. Augusta, Me.: True, 1882. Print.
- Port, Jane. "Mercy B. Jackson, M.D." Pilgrim Hall Museum. Web.
- Kirschmann, Anne Taylor. Vital Force: Women in American Homeopathy. New Brunswick, NJ, USA: Rutgers University Press, 2003. ProQuest ebrary. Web. 22 February 2016.
- Jeançon, J. A. Diseases of the Sexual Organs: Anatomy, Normal and Morbid; Pathology, Physical Diagnosis and Treatment of the Diseases of Those Organs. Cincinnati: Progress Pub., 1887. Print.
