= Blanche Dillaye =

American printmaker (1851–1931)

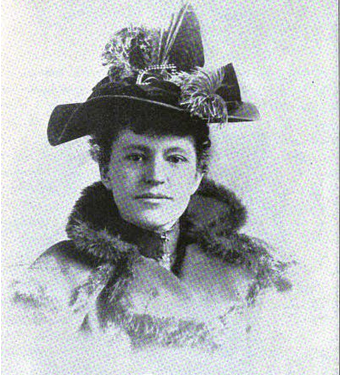
- Born: 1851; Syracuse, New York, United States
- Died: December 29, 1931; Philadelphia, Pennsylvania, United States
- Other names: Annie Blanche Dillaye
- Education: Pennsylvania Academy of the Fine Arts
- Occupation(s): Visual artist, printmaker, painter, illustrator
- Known for: Etching
- Father: Stephen D. Dillaye

Blanche Annie Dillaye (sometimes Annie Blanche Dillaye; 1851 – 1931) was a 19th-century artist from the U.S. state of New York. After studying at the Pennsylvania Academy of Fine Arts, she became one of the significant figures in the American etching revival movement. She acquired prominence in one of the most difficult of arts, and was accepted in some respects as an authority in a field where far more men than women were in competition.

== Early years and education ==
Blanche Dillaye was born in 1851, in Syracuse, New York. She was the daughter of Charlotte B. Malcolm Dillaye and the Hon. Stephen D. Dillaye, of Syracuse, whose writings on economic subjects such as paper money and the tariff won him an enviable reputation. She was of French heritage.

She was educated at Miss Mary L. Bonney and Miss Harriette L. Dillaye's school (later known as the Ogontz School for Young Ladies; still later, known as Penn State Abington) for young ladies. In the school, as had been the case from early childhood, Dillaye evinced a talent for drawing, and a genuine artistic appreciation of pictures. So marked was her ability and so strong her desire to be an artist, that she was allowed to devote a year to the study of drawing. She went abroad, but her final work came in connection with the Philadelphia Academy of Fine Arts.

After returning from abroad, she taught in a young ladies' school in Philadelphia. This enabled her to study at the Pennsylvania Academy of the Fine Arts in Philadelphia from 1877 to 1882, under painter Thomas Eakins.

She traveled to Paris, and studied under Leandro Ramón Garrido.

== Career ==
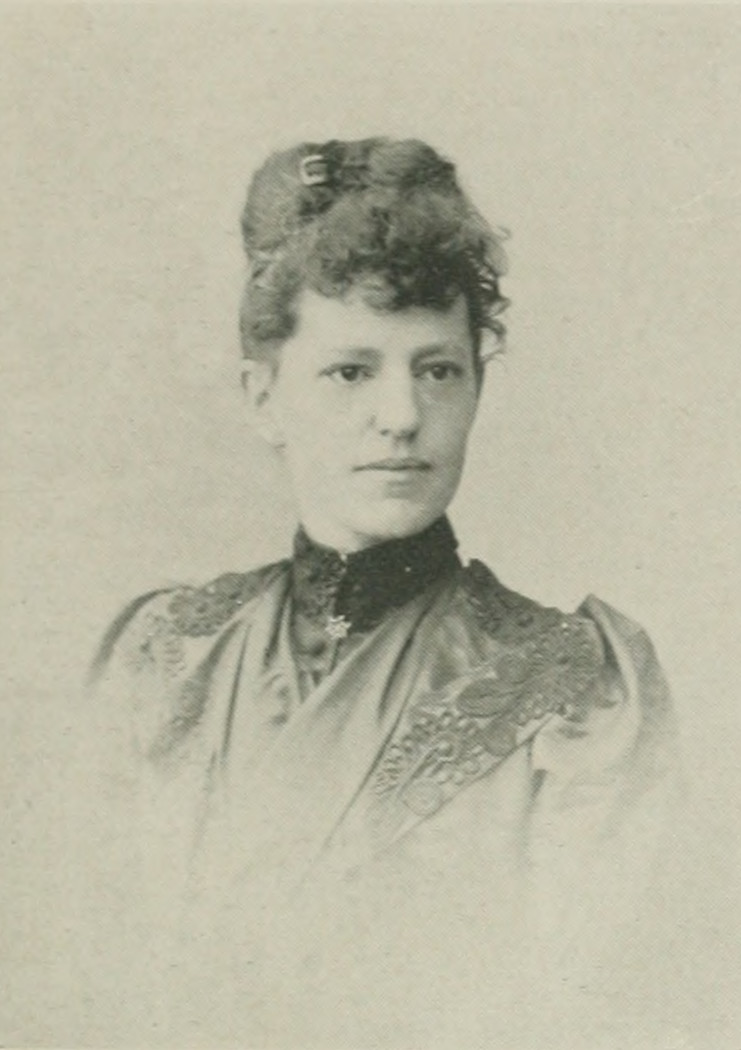
Blanche Dillaye

Her fondness was for black and white, and she was attracted toward etching as a specialty. Masters in this branch aided her and found an apt pupil. She took one lesson of Stephen Ferrier in the technique of etching. It seemed so simple that she unhesitatingly sent in her name as a contributor to an exhibition to be held in the Pennsylvania Academy of Fine Arts, and went so far as to order her frame. She knew little of the vicissitudes of the etcher, but she was on the way to learn, for, when the exhibition opened, her labor was represented only by an underbitten plate, an empty frame, the name in the catalogue of a never-finished etching, and the knowledge that etching represented patient labor as well as inspiration. The same year, Stephen Parrish came to her rescue, and by his counsel and assistance, enabled her to work with insight and certainty.

Dillaye's impressions were vivid and marked by a strong originality. In the rage for etchings that prevailed at the end of the 19th century, Dillaye never condescended to degrade the art to popular uses, but maintained that true painter-etcher's style which first brought her into notice. Dillaye was a contributor to the leading exhibitions in the US. At the Columbian Exposition, she represented the state of Pennsylvania in the judgment of etchings, and during the exposition's progress, a paper on her art was read by her before the Congress of Women, which attracted wide attention. Her etchings were also favorably received abroad, having been exhibited successfully in England and in the Paris Salon.

Dillaye had additional artistic ambitions. Her studio on South Penn Square, Philadelphia, showed talent in various other mediums. Her illustrations and manuscripts found their way into several leading magazines. She occupied many official positions in connection with art matters. She served as Vice-President of at least three organizations: Philadelphia Water Color Club, Fellowship of the Pennsylvania Academy of the Fine Arts, and The Plastic Club.

Dillaye died on December 20, 1931, in Philadelphia. The date of death of 1932 has also been mentioned, because she died towards the end of the year.

== Gallery ==
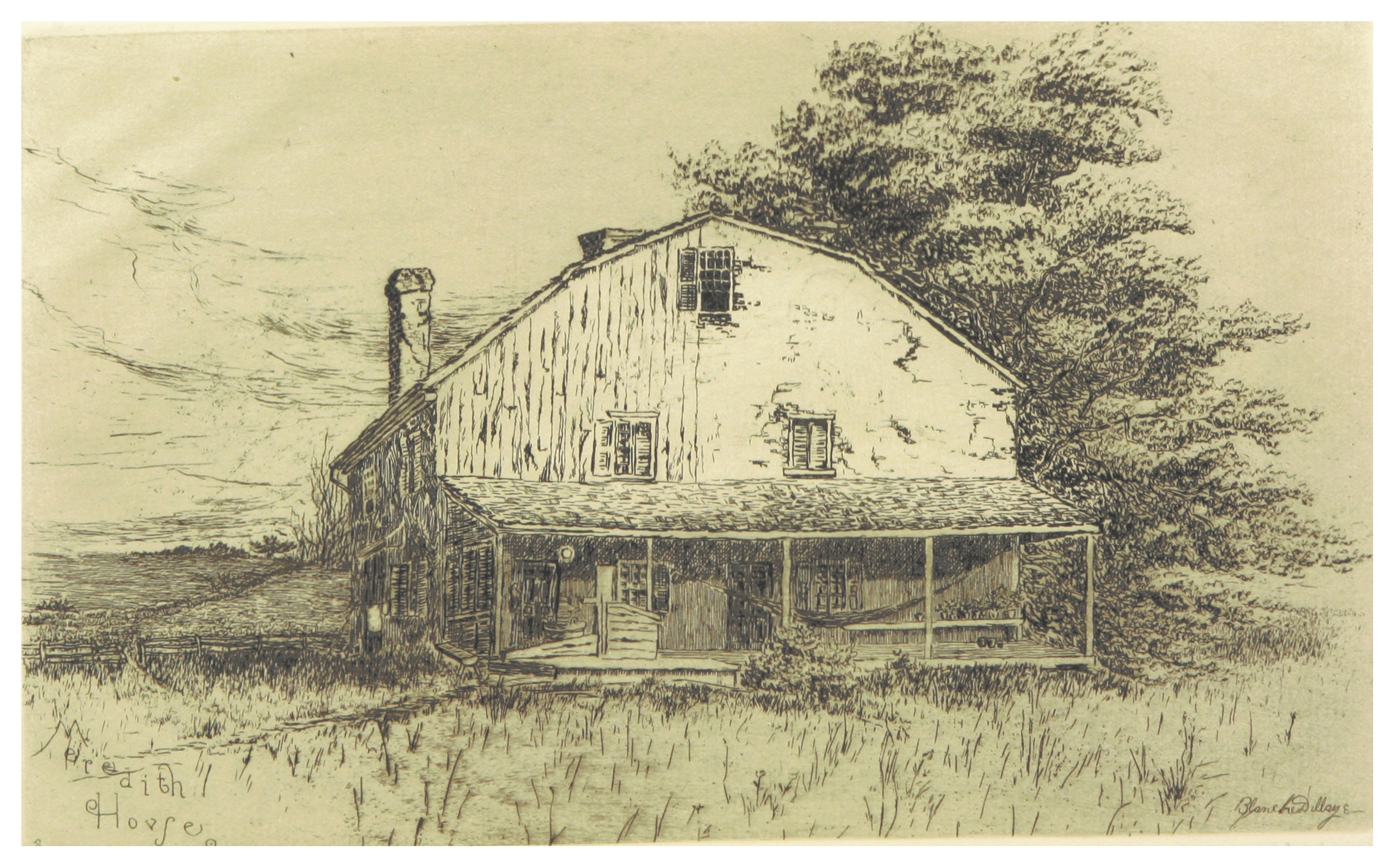
The Old House of Owen Evans

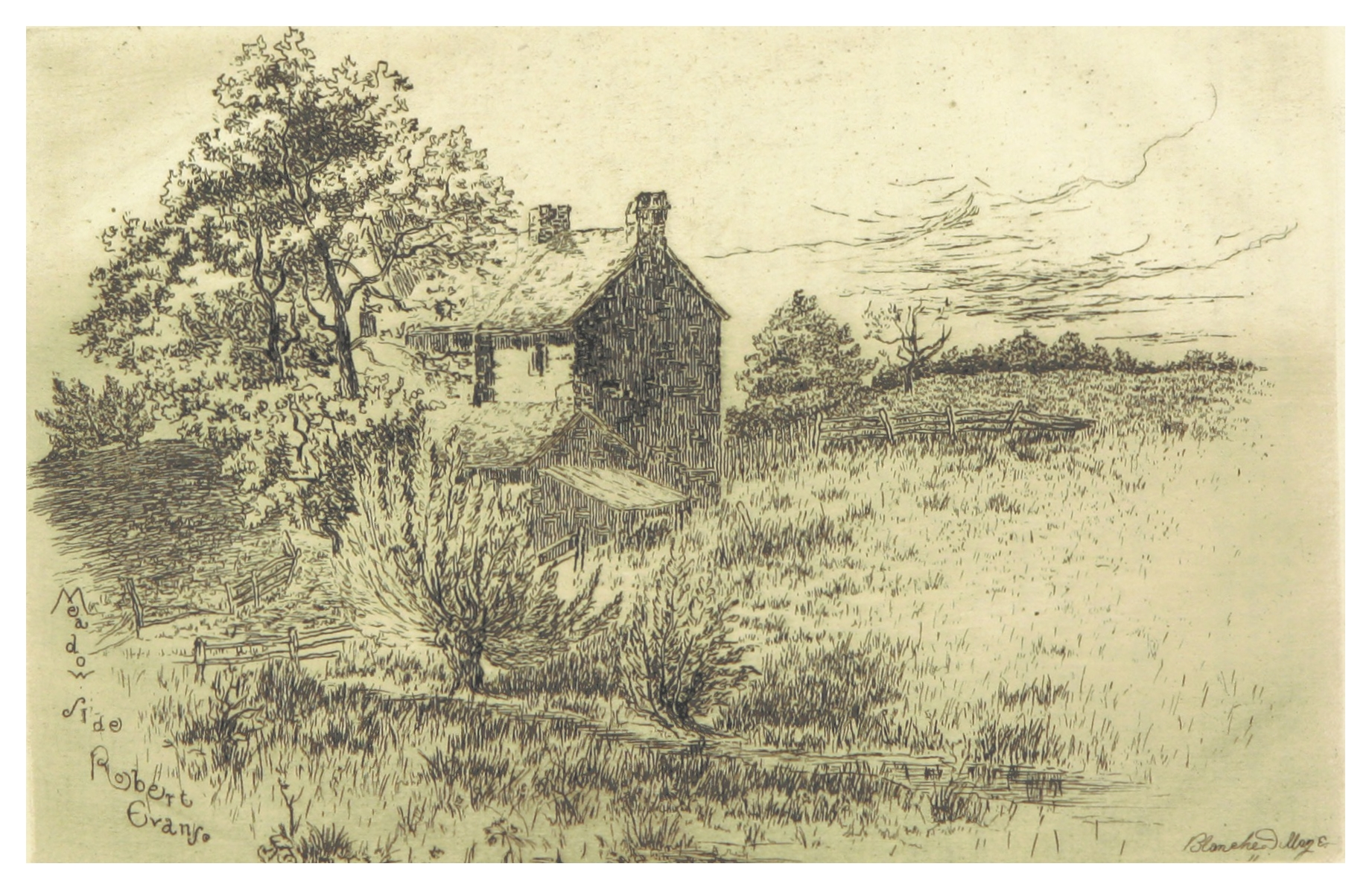
The Meadow Bank at Robert Evans's

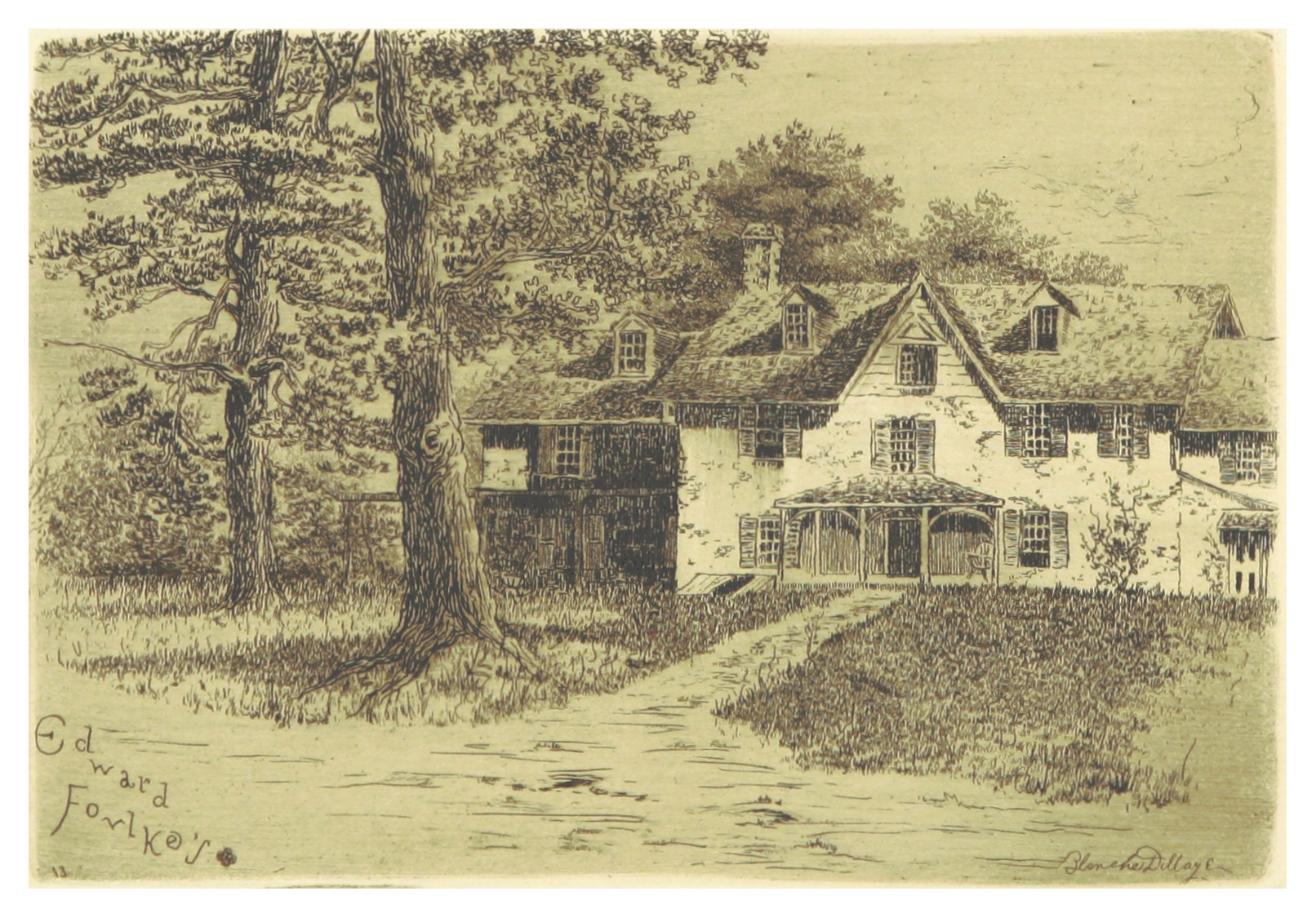
Present House on the Site of Edward Foulke's Original Dwelling

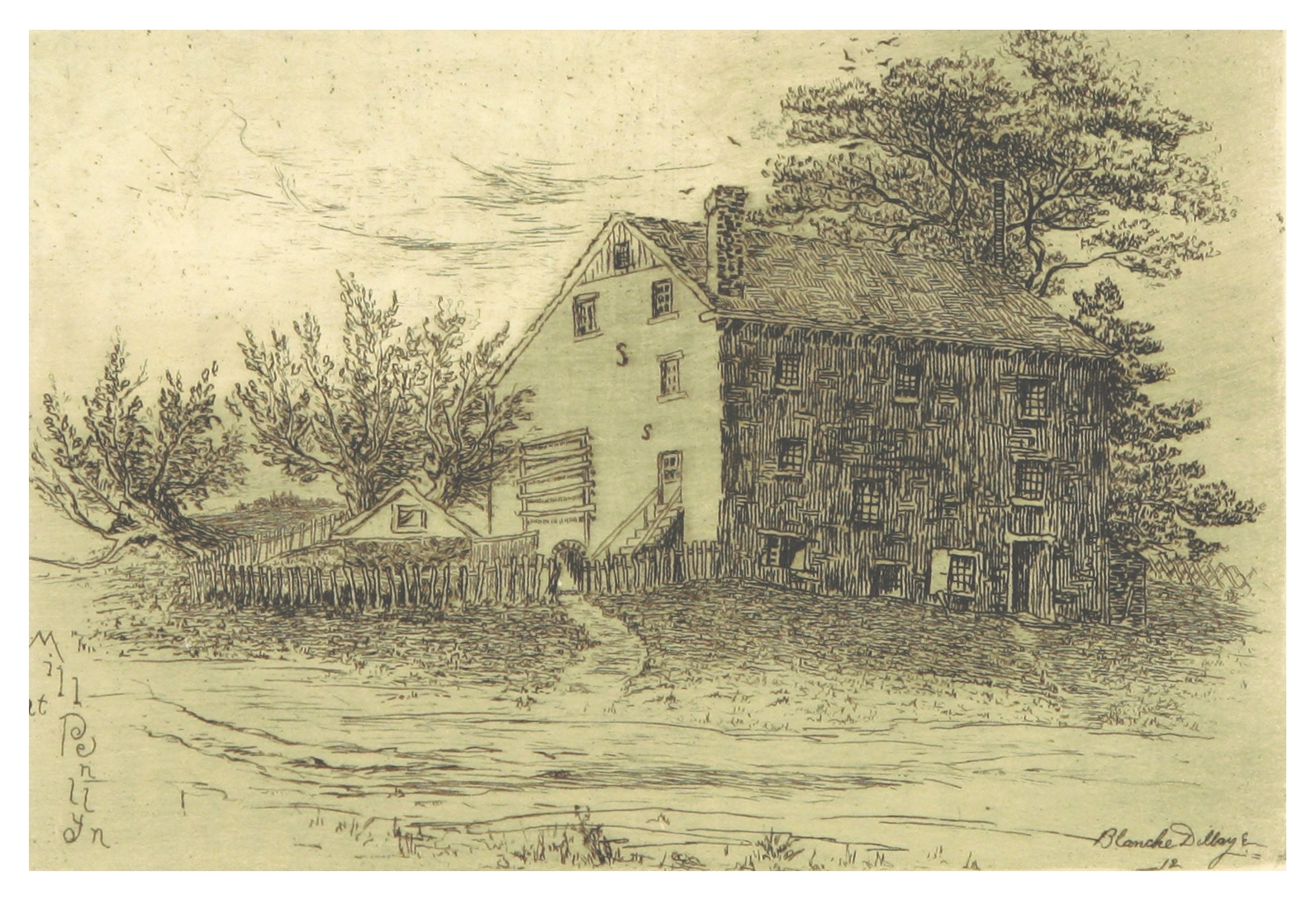
The Present Foulke Mill at Penllyn

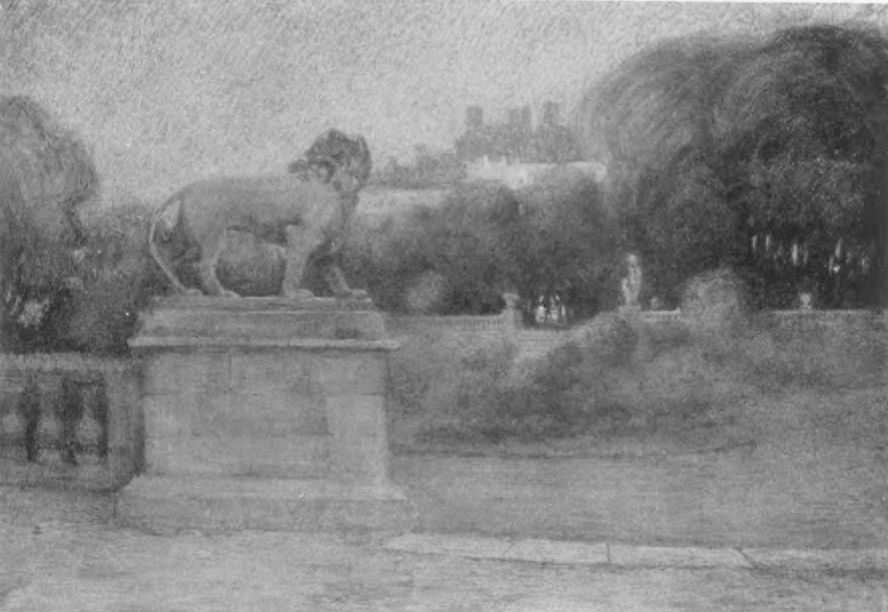
The Sentinel
