= William Sartain =

American artist (1843–1924)

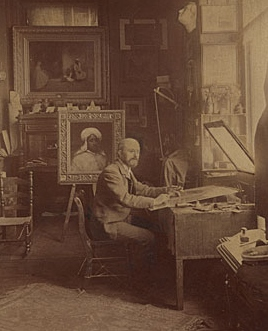
- William Sartain in his studio, circa 1900
- Born: November 21, 1843; Philadelphia
- Died: October 25, 1924 (aged 80); New York
- Education: Pennsylvania Academy of the Fine Arts
- Known for: Painter
- Movement: Orientalist

William Sartain (November 21, 1843 – October 25, 1924) was an American artist, known for the moody tonalism of his paintings, and interests and influences that spanned Orientalism and the Barbizon plein air approach to art. Friend to Thomas Eakins, son of artist John Sartain and brother to artist Emily Sartain, Sartain was one of the founders of the Society of American Artists and later became president of the New York Art Club.

== Life ==
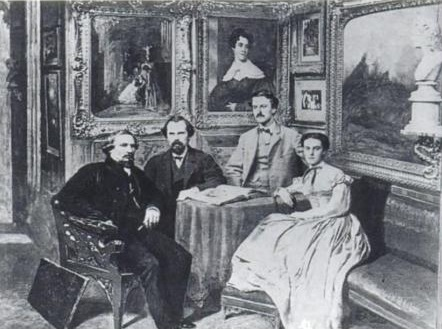
John Sartain & children, Henry, William & Emily (1868)

Sartain was born in Philadelphia on November 21, 1843, and his father was John Sartain. His sister, Emily Sartain, was also an artist, and eventually became the director of the Philadelphia School of Design for Women.

He attended Central High School (Philadelphia) and the Pennsylvania Academy of the Fine Arts with artists Thomas Eakins and Charles Lewis Fussell. Eakins and Sartain traveled together in 1868. He stayed in Paris until 1875, when he returned to Philadelphia, and moved to New York City.

He died at Post Graduate Hospital on October 25, 1924.

His work is in the Pennsylvania Academy of the Fine Arts, Philadelphia Museum of Art, Brooklyn Museum, U.S. Capitol, and National Museum of American Art.

== Gallery ==
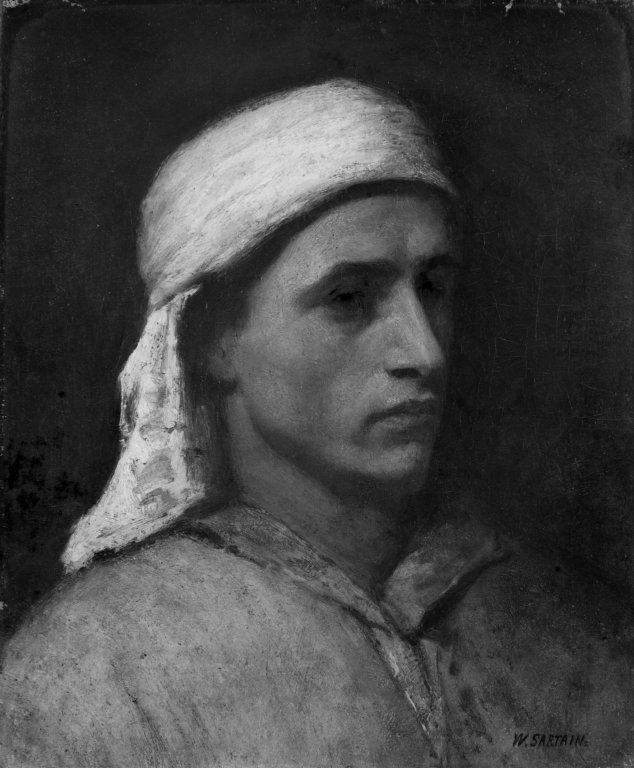
Arab Head (1880)

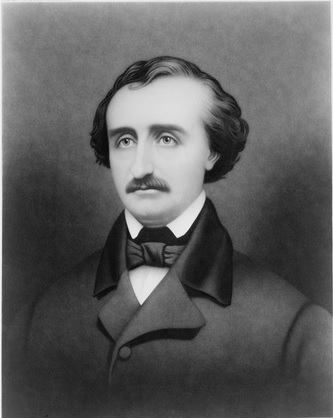
Edgar Allan Poe (1890-1900)

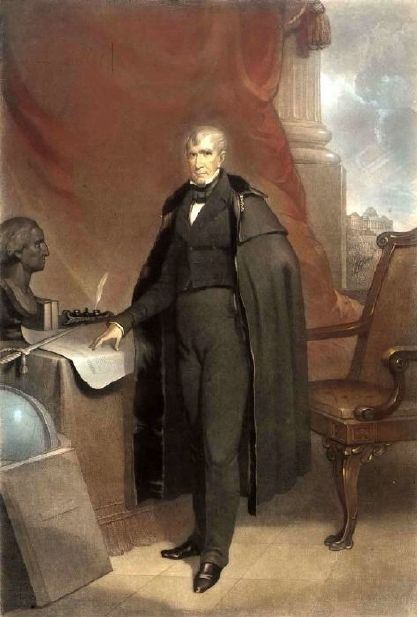
William Henry Harrison

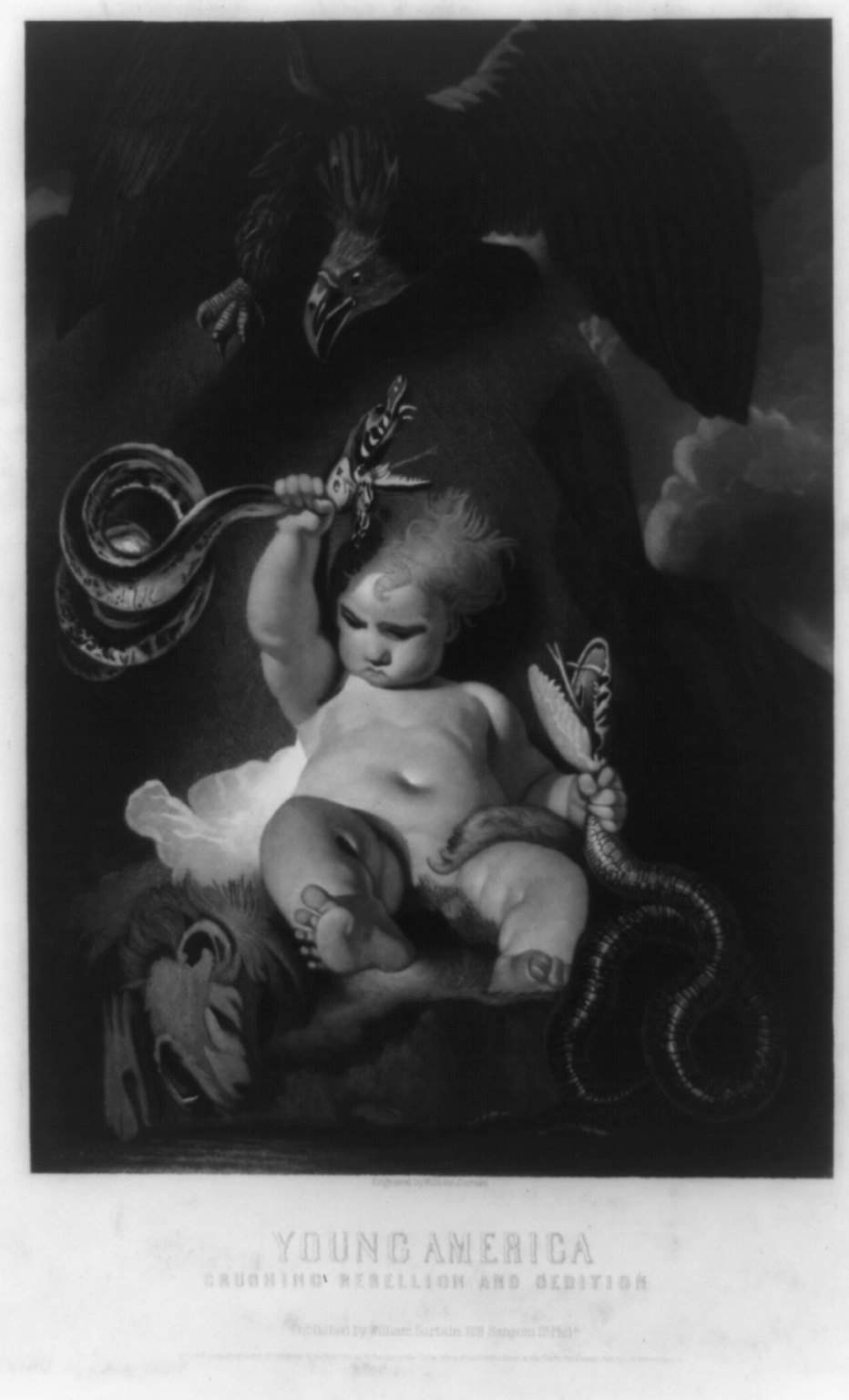
Young American crushing rebellion and sedition (1864)
