= Luxembourg at the 2026 European Athletics Championships =

- WA code: LUX
- National federation: Luxembourg Athletics Federation
- Website: www.fla.lu

in Birmingham, United Kingdom
- Competitors: 3 (1 man and 2 women)
- Medals Ranked =22nd: Gold 0 Silver 1 Bronze 0 Total 1

European Athletics Championships appearances (overview)
- 1934; 1938; 1946; 1950; 1954; 1958; 1962; 1966; 1969; 1971; 1974; 1978; 1982; 1986; 1990; 1994; 1998–2002; 2006; 2010; 2012; 2014; 2016; 2018; 2022; 2024; 2026

Luxembourg competed at the 2026 European Athletics Championships in Birmingham, United Kingdom, between 10 and 16 August 2026. Three athletes (two female and one male) were sent to represent the country.

== Medals ==
Medal	Name	Event	Date
Silver	Ruben Querinjean	Men's 3000 metres steeplechase	16 August

== Results ==
The following athletes are selected to compete by the Luxembourg Athletics Federation.

- including alternates

Key

- Note–Ranks given for track events are within the athlete's heat only
- Q = Qualified by place in Track Events or by standard in Field Events
- q = Qualified by time in Track Events or without standard in Field Events
- qR= Advanced to the next round by referee.
- NR = National record
- CHB = Championship best
- WL = World Leading
- PB = Personal best
- SB = Season's best
- — = Round not applicable for the event
- Bye = Athlete not required to compete in round
- DNF = Did Not Finish (Running or Race Walking Events)
- DNS = Did not start
- DQ = Disqualified
- NM = No Mark (No valid trial recorded in Field Events

Track and road events

Athlete	Event	Heat		Semifinal		Final	
Athlete	Event	Result	Rank	Result	Rank	Result	Rank
Ruben Querinjean	Men's 3000 m steeplechase	8:35.07	4 Q	—N/a		8:25.61	2nd place, silver medalist(s)
Patrizia Van der Weken	Women's 100 m	Bye		11.08	2 Q	11.10	6
Vera Bertemes-Hoffmann	Women's 1500 m	4:14.63	14	—N/a		Did not advance	
Vera Bertemes-Hoffmann	Women's 5000 m	—N/a				16:38.90	22
