= Luxembourg at the European Athletics Championships =

- Flag of Luxembourg
- WA code: LUX
- National federation: Fédération Luxembourgeoise d'Athlétisme
- Website: www.fla.lu
- Medals Ranked joint 42nd: Gold 0 Silver 2 Bronze 0 Total 2

European Athletics Championships appearances (overview)
- 1934; 1938; 1946; 1950; 1954; 1958; 1962; 1966; 1969; 1971; 1974; 1978; 1982; 1986; 1990; 1994; 1998–2002; 2006; 2010; 2012; 2014; 2016; 2018; 2022; 2024; 2026

These are the results of the Luxembourg athletes at the European Athletics Championships. As of 2026, Luxembourg has won 2 silver medals at the European Athletics Championships

== List of medalists ==
=== Men ===
Medal	Athlete	Championship	Discipline
Silver	David Fiegen	2006 Gothenburg	Men's 800 metres
Silver	Ruben Querinjean	2026 Birmingham	3000 metres steeplechase
