= Luxembourg at the 2022 European Athletics Championships =

- Flag of Luxembourg
- WA code: LUX
- National federation: Luxembourg Athletics Federation

in Munich, Germany 15 August 2022 – 21 August 2022
- Competitors: 4 (2 men and 2 women) in 4 events
- Medals: Gold 0 Silver 0 Bronze 0 Total 0

European Athletics Championships appearances (overview)
- 1934; 1938; 1946; 1950; 1954; 1958; 1962; 1966; 1969; 1971; 1974; 1978; 1982; 1986; 1990; 1994; 1998–2002; 2006; 2010; 2012; 2014; 2016; 2018; 2022; 2024

Luxembourg competed at the 2022 European Athletics Championships in Munich, Germany, between 15 and 21 August 2022

== Results ==
Luxembourg entered the following athletes.

Key

- Q = Qualified for the next round
- q = Qualified for the next round as a fastest loser or, in field events, by position without achieving the qualifying target
- NR = National record
- PB = Personal best
- SB = Season best
- N/A = Round not applicable for the event

=== Men ===
Track and road events

Athlete	Event	Heat		Semifinal		Final	
Athlete	Event	Result	Rank	Result	Rank	Result	Rank
Charles Grethen	1500 m	3:40.33	16	—		Did not advance	

Field events

Athlete	Event	Qualification		Final	
Athlete	Event	Distance	Position	Distance	Position
Bob Bertemes	Shot put	19.77	14	Did not advance	

=== Women ===
Track and road events

Athlete	Event	Heat		Semifinal		Final	
Athlete	Event	Result	Rank	Result	Rank	Result	Rank
Patrizia van der Weken	100 m	11.46	9 Q	11.51	17	Did not advance	
Victoria Rausch	100 m hurdles	13.37	11 q	13.33	20	Did not advance	
