= Luxembourg at the 1978 European Athletics Championships =

- WA code: LUX

in Prague
- Competitors: 2
- Medals: Gold 0 Silver 0 Bronze 0 Total 0

European Athletics Championships appearances (overview)
- 1934; 1938; 1946; 1950; 1954; 1958; 1962; 1966; 1969; 1971; 1974; 1978; 1982; 1986; 1990; 1994; 1998–2002; 2006; 2010; 2012; 2014; 2016; 2018; 2022; 2024; 2026

Luxembourg sent two athletes to the 1978 European Athletics Championships which took place 29 August–3 September 1978 in Prague. Luxembourg won no medals at the Championships.
