= Luxembourg at the 2018 European Athletics Championships =

- WA code: LUX
- National federation: FLA
- Website: www.fla.lu

in Berlin
- Competitors: 3

European Athletics Championships appearances (overview)
- 1934; 1938; 1946; 1950; 1954; 1958; 1962; 1966; 1969; 1971; 1974; 1978; 1982; 1986; 1990; 1994; 1998–2002; 2006; 2010; 2012; 2014; 2016; 2018; 2022; 2024

Luxembourg competed at the 2018 European Athletics Championships in Berlin, Germany, from 6–12 August 2018. A delegation of 3 athletes were sent to represent the country.

The following athletes were selected to compete by the Luxembourg Athletics Federation.

Men
Track and road

Athletes	Event	Heats		Semifinal		Final	
Athletes	Event	Result	Rank	Result	Rank	Result	Rank
Charles Grethen	800 metres						

Field events

Athletes	Event	Qualification		Final	
Athletes	Event	Distance	Position	Distance	Position
Bob Bertemes	Shot put	19.70 m	12 (q)	21.00 m	6 (NR)

Women
Track and road

Athletes	Event	Heats		Semifinal		Final	
Athletes	Event	Result	Rank	Result	Rank	Result	Rank
Charline Mathias	800 metres	2:02.08	10 (Q)	2:02.01	8	did not advance	
