= Stéphanie Empain =

Luxembourgish politician

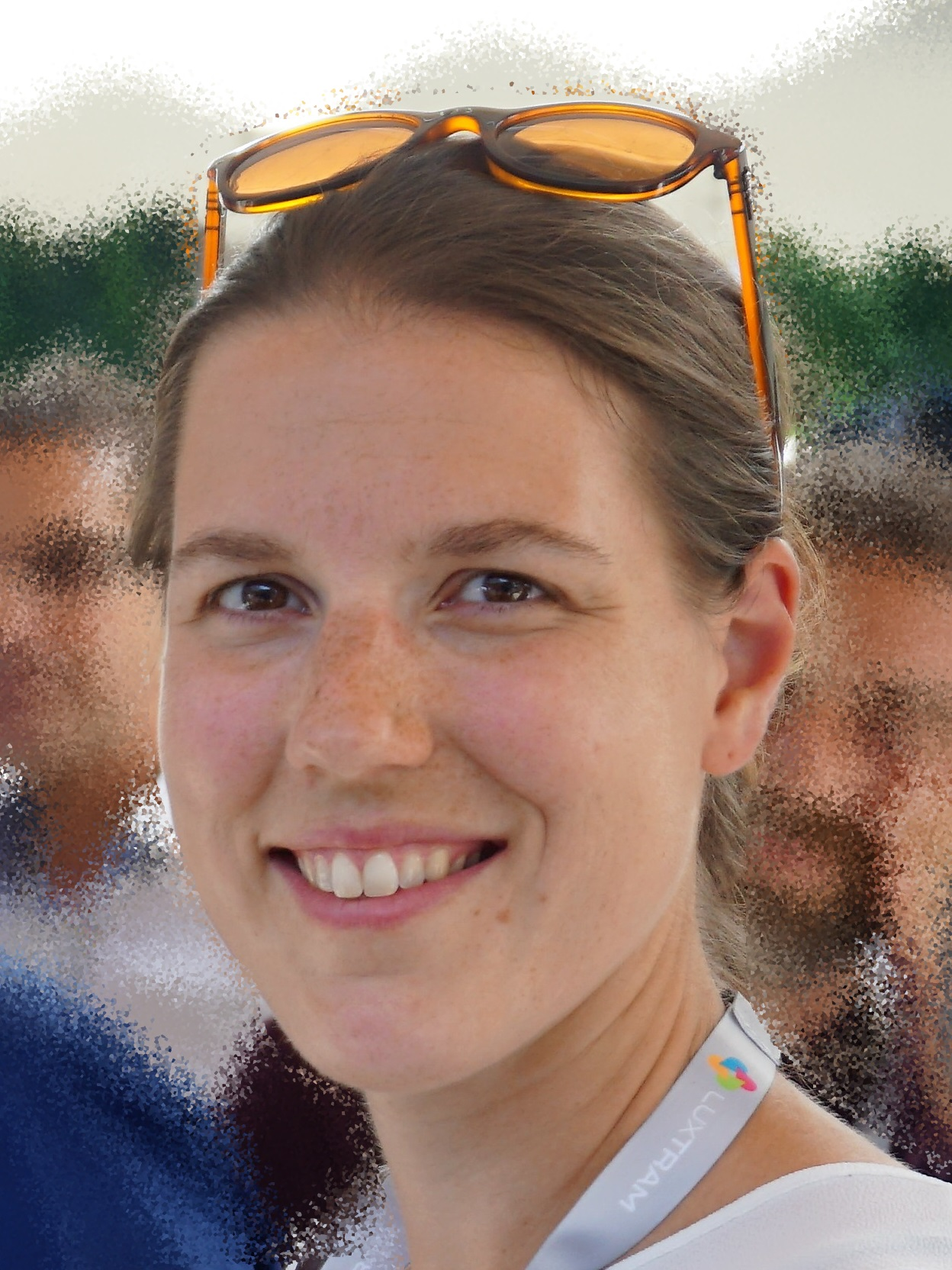

Chairwoman of the Luxembourg Athletics Federation

Personal details
- Born: 11 August 1983
- Political party: The Greens

Stéphanie Empain (born 11 August 1983 in Luxembourg City) is a Luxembourgish politician of The Greens party.

== Biography ==
=== Studies and professional career ===
She studied political science and obtained a Master of Arts degree. She served in the general staff of the Luxembourg Army for two years, then she worked as the head of the Éislek regional tourism office for six years.

In 2015, she founded a company that produces reusable nappies for infants.

On 1 December 2018 she succeeded Claude Haagen as the chairwoman of the Luxembourg Athletics Federation.

=== Political activity ===
Empain was active within the youth section of The Greens party for several years. She stood in the 2018 general election after Françoise Folmer resigned from the co-chairwomanship of the party. Following the election, Claude Turmes became the Minister of Planning and Energy within the Bettel II Government and was replaced by Empain as one of the deputies of the Nord constituency.

=== Private life ===
Empain is a married mother of two and resides in Erpeldange.
