= Folmer =

Folmer is a surname. Notable people with the surname include:

- Françoise Folmer (born 1961), Luxembourgish architect and politician
- Joke Folmer (1923–2022), Dutch resistance member
- Kirill Folmer (born 2000), Russian footballer
- Louis H. Folmer (1904–1983), American politician
- Mike Folmer (born 1956), American politician and convicted sex offender
- Richard Folmer (1942–2022), American actor

== See also ==
- Follmer
