= List of athletics clubs in Luxembourg =

This is a list of athletics clubs in Luxembourg. It includes only clubs that compete at track and field and that are affiliated to the Luxembourg Athletics Federation, the governing body for athletics in Luxembourg.

== List of clubs ==
- CA Belvaux, Belvaux
- CS Nord Clervaux, Clervaux
- Celtic Diekirch, Diekirch
- CA Dudelange, Dudelange
- Road Runners Echternach, Echternach
- CA Fola Esch, Esch-sur-Alzette
- CAPA Ettelbruck, Ettelbruck
- CA Est Grevenmacher, Grevenmacher
- CAL Spora Luxembourg, Luxembourg City
- CA Schifflange, Schifflange
- RBUA Pétange, Pétange
- Lafclub Walfer Huesen, Bereldange
