= Luxembourg at the 2024 European Athletics Championships =

- Flag of Luxembourg
- WA code: LUX

in Rome, Italy 7 June 2024 – 12 June 2022
- Competitors: 5 (2 men and 3 women)

European Athletics Championships appearances (overview)
- 1934; 1938; 1946; 1950; 1954; 1958; 1962; 1966; 1969; 1971; 1974; 1978; 1982; 1986; 1990; 1994; 1998–2002; 2006; 2010; 2012; 2014; 2016; 2018; 2022; 2024

Luxembourg competed at the 2024 European Athletics Championships in Rome, Italy from 7–12 June 2024.

== Results ==
Luxembourg entered the following athletes.

Key

- Q = Qualified for the next round
- q = Qualified for the next round as a fastest loser or, in field events, by position without achieving the qualifying target
- NR = National record
- PB = Personal best
- SB = Season best
- N/A = Round not applicable for the event

=== Men ===
Track and road events

Athlete	Event	Heat		Semifinal		Final	
Athlete	Event	Result	Rank	Result	Rank	Result	Rank
Ruben Querinjean	3000 metres steeplechase	8:29.07	11	Did not advance			

Field events

Athlete	Event	Qualification		Final	
Athlete	Event	Distance	Position	Distance	Position
Bob Bertemes	Shot put	20.23	7 q	20.86	6

=== Women ===
Track and road events

Athlete	Event	Heat		Semifinal		Final	
Athlete	Event	Result	Rank	Result	Rank	Result	Rank
Patrizia van der Weken	100 metres	Bye		11.00 NR	2 Q	11.04	4
Charline Mathias	800 metres	2:02.65	20 Q	2:00.78 SB	12	Did not advance	
Vera Hoffmann	1500 metres	4:10.53	8	—		Did not advance	
