= Mary Smith Prize =

- Description: Award for the best work by a Philadelphia woman artist
- Country: United States
- Presented by: Pennsylvania Academy of the Fine Arts (PAFA)
- Status: Defunct

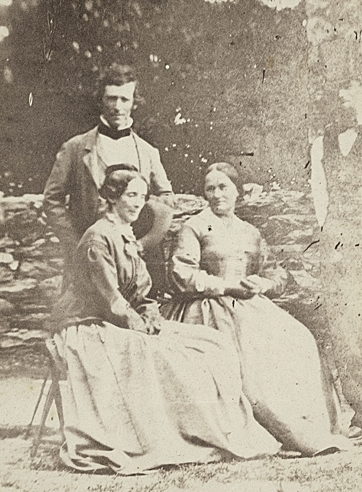
Russell, Mary Priscilla, and Mary Smith

The Mary Smith Prize (defunct) was a prestigious art prize awarded to women artists by the Pennsylvania Academy of the Fine Arts. It recognized the best work by a Philadelphia woman artist at PAFA's annual exhibition — one that showed "the most originality of subject, beauty of design and drawing, and finesse of color and skill of execution". The prize was founded in 1879 by Russell Smith in memory of his deceased daughter, artist Mary Russell Smith. It was awarded from 1879 to 1968.

== Prize ==
In the nineteenth century, women artists were rarely awarded major prizes. They were mostly limited to prizes designated for them. But rare exceptions included: Anna Elizabeth Klumpke, who won the 1889 Temple Gold Medal at PAFA; Mary Hazelton, who won the 1896 Hallgarten Prize at the National Academy of Design; and Cecilia Beaux, who won the 1899 Carnegie Prize at the Carnegie Museum of Art and the 1900 Temple Gold Medal at PAFA.

Initially, the Mary Smith Prize carried a cash prize of $100, which was increased to $300 in 1960. Cecilia Beaux had won this prize four times before she was awarded the Temple Gold Medal.

Other 19th-century prizes for women artists were the Dodge Prize at the National Academy of Design and the Shaw Prize at the Society of American Artists.

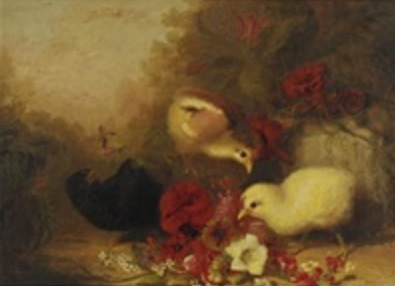
Mary Russell Smith (1842–1878), Springs Bounty.

== Mary Russell Smith ==
Mary Russell Smith was the daughter of landscape and theatrical scenery painter William Thompson Russell Smith (Russell Smith) (1812–96) and amateur artist Mary Priscilla Wilson Smith (1819–74). Both of her parents exhibited at the Pennsylvania Academy of the Fine Arts. Mary and her brother, Xanthus Russell Smith, both developed an interest in painting. Xanthus attended the Pennsylvania Academy of the Fine Arts and Mary exhibited her paintings of rabbits, chicks, and other animals there 1859 to 1869, and again between 1876 and 1878.

Russell Smith established the Mary Smith Prize following her death. Mary Russell Smith had designated that upon her death the proceeds of the sale of her paintings should be used to fund the prize, to be awarded to women artists.

== Recipients ==
Year	Artist	Image	Work	Collection	Notes
1879	Susan Macdowell Eakins		Portrait of a Gentleman and Dog	Taubman Museum of Art, Roanoke, Virginia	Portrait of the artist's father.
1880	Catherine A. Janvier		Old-Fashioned Music (The Guitar Player)	Private collection	
1881	Emily Sartain		Marie		
1882	Mary K. Trotter		May		
1883	Emily Sartain		Metelill		
1884	Lucy D. Holme		Petrona		
1885	Cecilia Beaux		Les Derniers Jours d'Enfance (The Last Days of Infancy)	Pennsylvania Academy of the Fine Arts	Portrait of the artist's sister, Etta Beaux Drinker, and nephew Henry. Exhibited: 1887 Paris Salon
1886	No exhibition				
1887	Cecilia Beaux		A Little Girl (Fanny Travis Cochran)	Pennsylvania Academy of the Fine Arts	
1888	Elizabeth F. Bonsall		Paying the Model		
1889	Elizabeth Wentworth Roberts (Note: In 1902, Elizabeth Wentworth Roberts, the 1889 recipient of the Mary Smith Prize, founded the Jennie Sesnan Gold Medal at the Pennsylvania Academy of the Fine Arts.)		Die Flucht (The Flight)		
1890	Alice Barber Stephens		Portrait of a Boy		
1891	Cecilia Beaux		Portrait (pastel)		
1892	Cecilia Beaux		Portrait		
1893	No exhibition				
1894	Maria L. Kirk		Portrait		
1895	Gabrielle D. Clements		Granite Cutting at Cape Ann		
1896	Elizabeth H. Watson		Portrait of Reverend Dr. Watson		
1897	Elizabeth F. Bonsall		Hot Milk	Pennsylvania Academy of the Fine Arts	
1898	Caroline Peart		Once upon a Time	Phillips Museum of Art, Franklin & Marshall College	
1899	Carol H. Beck		Study		Following the artist's death in 1908, the Carol H. Beck Gold Medal was founded in her memory.
1900	Mary F. R. Clay		Portrait of Irene K.		Honorable mention: Janet Wheeler
1901	Janet Wheeler		Portrait of Mrs. Louise Starr		
1902	Elinor Earle		Fire Light		
1903	Jessie Willcox Smith		A Mother's Days (set of 8 watercolor illustrations)		Published in Scribner's Monthly Magazine, December 1902.
1904	Lillian M. Genth		Peasant Houses		
1905	Elizabeth Shippen Green		set of 12 watercolor illustrations for "The Thousand Quilt" (short story)		Annie Hamilton Donnell, "The Thousand Quilt,"; Harper's Monthly Magazine, December 1904.
1906	Alice Mumford Roberts		Two Vaudeville Stars		
1907	Mary Smyth Perkins		Cows		
1908	Elizabeth Sparhawk-Jones		Roller Skates		
1909	Martha Walter		Portrait		
1910	Alice Mumford Roberts		The Morning Air		
1911	Alice Kent Stoddard		Portrait of Elizabeth Sparhawk-Jones	Pennsylvania Academy of the Fine Arts	
1912	Elizabeth Sparhawk-Jones		In the Spring	Des Moines Art Center, Iowa	
1913	Alice Kent Stoddard		Little Girl Cutting Dolls		
1914	Nina B. Ward		Elizabeth	Pennsylvania Academy of the Fine Arts	
1915	Gertrude A. Lambert		Carpet Rags		
1916	Nancy M. Ferguson		In Provincetown		
1917	Elizabeth F. Washington		Winter		
1918	Helen K. McCarthy		Farms in Hill Country		
1919	Juliet White Gross		On the Hill		
1920	Mildred B. Miller		In the Window		
1921	Katherine Patton		Deep in the Woods		
1922	Mary Townsend Mason		Still Life with Fruit		
1923	Isabel Branson Cartwright		Portrait: H.B.S.		
1924	Lillian B. Meeser		The Green Bottle		
1925	Mary Butler		Flood Tide		
1926	Wenonah Bell		Still Life		
1927	Pearl Aiman Van Sciver		New Hope		
1928	Laura D. S. Ladd		Still Life and Dahlias		
1929	Edith McMurtrie		Harpooning Horse Mackerel		
1930	Grace Gemberling		Rocks and Flowers		
1931	Mildred B. Miller		Yuanshi Kuo		
1932	Virginia Armitage McCall		Waldron Academy, Overbrook		
1933	Catherine Morris Wright		After Lunch		
1934	Elizabeth F. Washington		The Bend in the Creek		
1935	Margaretta S. Hinchman		Portrait of a Nun		
1936	Alice T. Roberts		T'Ang Horses		
1937	Henriette Wyeth		Peter Hurd	El Paso Museum of Art	
1938	Irene Denney		The "5 and 10"		
1939	Mary Townsend Mason		Flowers		
1940	Frances Cowan		Wetzel's Kitchen		
1941	Sarah Blakeslee		Along the River		
1942	Faye Swengel		Bucks County Farmer		
1943	Margaretta S. Hinchman		I Know the Lord Laid His Hand on Me		
1944	Doris Kunzie Weidner		Holliday's Mill		
1945	Catherine Grant		Captain Charlie and the Hawk's Nest		
1946	Doris Kunzie Weidner		Deserted Farm		
1947	Agnes Allen		Portrait of J. Somers Smith	The State in Schuylkill, Philadelphia	
1948	Violet Oakley		Christ and the Woman of Samaria	First Presbyterian Church in Germantown, Philadelphia, Pennsylvania	
1949	Catherine Grant		The Villa Marie		
1950	Marie-Celeste Fadden		French Child on Train		
1951	Rita Wolpe Barnett		To the Earth		
1952	Alice T. Roberts		Ipswich Sand Dunes, No. 2		
1953	Elsie Manville		Yellow Hat		
1954	Dora Bortin		Russian Tea Service		
1955	No exhibition				
1956	No prize awarded				
1957	No exhibition				
1958	Jane Sperry Eisenstat		Dead Opossum		
1959	No exhibition				
1960	Cecilia Finberg		Landscape		
1961	No exhibition				
1962	Elizabeth C. Osborne		Girl Sleeping		
1963	No exhibition				
1964	Virginia Armitage McCall		Dahlia: Still Life		
1965	No exhibition				
1966	Mitzi Melnicoff		Children's Hour		
1967	No exhibition				
1968	Edna Andrade		Space Frame D		Last Mary Smith Prize awarded

== See also ==
- Beck Gold Medal
- Temple Gold Medal
- Widener Gold Medal
