= Van Sciver =

Van Sciver is a surname. It may refer to:

- Ethan Van Sciver (born 1974), American comics artist
- Noah Van Sciver (born 1984), American cartoonist
- Pearl Van Sciver (1896–1966), American artist

== See also ==
- Natalie Sciver (born 1992), British cricketer
