= Follmer =

Follmer or Föllmer is a surname. Notable people with this surname include:

- Brad Follmer, character in The X-Files
- Clive Follmer (1931–2016), American basketball player
- Cy Follmer (1933–2009), American broadcaster
- Follmer, founder of Follmer, Clogg and Company Umbrella Factory
- Frederick Voris Follmer (1885–1971), American judge
- George Follmer (born 1934), American racing driver
- Hans Föllmer (born 1941), German mathematician
- Karl-Heinz Follmer, member of The Scorpions

== See also ==
- Folmer
