= Elizabeth Washington =

Elizabeth Washington may refer to:

- Elizabeth Washington Lewis (1733–1797), younger sister of George Washington
- Elizabeth F. Washington (1871–1953), American portrait and landscape painter
