= William Thompson Russell Smith =

American painter

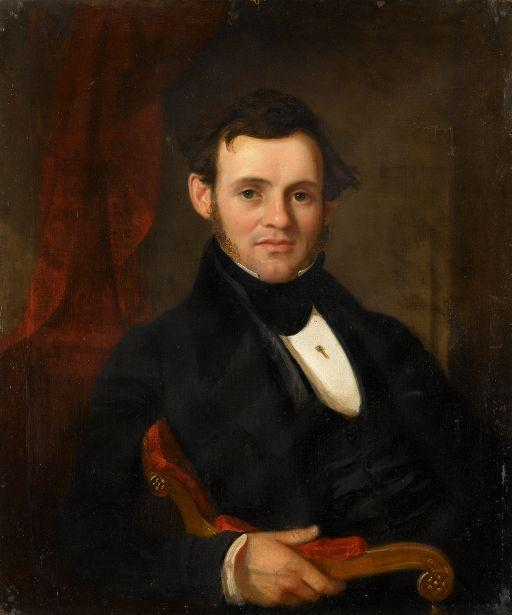
Portrait of William T. Russell Smith by John F. Francis (private collection)

William Thompson Russell Smith (Glasgow, Scotland 1812 – Glenside, PA, 1896) was a Scottish-American painter who produced iconic images of Pennsylvania's landscape inspired by the aesthetic of the Hudson River School.

== Early life and education ==
Born in Glasgow, Scotland, Smith was brought to the United States in 1819 by his parents, who lived in western Pennsylvania and settled in Pittsburgh. Here, between 1828 and 1831, he studied art under the portraitist James Lambdin, a former pupil of Thomas Sully.

== Career ==
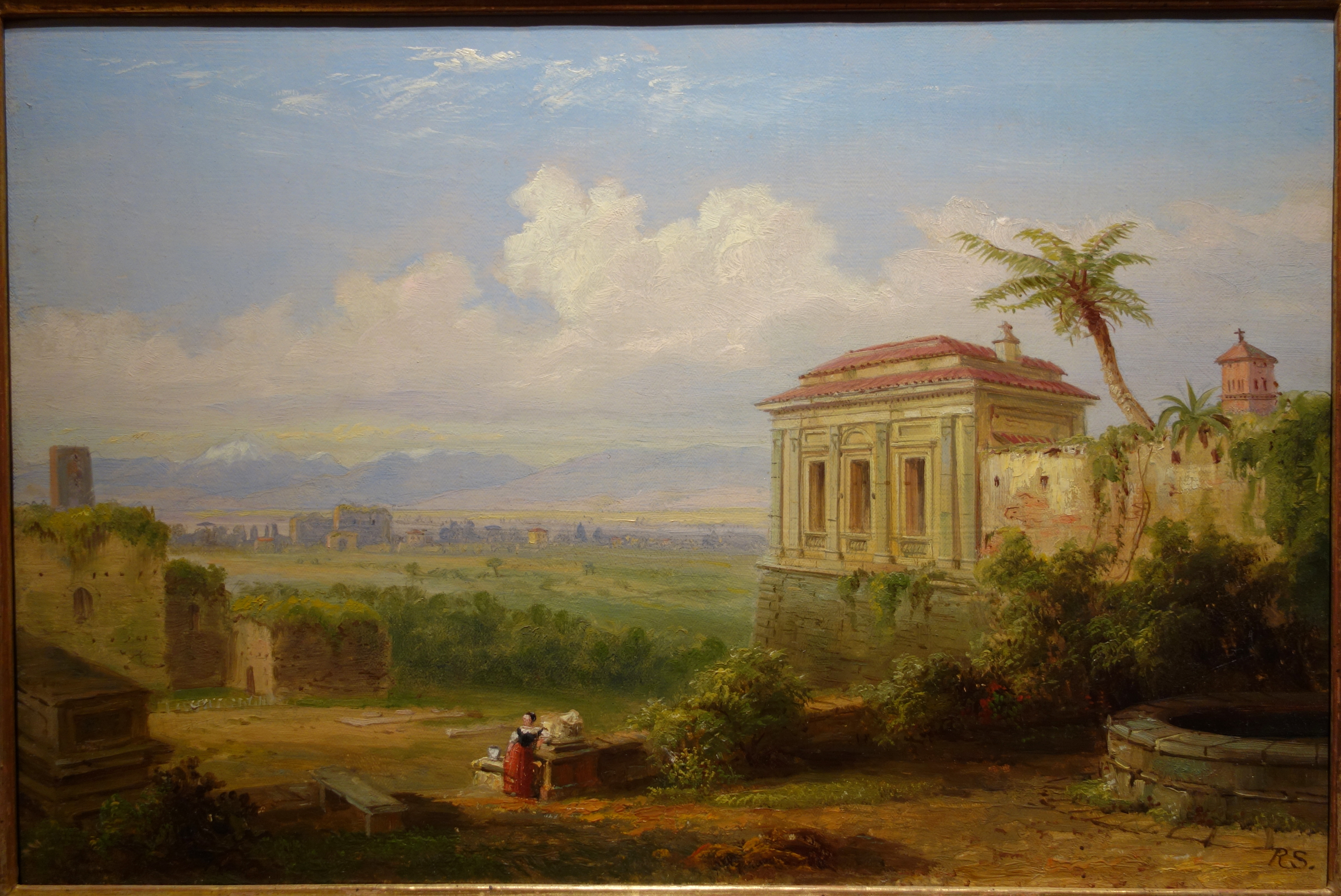
The Baths of Titus, Monte Cavi from the Palatine, Rome (c. 1851–52), New Britain Museum of American Art, Connecticut.

Smith also served as curator of Lambdin's Pittsburgh Museum, where he met many of the city's scientists and intellectuals. At the beginning of his career, Smith found considerable success in painting commercial signs and backgrounds for theatrical productions.

In 1835, he moved to Philadelphia in order to paint decorations for the Walnut Street Theater. During this time that he began to write poetry and produced smaller-scale landscape paintings that were inspired by his theatrical scenery. These works were displayed in public exhibitions, including the Artists' Fund Society and the Pennsylvania Academy of the Fine Arts in Philadelphia, where he regularly contributed to the annual exhibitions until 1889. In 1858, he was honored with a commission by the Philadelphia Academy of Music to paint their scenery. Smith traveled throughout Pennsylvania, Virginia, and New England to observe nature and drawing sketches for later works, showing extraordinary talent in painting atmosphere, water, and other elements of nature. He became friend of Rembrandt Peale, who published a very favorable article on the artist in the Gazette of the United States, and he was steadily patronized by Philadelphia's conservative social elite.

== Marriage and children ==
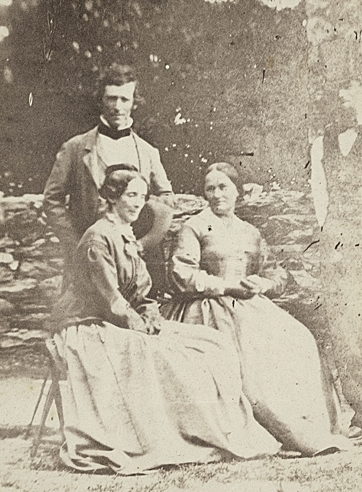
Russell, Mary Priscilla, and Mary Smith

In 1838, Smith married Mary Priscilla Wilson, who was also a painter. Mary Priscilla and Russell had two children, Xanthus Russell Smith in 1839 and Mary Russell Smith in 1842, who became painters as well. Russell encouraged his children to practice painting when he took the whole family to Europe from 1851 to 1852 for a tour of artistic landmarks. Xanthus was a skilled painter of landscape and marine subjects. Mary was well known for her paintings of animals, which she began producing at the age of fourteen. In 1876, both father and daughter exhibited their works at the Philadelphia Centennial Exposition. Mary produced and sold her paintings until her early death in 1878 at the age of thirty-six. The death of his daughter had a profound effect on Smith, who established the Mary Smith Prize in her name at the Pennsylvania Academy of the Fine Arts, where he was a board member. Smith spent his last years at Edgehill in Glenside, Pennsylvania, living happily with his son's family. He died on November 8, 1896, and was buried at Ivy Hill Cemetery in Philadelphia.

== Collections ==
Russell Smith's works are held in the collections of the Addison Gallery of American Art, the Berkshire Museum, Butler Institute of American Art, Carnegie Institute, Cheekwood Botanical Garden and Museum of Art, Delaware Art Museum, Fort Ligonier, Morris Museum of Art, Pennsylvania Academy of the Fine Arts, Sewell C. Biggs Museum of American Art, Wadsworth Atheneum, Westmoreland Museum of American Art.
