= Xanthus Russell Smith =

War artist (1839–1929)

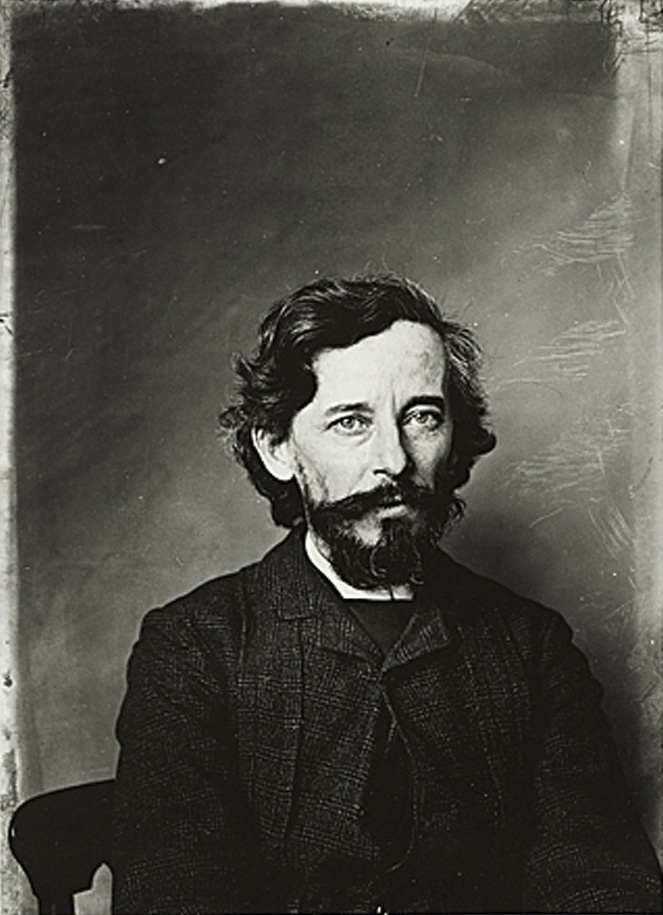
- Xanthus Russell Smith, circa 1875.
- Born: February 26, 1839; Philadelphia, Pennsylvania
- Died: December 2, 1929 (aged 90); Glenside, Pennsylvania
- Education: Pennsylvania Academy of the Fine Arts
- Known for: Marine painter
- Notable work: The Monitor and the Merrimack (1869), Union League of Philadelphia; The Kearsarge and Alabama (1875), Union League of Philadelphia

Xanthus Russell Smith (February 26, 1839, Philadelphia, Pennsylvania – December 2, 1929, Glenside, Pennsylvania) was an American marine painter best known for his illustrations of the American Civil War.

== Biography ==
Born in Philadelphia, Pennsylvania, the son of painters William Thompson Russell Smith and Mary Priscilla Wilson, he was educated at home by his mother, who also gave him drawing lessons. Between 1851 and 1852, he accompanied his parents and sister Mary Russell Smith on the family's tour of Europe. After returning home, he studied chemistry at the University of Pennsylvania, before enrolling at the Pennsylvania Academy of the Fine Arts. He served in the Union Navy as a captain's clerk during the American Civil War, helping to maintain the blockade of Charleston, South Carolina. He saw little action, and sketched hundreds of ships in a variety of media, including pencil and oil paint, both for official purposes and for his own pleasure.

His father built a suburban villa, "Edgehill", in Glenside, Pennsylvania, a couple miles outside of Philadelphia, that included a large artist's studio. In 1879, Smith married Mary Binder, the daughter of a wealthy Philadelphia lumber dealer. The Smiths settled at Edgehill, where they raised their three children, Mary Russell "Polly" (1880–1938), Xanthus Russell Jr. (1886–1961), and George Russell (1890–1943). Smith also maintained a studio at 1020 Chestnut Street in Philadelphia for over thirty years, and painted until his death at age 90.

== Selected works ==
Smith did not actually participate in most of the battles he illustrated; instead, he generally consulted those who were present at the engagements. His first major work, The Monitor and the Merrimack — 1869, oil on canvas, 30 x 66 inches (76.2 x 167.6 cm.), Union League of Philadelphia — was critically acclaimed. His paintings were sometimes massive: Final Assault upon Fort Fisher, North Carolina — 1872–73, oil on canvas, 56 x 123-1/2 inches (142.2 x 313.7 cm.), Pennsylvania Academy of the Fine Arts — is more than 10 feet wide.

There are seven known versions of the famous June 19, 1864 naval battle between the USS Kearsarge and the Confederate ship Alabama, each a unique composition:

- Sinking of the Rebel Cruiser Alabama by the U.S.S. Kearsage, 1868, oil on canvas, 10 x 18 inches (25.4 x 45.7 cm.), Collection of the Art Fund, Inc. at the Birmingham Museum of Art; Gift of Regions Bank
- The Sinking of the Alabama, c. 1865–70, oil on canvas, 8.2 x 14.7 inches (20.8 x 37.3 cm.), private collection.
- Battle between Kearsarge and Alabama, c. 1870, oil on canvas, 9-5/8 x 14-7/8 inches (24.4 x 37.8 cm.), Mariners' Museum, Newport News, Virginia.
- The Kearsarge and Alabama, 1875, oil on canvas, 56-1/2 x 96 inches (143.5 x 243.8 cm.), Union League of Philadelphia. A popular attraction at the 1876 Centennial Exposition.
- The Close of the Engagement, 1886, oil on canvas, 21 x 36 inches (53.3 x 91.4 cm.), Debra Force Fine Art, Inc., New York City.
- Battle of the Kearsarge and Alabama, 1892, watercolor on paper, 19-3/4 x 29-3/4 inches (50.2 x 75.6 cm.), Morris Museum of Art, Augusta, Georgia.
- The Sinking of the CSS Alabama, 1922, oil on canvas, dimensions unknown, Franklin D. Roosevelt Presidential Library and Museum, Hyde Park, New York. Commissioned by former Assistant Secretary of the Navy Franklin D. Roosevelt .

Smith's paintings and sketches were used to illustrate a large number of Civil War histories, including the 1926 biography he wrote of his former commanding officer, Admiral Samuel Francis du Pont. Examples of his work are at the U.S. Naval Academy in Annapolis, Maryland, and the U.S. Naval Historical Center in Washington, D.C. Others are in the collections of the Metropolitan Museum of Art, the Museum of Fine Arts, Boston, the Columbus Museum of Art, the Delaware Art Museum, the Columbia Museum of Art, and the Addison Gallery of American Art. His unpublished autobiography, An Unvarnished Tale, along with his family papers are preserved in the Archives of American Art at the Smithsonian Institution.

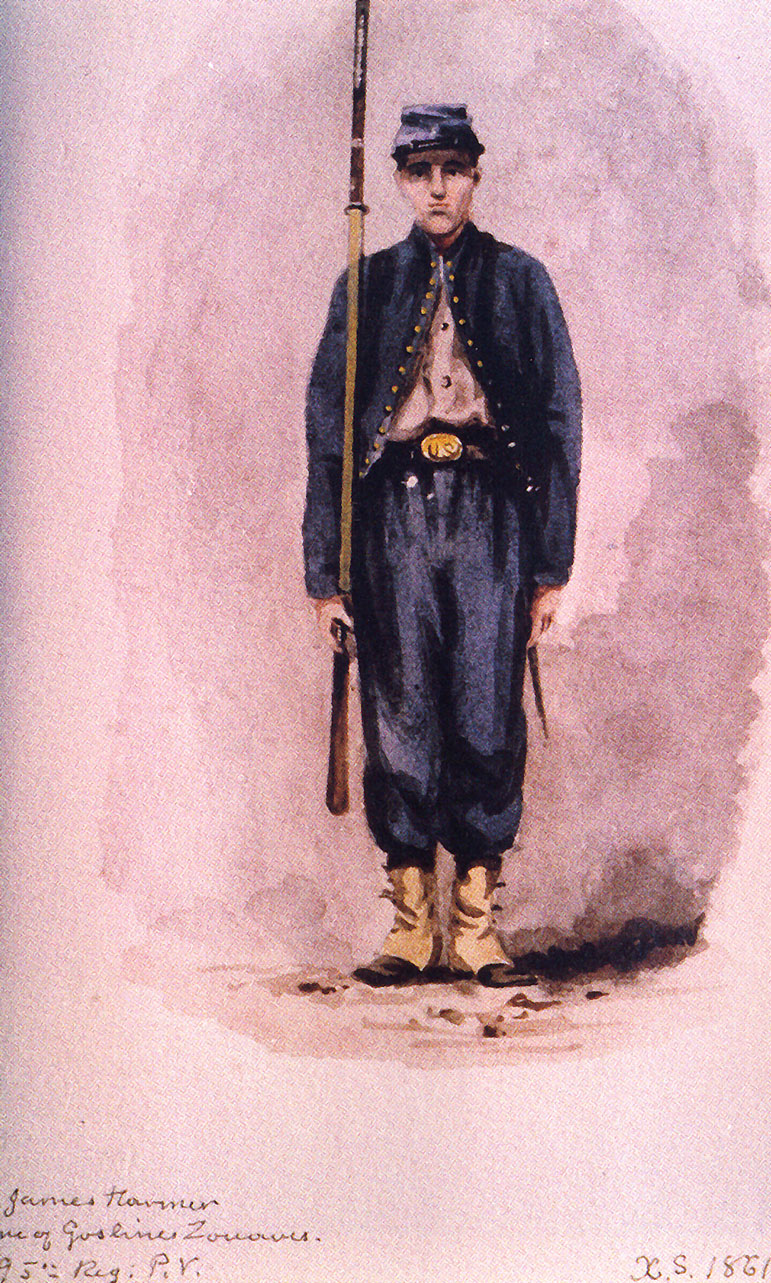
Goslin Zouava, 95th Regiment, Private (1861), watercolor on paper, United States Army Center of Military History, Washington, D.C.

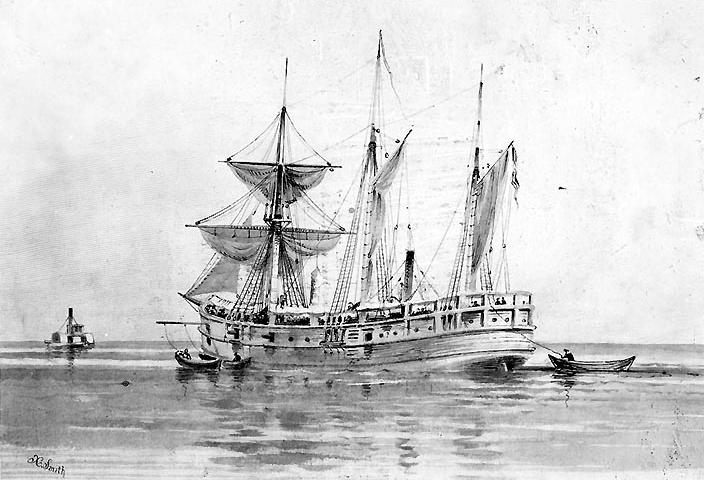
USS Norwich (1861), graphite on paper, U.S. Naval Historical Center, Washington, D.C.

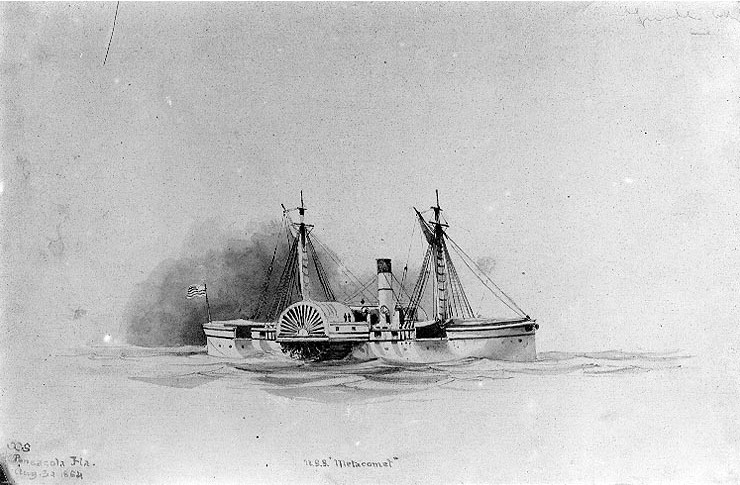
USS Metacomet at Pensacola, Florida, 30 August 1864 (1864), graphite on paper, U.S. Naval Historical Center, Washington, D.C.

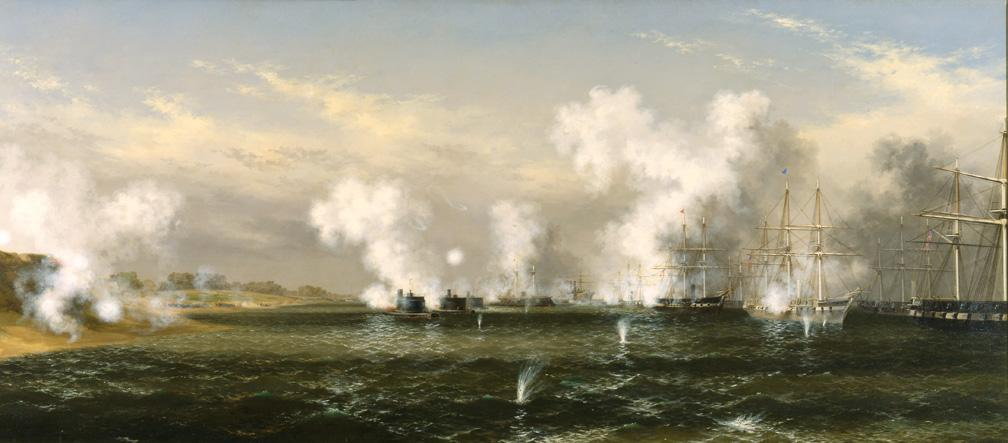
Final Assault upon Fort Fisher (1872–73), Pennsylvania Academy of the Fine Arts, Philadelphia, Pennsylvania.

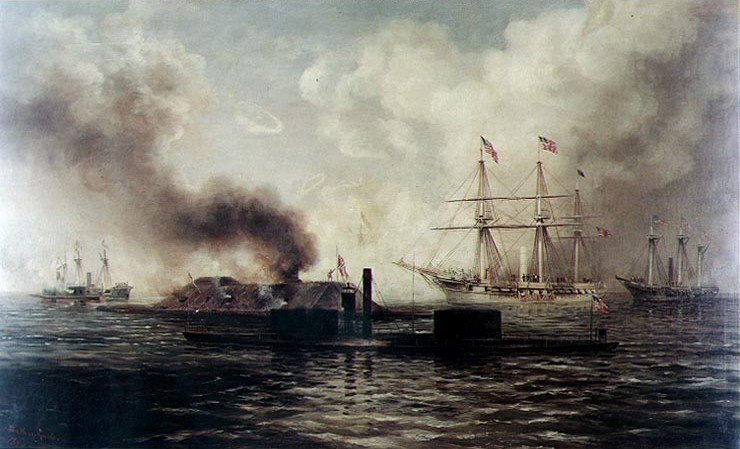
Battle of Mobile Bay, 5 August 1864 (1890), U.S. Naval Academy, Annapolis, Maryland.

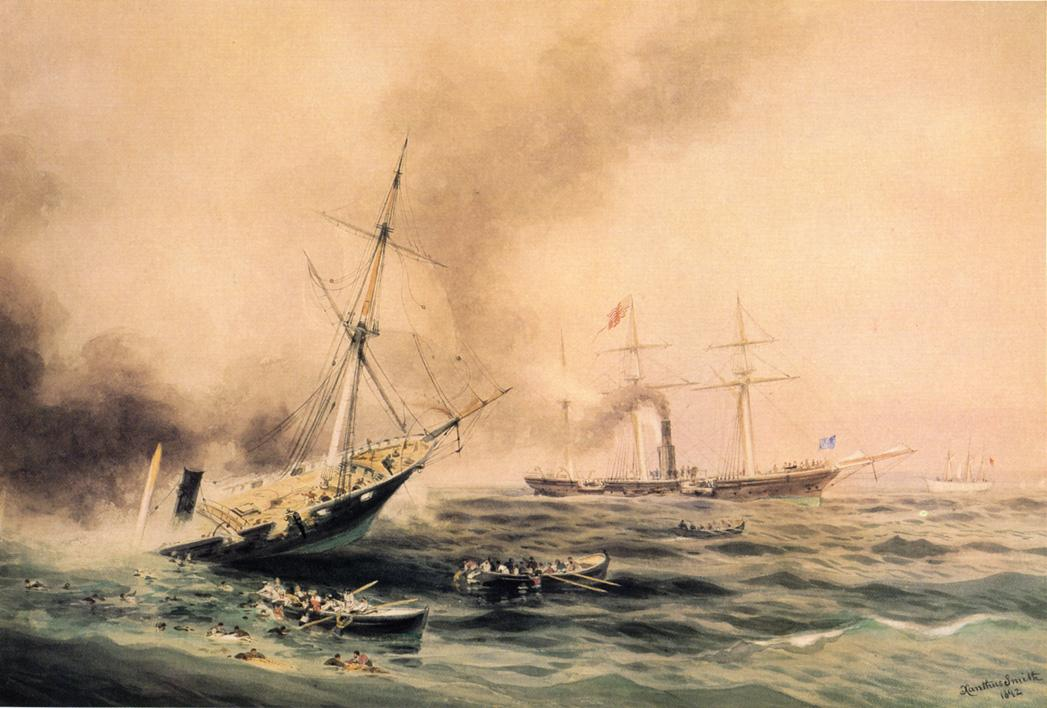
Battle of the Kearsarge and Alabama (1892), Morris Museum of Art, Augusta, Georgia.

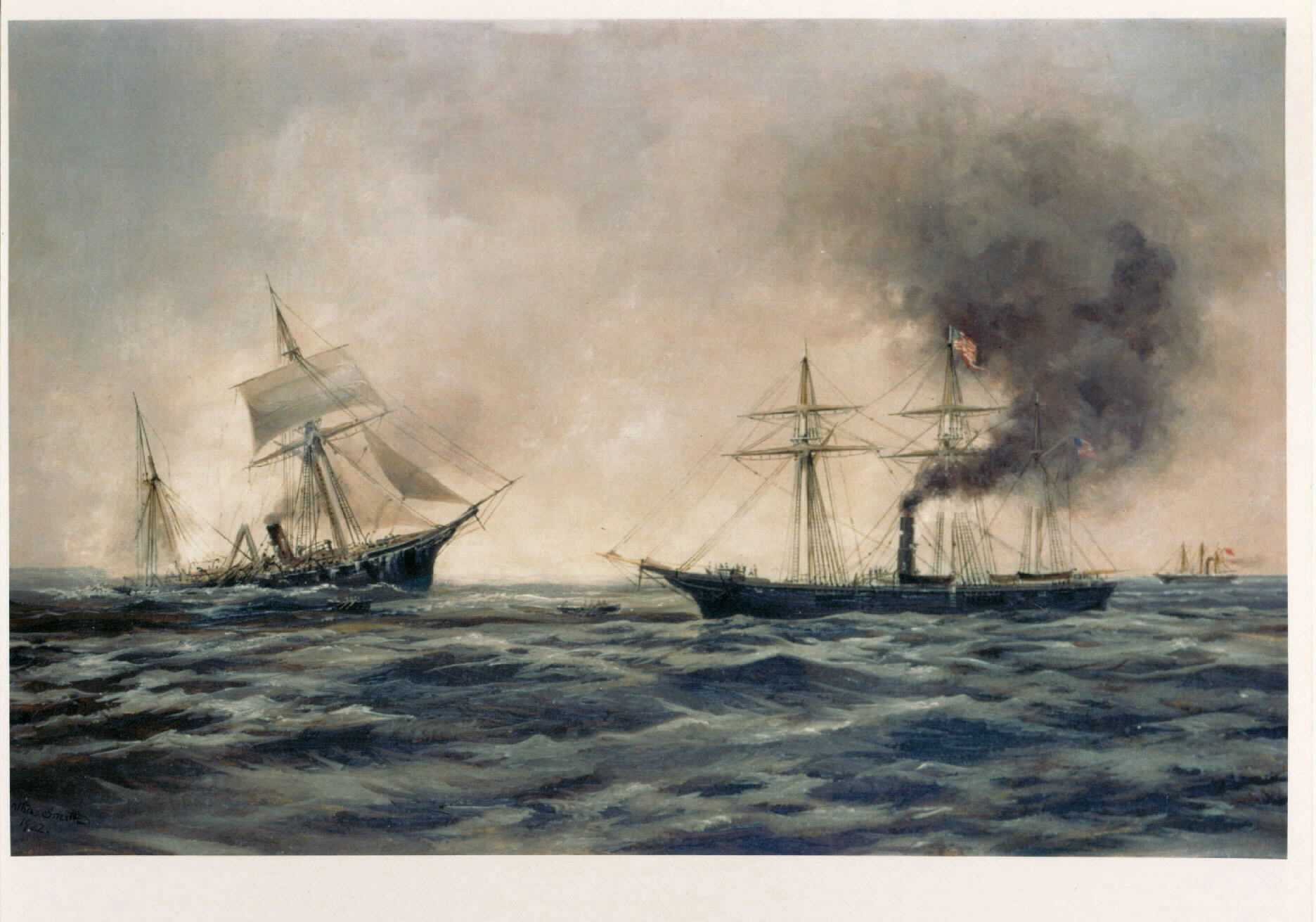
The Sinking of the CSS Alabama (1922), Franklin D. Roosevelt Presidential Library, Hyde Park, New York.
