= Mary Perkins Taylor =

American painter

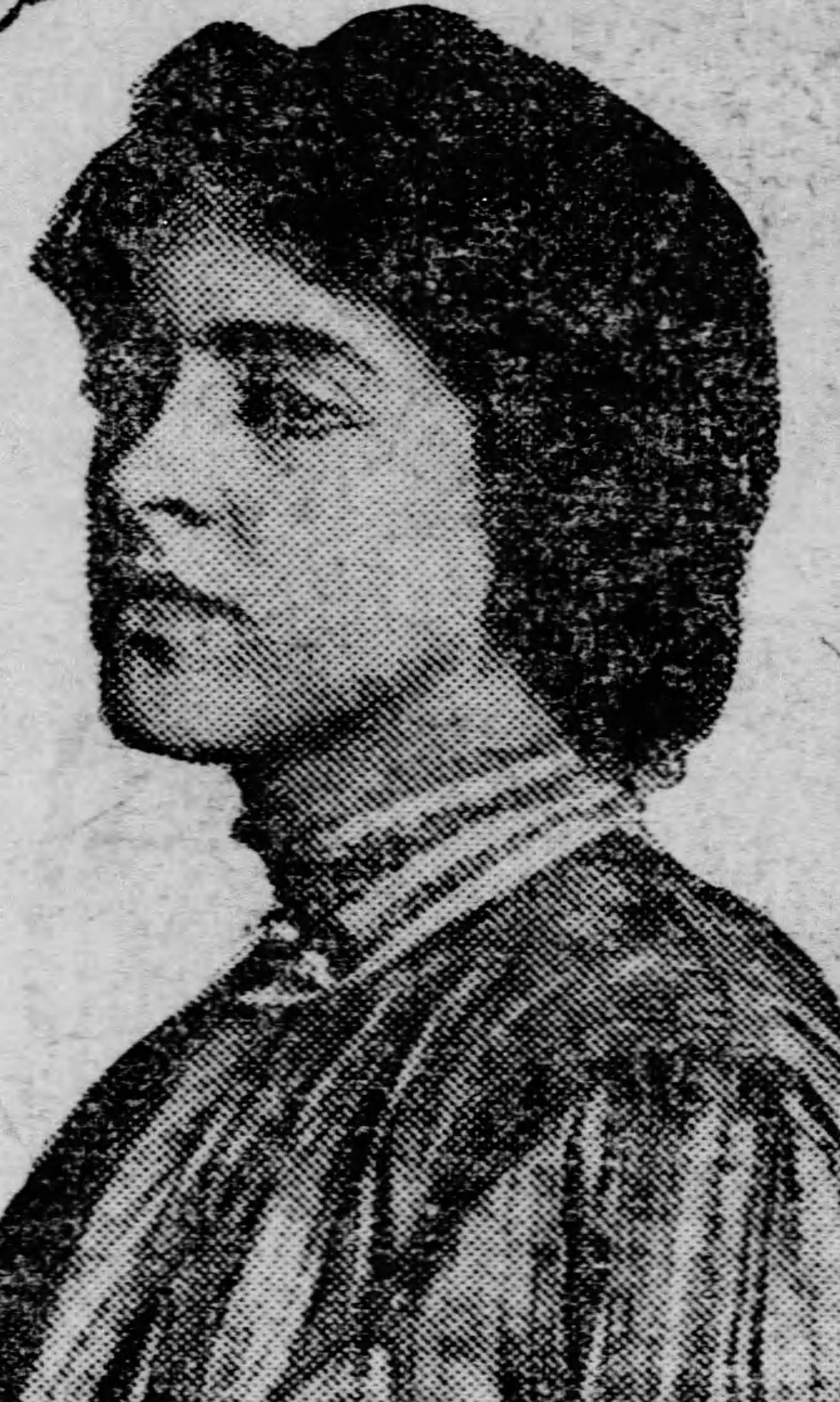
- Mary Smyth Perkins (Taylor) in 1907
- Born: 1875; Philadelphia, Pennsylvania
- Died: December 12, 1931 (aged 55–56); Germantown, Pennsylvania

Mary Smyth Perkins Taylor (1875–1931) was an American Impressionist painter and fabric artist. She was a member of a group of artists centered in Bucks County, Pennsylvania known as the Delaware Valley group, or the Pennsylvania Impressionists.

== Biography ==
Mary Perkins Taylor was born Mary Smyth Perkins in Philadelphia, Pennsylvania in 1875.

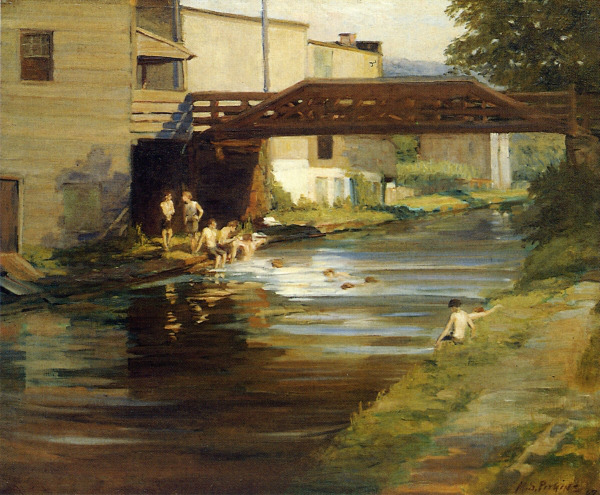
Boys Bathing In The Canal, New Hope, 1909

She entered the Philadelphia School of Design for Women at age fifteen. There she studied under William Sartain and Robert Henry. The school awarded her a fellowship to study abroad in Paris under Charles Cottet and Lucien Simon. The Paris Salon accepted her self-portrait for the 1902 exhibition.

Taylor traveled to paint in Guanajuato, Mexico and exhibited the work in the Rosenbach Gallery in 1905. She attended Pennsylvania Academy of the Fine Arts, where her teachers included Robert Henri. The academy awarded her the Mary Smith Prize in 1907.

She exhibited around Pennsylvania in 1907, including at the opening of Carnegie Institute and a solo exhibition at The Plastic Club.

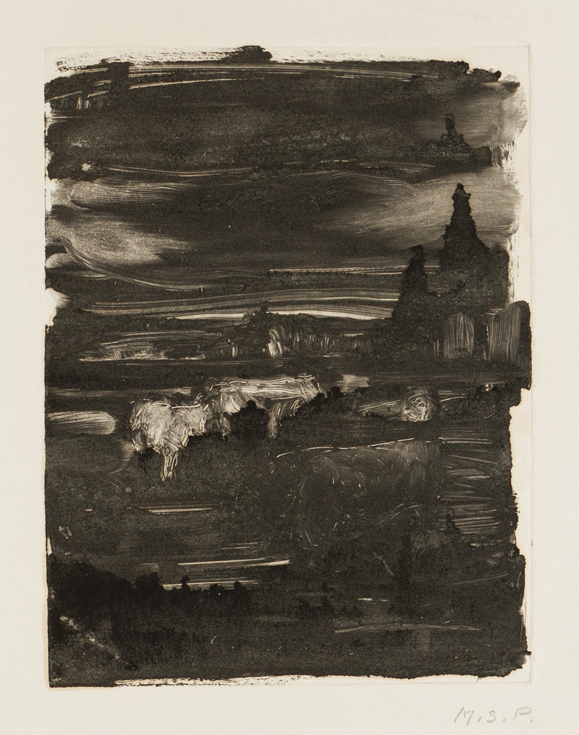
Night Scene #1, 1907, monotype

She began to study with landscape painter and New Hope, Pennsylvania art colony founder William Lathrop in 1906, but moved to become head of the art department of Converse College in South Carolina from 1907 to 1911. She returned to the art colony and married fellow resident William Francis Taylor in 1913. They lived together in Lumberville, Pennsylvania and operated the Hard Times Tavern.

Beginning in the 1920s Taylor turned from painting to making hooked rugs in an impressionist style. She used dyes made from plants in her garden. These natural dyes faded with time, and little of this work survives today.

Mary Perkins Taylor died in Germantown on December 12, 1931.

== Reception ==
The International Studio stated that Taylor "avoided any reading of sentiment into her subject, which she has handled with attractive dignity" in her Mary Smith Prize-winning painting Cows in 1907.

Her fabric art was featured in House Beautiful in 1925, and in exhibitions of the decorative arts. She was described as the first to use the hooked rug method in the style of a painting.

In 2004 her work was exhibited with the group known as the Philadelphia Ten
