= Caroline Peart =

American portrait painter

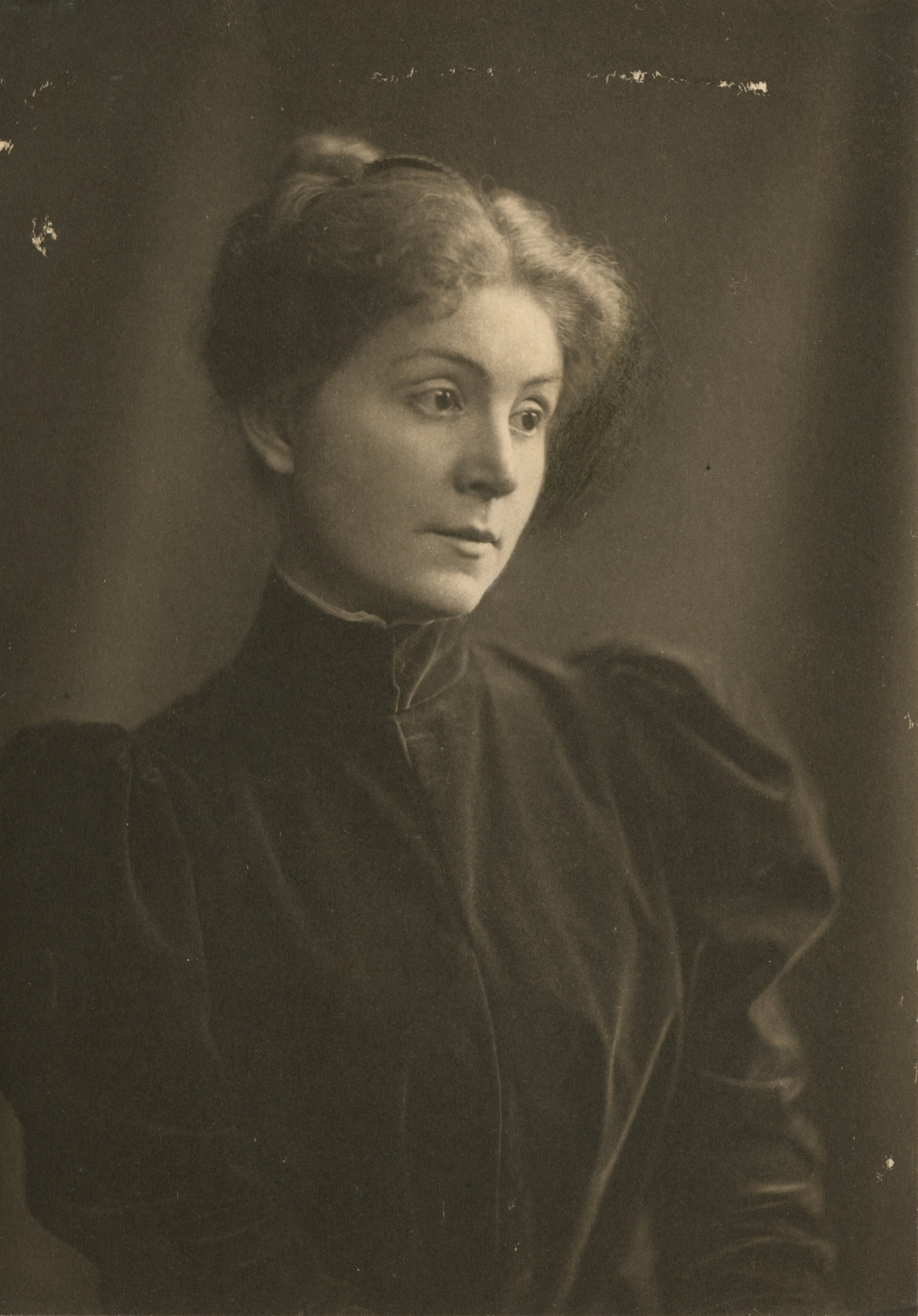
- Caroline Peart, ca. 1895. Courtesy of Archives and Special Collections, Franklin & Marshall College, Lancaster PA.
- Born: Caroline Peart; September 4, 1870; Rosemont, Pennsylvania, U.S.
- Died: October 12, 1963 (aged 93); Lancaster, Pennsylvania, U.S.
- Education: Pennsylvania Academy of the Fine Arts
- Known for: Portrait painting
- Awards: Mary Smith Prize, PAFA (1898)

Caroline Peart (September 4, 1870 – October 12, 1963) was an American portraitist. She was born in Rosemont, Pennsylvania, split her time traveling abroad in Europe and the States, before settling down back in Washington Boro, Pennsylvania, where she eventually died. She was also a student and contemporary of American society portraitist Cecilia Beaux.

Despite her studies and several successes in the art world, Peart did not become an established professional. This is largely due to her work being centered around traditional portraiture during a time when modernism was becoming the trend in America but also because of a lack of drive and a mix of struggles in her personal life.

== Early years and family ==
Peart was born in Rosemont, Pennsylvania, (Note: Since Peart's early life is not well-documented, there are disagreeing sources as to which city she was born in. Katharine Snider's dissertation writes Rosemont, Pennsylvania as her birthplace, while Dusty Kreider's article writes Columbia, Pennsylvania.) into a middle-class family. She was the only child of John Peart and Martha Ann Herr Peart (nee Brenneman). Through her mother, Peart was the half-cousin of American artist and illustrator N. C. Wyeth. Martha was also a direct descendant of Hans Herr, the first ordained Mennonite bishop to emigrate to the American colonies in 1710. This lineage caused the family much pride, as Caroline and her mother often attended Herr family reunions, and Martha served as Vice President of the Hans Herr Memorial Association, when it was established in 1895. Before marrying Martha in 1867, John Peart had fought during the Civil War for the Union Army, serving as sergeant major in the 195th Regiment of the Pennsylvania Volunteer Infantry. After the war, he went into the lumber business in Columbia, which started to boom around 1876-77 and caused the family to move to Philadelphia where they lived on Logan Square at 1901 Vine Street.

When Peart was young, she attended a Philadelphia-area Friends school. (Note: Documentation on Caroline stated that she attended a school called Philadelphia Friends School. However, according to Snider's dissertation, there is no school with this name. She states that Caroline could have attended Friends' Central School in Wyneewood, but it is unclear.) Although little is known about her early life, her father's business successes allowed for many connections among the Philadelphian elite, opportunities at home and abroad, and a rather comfortable life in Peart's early years.

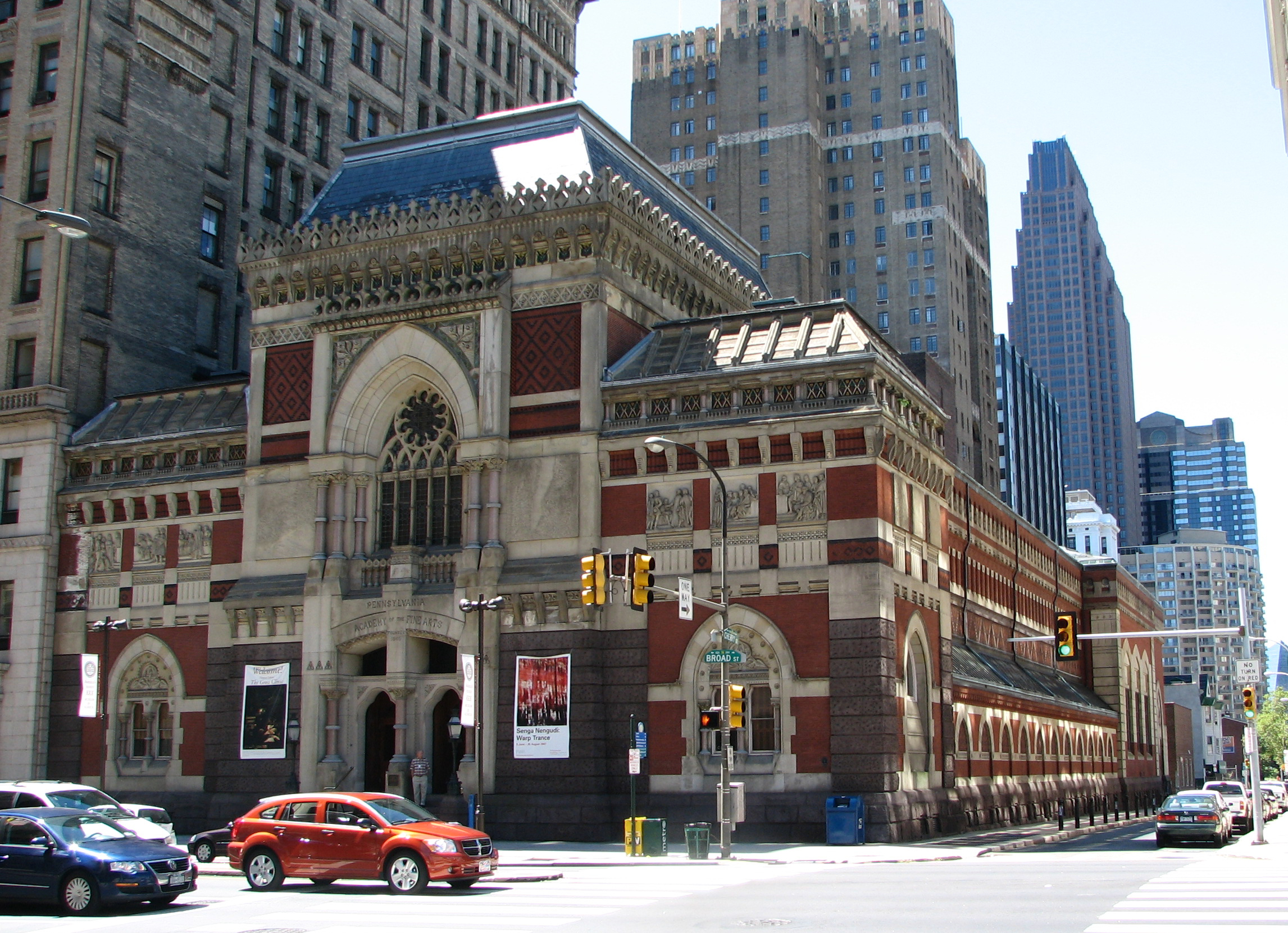
The Pennsylvania Academy of the Fine Arts Building

== Arts education ==
In October 1887, at the age of 17, Peart enrolled at the Pennsylvania Academy of the Fine Arts. The Academy was founded in 1805 and is considered to be the oldest functioning museum and art school in the United States.

Her first class was called Night Life and Antique, which she took from October 1887 to January 1888. In October, she also took the Portrait class that artist Cecilia Beaux was teaching. In March 1888, Peart demonstrated sufficient skills and advanced to the Life class. She took this class for one month and then enrolled in the Full Privilege class in April 1888. From May to September 1888, she was absent from the Academy. When she returned in October, she enrolled in the Portrait class until December 1888.

Beginning in 1889, Peart took a hiatus from her education until she returned in 1893 to take the Women's Life class. In 1894, she enrolled in the Women's Life class and Head class for a month and a second Life class held at night for one month. In 1895-96 and 1896–97, Peart repeated the Life and Head classes.

== Travels to Europe ==
During the time from 1888 to 1909, Peart traveled to Europe extensively both for pleasure and for artistic practice, which accounted for her many absences and hiatuses from her time at the Academy.

In 1888, when she was 18, Peart traveled to Europe for the first time, specifically to Italy, Spain, and France. During her travels, she made dozens of small paintings on "academy boards," which were an economical and lightweight alternative to traditional canvases. Three still exist today.

In 1900, Peart split her time between Paris and Spain. Most notably in Paris, she attended James Abbott McNeill Whistler's Académie Carmen. However, after requesting to return for a second period of study, she was rejected via letter, as they believed she was already sufficiently educated and would not benefit from more training.

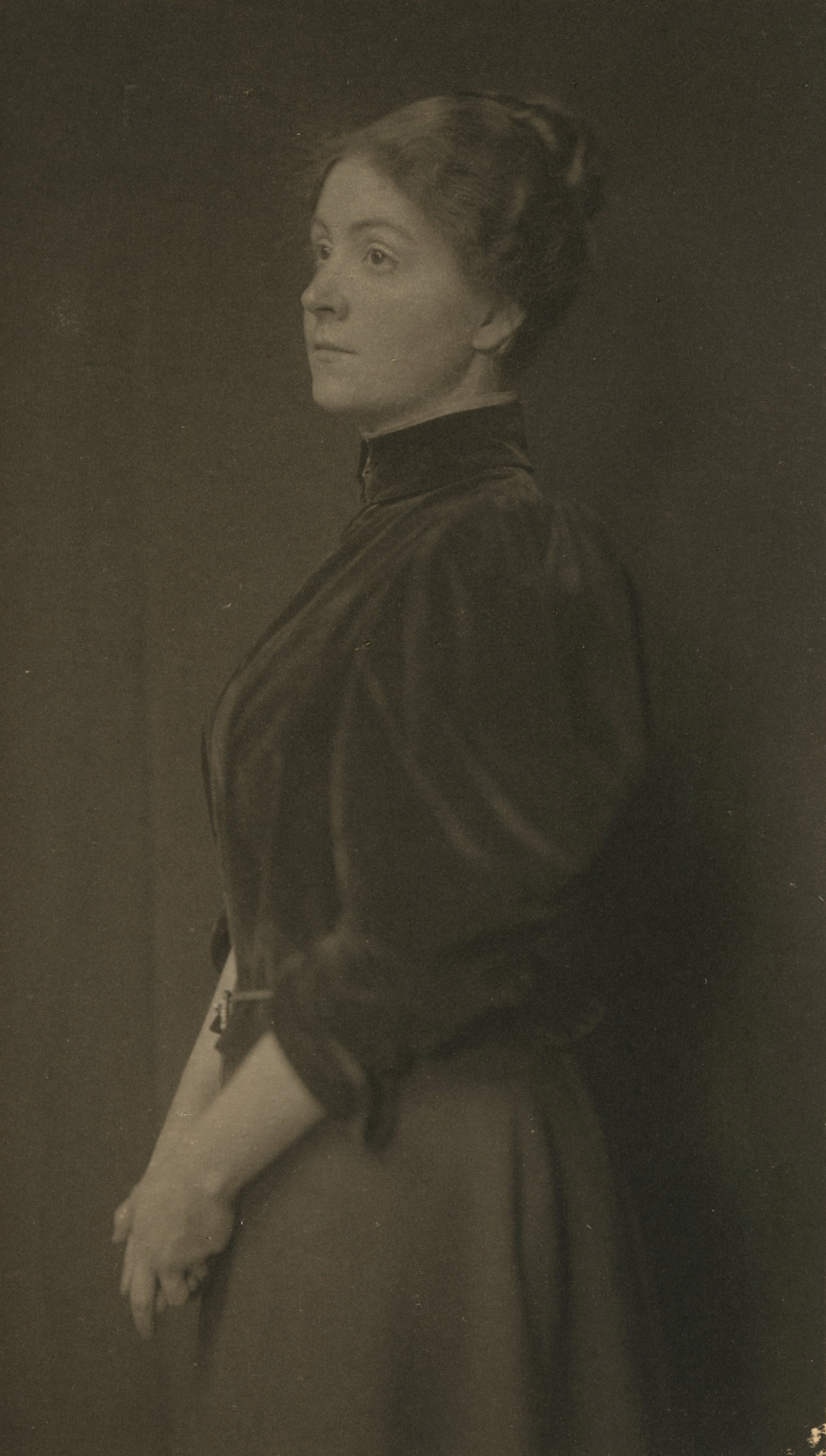
circa. 1895 Courtesy of Archives and Special Collections, Franklin & Marshall College, Lancaster PA

== Career ==
Peart often used family members as subject matter for her paintings. She rarely had professional commissions or any significant income from selling her work. In one diary entry, she noted an instance in which she was paid $75 for a portrait, but otherwise, she did not sell anything else. She also did not seem to have any patrons as other artists of her time period, like Cecilia Beaux or Mary Cassatt. However, between 1892 and 1905, Peart would often rent various studios in Philadelphia when she was particularly focused on her work.

=== Exhibitions ===
In between attending PAFA and traveling abroad, Peart also submitted her work at various exhibitions. Around 1889, she submitted portraits to the National Academy of Design, but they were rejected. This rejection caused a six-year hiatus in submitting works for consideration. But then, Peart would find that from 1895 to 1903, her paintings were included in 9 exhibits at the Pennsylvania Academy of the Fine Arts' renowned yearly exhibitions. In 1895, her portrait of George Bockius, titled G.J.B., was selected. In 1896, The Green Glove, a portrait of her mother holding a green glove, was selected. In 1898, her painting Once Upon a Time won the Mary Smith Prize, which was considered to be the highest honor that the Pennsylvania Academy of the Fine Arts awarded to a female artist in residence. Unfortunately, Peart's 1899, 1901, and 1902 entries, titled Friends, Evening, Paris, and A Sketch, were all lost. Her work A Sea Breeze had the honor of being illustrated in the 1903 exhibition catalogue. Two of her other works, Grace and Portrait, were also displayed during this year.

In 1901, Peart was one of 29 Philadelphia-based artists who exhibited at the Pan-American Exhibition in Buffalo, New York, in which Peart submitted Sea Breeze and Once Upon A Time. James Whistler also was asked to exhibit his work here. During this year, Peart also exhibited one of her portraits at the Art Club's 13th Annual Exhibition in Philadelphia.

The last portrait Peart exhibited publicly was a portrait of her cousin Carolyn Breneman Bockius, which was displayed on January 21, 1905.

=== Other roles in the art world ===
In addition to being an artist, Peart also navigated the Philadelphia art scene through professional organizations and committee work. She was a part of the Plastic Club, an art club located in Philadelphia which provided ways for socializing, collaborating, and promoting the professional advancement of women in art. Her involvement in the club included contributing to its exhibitions, serving on a committee that selected and installed works for an exhibition, giving lectures, as well as being a part of discussions. In May 1903, she was even elected to the Exhibitions Committee.

== Later years and death ==
From their home in Philadelphia, the family moved one more time in 1902 to Rosemont, before finally settling in West Chester in 1905, where they purchased a large home called "Ardossan Park". However, on January 25, 1906, John Peart died suddenly at the age of 66 after suffering from long bouts of illnesses in the years leading up to his death. In March, Peart and her mother moved into Ardossan Park. After this year, Peart rarely, if at all, painted.

On October 15, 1914, Peart married Christian Brinton, an art critic who has been credited with introducing the work of a wide variety of artists. She most likely became acquainted with the Brinton family through her cousin, N.C. Wyeth. The couple were both 44 years old when they married. Their marriage soon deteriorated in 1917, but their divorce wasn't official until 1921.

In March 1920, Peart and her mother sold Ardossen and moved to Washington Boro. They also had an apartment in Atlantic City, New Jersey for a time. During the remainder of the 1920s and into the 1930s, Peart and her mother split their time between Washington Boro and Atlantic City, occasionally traveling to other states. The traveling was very hard for Peart, whose health was getting worse and worse.

Martha Peart died at the age of 97 on December 8, 1940, while residing at the Turks Head Hotel in West Chester, Pennsylvania. After her mother's death, Peart permanently moved to Washington Boro in 1941, living in a house that had no electricity, water, or even a bathroom. Her mental health was deteriorating, and she may have suffered from some sort of dementia as well as depression.

In the early 1950s, a neighbor named Grace Sherick (Note: Sources differ when it comes to the identity of the woman who befriended and cared for Peart in her later years. Snider's dissertation writes of a Grace Sherick, and even interviewed her son for her paper. However, Dusty Kreider writes of a woman named Margaret Miller Schock, who Snider makes no mention of.) began to take care of the elderly Peart, which included taking her on errands or a drive, picking up items for her, or simply keeping her company. Sherick had also used funds from an inactive bank account of Peart's to help renovate the home and purchase a car. Sherick had become a much needed friend for Peart during the last few years of her life.

About two weeks before Peart's death, she broke her hip after a fall. After being taken to the hospital, Peart was transferred to the Pickel Nursing Home in Columbia. She then died on October 12, 1963, at Lancaster General Hospital at the age of 93.

== Legacy ==
=== Franklin & Marshall College ===
Peart's will stated that all her property would go to her mother Martha; but if her mother had already died, the entire estate would then be transferred to Franklin & Marshall College, which was a rather surprising as she and her family had barely any ties to the institution. Nonetheless, her estate was valued at about $565,000, (Note: This is over $5 million today.) and also included all of her paintings which remains in the permanent collection at the College's Phillips Museum of Art. The College also inherited the Herr-Peart Cemetery in Washington Boro, just 10 miles from the college, which they have been maintaining since 1963 as part of an agreement tied to the cash donation that underwrites scholarships for students who are residents of Pennsylvania and, preferably, Lancaster County, known as the John Peart Foundation.

Peart's many diaries and letters are now in the Franklin & Marshall College archives, however they are not for public view. Her earliest existing diary dates from 1891.

=== Posthumous exhibitions ===
Carol Faill, the Special Collections Curator at Franklin & Marshall College, has organized several exhibitions of Peart's work, including a duel exhibition featuring paintings by Peart and Jacob Eichholtz at Franklin and Marshall College (April 1–26, 1966). She has also organized solo exhibitions at the Brandywine River Museum (September 11-November 21, 1982), the Pennsylvania Academy of the Fine Arts' Peale House Galleries (January 9-February 2, 1986), the Governor's Mansion in Harrisburg, and CIGNA Galleries in Philadelphia, Pennsylvania (both exhibitions were in the early 1980s).

In 2012, Megan Cohen, an art history major at Franklin & Marshall, researched Peart's work from the college's permanent collection and designed an exhibition of small works which were on display around April through May.

== List of known artworks ==
- Portrait of Martha Peart, 1895. Franklin & Marshall College and the Permanent Collections of The Phillips Museum of Art, Lancaster, Pennsylvania.
- Woman with Green Necklace, n.d. Franklin & Marshall College and the Permanent Collections of The Phillips Museum of Art, Lancaster, Pennsylvania.
- Seated Woman with Green Beads, n.d. Franklin & Marshall College and the Permanent Collections of The Phillips Museum of Art, Lancaster, Pennsylvania.
- Portrait of John Peart, n.d. Franklin & Marshall College and the Permanent Collections of The Phillips Museum of Art, Lancaster, Pennsylvania.
- Portrait of Elizabeth Jane Harberger, 1896. Franklin & Marshall College and the Permanent Collections of The Phillips Museum of Art, Lancaster, Pennsylvania.
- Self Portrait, n.d. Franklin & Marshall College and the Permanent Collections of The Phillips Museum of Art, Lancaster, Pennsylvania.
- Portrait of Mary Peart, 1897. Franklin & Marshall College and the Permanent Collections of The Phillips Museum of Art, Lancaster, Pennsylvania.
- Woman with Violet Corsage, n.d. Franklin & Marshall College and the Permanent Collections of The Phillips Museum of Art, Lancaster, Pennsylvania.
- Green Gloves (Martha Peart), 1896. Franklin & Marshall College and the Permanent Collections of The Phillips Museum of Art, Lancaster, Pennsylvania.
- Once Upon a Time, n.d. Franklin & Marshall College and the Permanent Collections of The Phillips Museum of Art, Lancaster, Pennsylvania.
- Sea Breeze (Alice Staman), n.d. Franklin & Marshall College and the Permanent Collections of The Phillips Museum of Art, Lancaster, Pennsylvania.
- Grace, n.d. Franklin & Marshall College and the Permanent Collections of The Phillips Museum of Art, Lancaster, Pennsylvania.
- Carolyn Breneman Bockius, Age 10, 1896. Franklin & Marshall College and the Permanent Collections of The Phillips Museum of Art, Lancaster, Pennsylvania.
- Portrait of Carolyn Breneman Bockius (Mrs. N.C. Wyeth), n.d. Franklin & Marshall College and the Permanent Collections of The Phillips Museum of Art, Lancaster, Pennsylvania.
- Portrait of Carolyn Breneman Bockius (Mrs. N.C. Wyeth), n.d. Franklin & Marshall College and the Permanent Collections of The Phillips Museum of Art, Lancaster, Pennsylvania.
