= Nina B. Ward =

American painter (1885–1944)

Nina Belle Ward (1885-1944), an American painter, was born to James Pegram Ward and Martha Vesta Payne on January 23, 1885, in Rome, Georgia. After attending high school in Chattanooga, Tennessee, she attended New York University's School of Pedagogy from 1902 to 1903, after which she became a student at the St. Louis School of Fine Arts during the 1905–06 academic year and won silver and bronze medals as well as an honorable mention for her color and black and white portraits, From 1907 through 1912 she attended the Pennsylvania Academy of the Fine Arts (PAFA) where she won Cresson Traveling fellowships in 1908, 1909 and 1911 (among the first American women to be awarded the fellowship and the only woman to have been awarded three) allowing her to visit England, Wales, the Netherlands, France, Switzerland, Austria, Germany, Belgium and Spain.

She exhibited paintings twice at the Corcoran Museum in Washington, D.C. in 1912 ("Portrait") and 1916 ("Young Woman in Black"). She won the first Toppan Prize at PAFA in 1912 and in 1914 she won the Mary Smith Prize for her painting "Elizabeth" at the Annual PAFA exhibit. She exhibited at PAFA each year between 1911 and 1918: 1906, "Portrait"; 1912, "Portrait of Lady in Black"; 1913, "Woman in Old Fashioned Gown"; 1914, "Elizabeth"; 1915 "Young Girl in White"; 1916 "Lady in Black"; 1917, "The Rose Girl"; and two paintings during the 113th Annual exhibit in 1918, "Portrait: Mrs. Eliot", and "Portrait: Miss Mollie Little". In 1915, her painting, "Young Girl in White" was also selected for the Tenth Annual Exhibition of Selected Paintings by American Artists at the City Art Museum of St. Louis, which opened September 12, 1915.

From 1912 through 1917 she taught drawing and painting at The Shipley School in Bryn Mawr, Pennsylvania, while residing at 1719 Green Street, Philadelphia. Until 1922, she taught art in Pennsylvania, Delaware (Wilmington High School), and Ohio (Cleveland Junior High) before settling in Kalamazoo, Michigan. During the summer of 1922 she attended the Chicago Art Institute. She began teaching at Central High School in Kalamazoo in the fall of 1922 where she remained employed until 1943. Nina Ward was instrumental in founding the Kalamazoo Institute of the Arts (KIA) where she was the first and only teacher for several years. She also exhibited her work at the Michigan Art Show (Detroit, 1932) and in 1945, after her death, Ward's paintings were shown in a joint exhibition with the work of her student, Helen Janaszak . In 1930 she published an article in The School-Arts Magazine, in which she described the program she founded at KIA. She specialized in portraits but also painted the occasional still life and scenes from New England where she often spent summers painting, often accompanied by one or two of her students.

Nina Ward lived at 618 Potter Street in Kalamazoo, Michigan before her death on September 20, 1944, after a year-long sickness during which time she was nursed by her brother, Alexander Pitzer Ward. She was buried on September 25, 1944, at the Forrest Hills Cemetery in Chattanooga, Tennessee.

Today her paintings are included in the permanent collections of the Pennsylvania Academy of Fine Arts, The Woodmere Art Museum, and the Kalamazoo Institute of Arts. One of her still life paintings is included in the Olivet College exhibition, "Beautiful Things: Still Life Paintings by American Women 1880-1940" at Olivet College, January 16-February 14, 2014. A retrospective of her work is being mounted at KIA from May 16, 2015 – August 23, 2015. Dana Ward maintains a website with images of Nina Ward's paintings.

- A Catalogue of the Officers and Students of Washington University, for the Academic Year 1905-1906, Washington University in St. Louis, Washington University Record, V1, N3, November 1905, p. 230.
- Blackenburg Portrait
- Ward, Nina B., "The Saturday Class of Creative Art for Talented Children," The School-Arts Magazine, vol. 29, #5, 1930, pp. 289–292.
- Elizabeth
- Falk, Peter Hastings (1989). Annual Exhibition Record, 1914-68, Pennsylvania Academy of the Fine Arts, pp. 538.
- Falk, Peter Hastings (1989a), Annual Exhibition Record, 1876-1913 Pennsylvania Academy of the Fine Arts, pp. 612.
- Lajeunesse letter, written by Pam Lajeunesse, Assistant to the Registrar, PAFA to Michael Goodison, KIA, February 13, 1976, in KIA files.
- Gloucester Harbor,
- Omoto, Sadayoski (1977). Early Michigan Paintings Kresge Art Center.
- Portrait of a Girl in a Pink Dress
- Portrait of a Woman in Black
- Nina B. Ward Paintings
- Deaths and Burials, Michigan Deaths and Burials, 1800–1995.
