= CAL Spora Luxembourg =

Amateur athletics club in Luxembourg

CAL Spora Luxembourg, abbreviated to CSL, is an amateur athletics club in Luxembourg City, in southern Luxembourg. It is the only club in Luxembourg City, and is the largest club in the country, with around 400 members. CSL is affiliated to the Luxembourg Athletics Federation and the Luxembourg Triathlon Federation: the respective governing bodies for athletics and triathlon. The club is based at Stade Josy Barthel, in the Rollingergrund-North Belair district of north-western Luxembourg City. CSL was formed in 2000 by the fusion of two previous clubs: Cercle d'Athlétisme Luxembourg (CAL) and Spora Club Luxembourg.
