= Martha Walter =

American painter (1875–1976)

- Born: March 19, 1875; Edmonton, Alberta, Canada
- Died: January 1976 (aged 100); Massachusetts
- Occupation: American Impressionist Painter

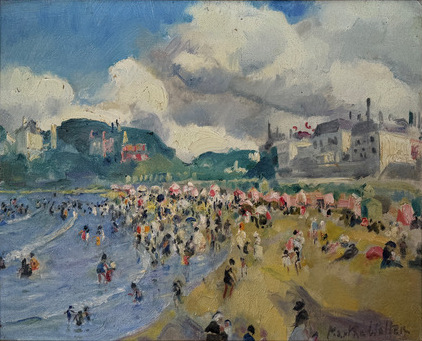
Martha Walter, "Dinard," Oil on Canvas, 14" x 18"

Martha Walter (March 19, 1875 – January 1976) was an American impressionist painter.

== Education ==
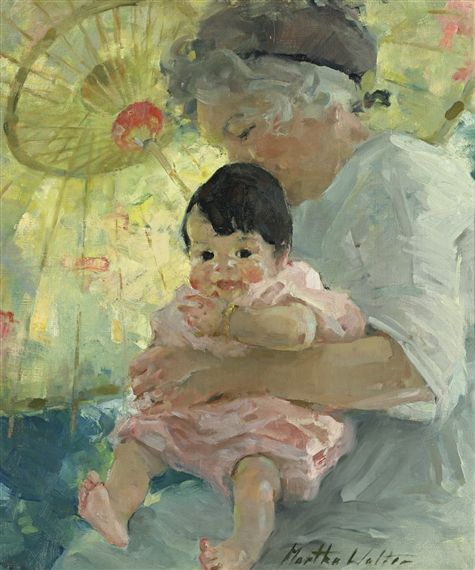
Motherhood by Martha Walter, by 1915

A Philadelphia native, Walter attended Girls High School. She studied art at the Pennsylvania Museum and School of Industrial Art (now the University of the Arts College of Art and Design) from 1895 to 1898 and at the Pennsylvania Academy of the Fine Arts, Philadelphia. She was taught by William Merritt Chase, who painted a portrait of her in 1908. She won the school's Toppan Prize (1902) and Cresson Traveling Scholarship (1908). In 1909 she also won the school's Mary Smith Prize for the best painting by a resident female artist.

== Career ==
Using the Cresson scholarship she traveled to Spain, Italy, the Netherlands, and France. In France, she received tuition from Rene Menard and Lucien Simon at the Académie de la Grande Chaumière.

After returning to New England, she set up a studio in Gloucester, Massachusetts, where she often painted beach scenes. She went on to teach art at Chase's New York School of Art. She often lived with one of her sisters, and sometimes traveled in the summer with Alice Schille, who she had met as an art student. She was also good friends with designer Zerelda Rains, who she met at Chase's Shinnecock Hills Summer School of Art in 1896. The two women worked and traveled together on and off over the next twenty years, including at the New York School of Fine and Applied Arts, successor to the Chase School of Art.

Walter had a show at the Galleries George Petit in Paris in 1922. The French government purchased one of her works titled The Checquered Cape.

She was lauded in her early career for her "intimate portrayal of little children" in paintings such as The Picnic and A Parasol Tea, which were noted particularly for her use of color.

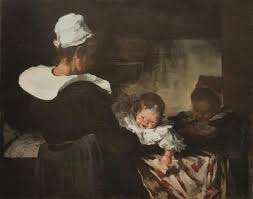
Brittany family by Martha Walter

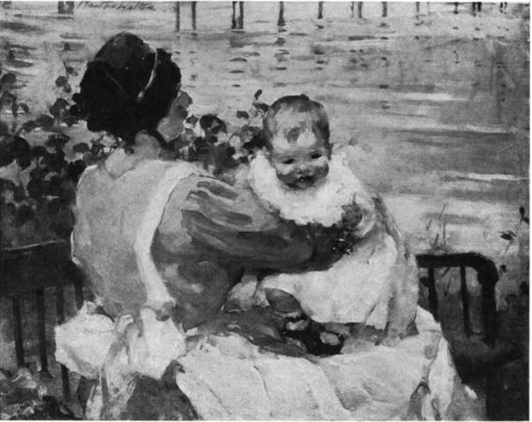
English Nurse by Martha Walter (b&w reprint)

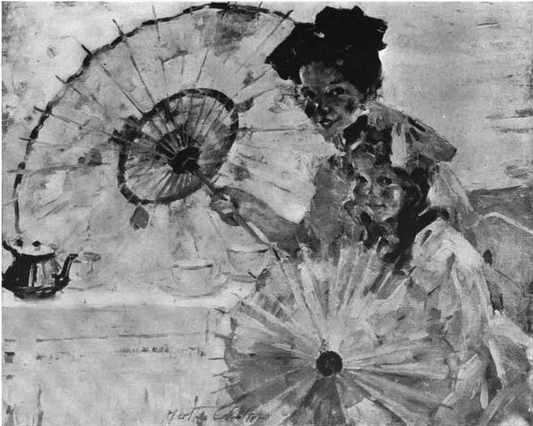
A Parasol Tea by Martha Walter (b&w reprint)

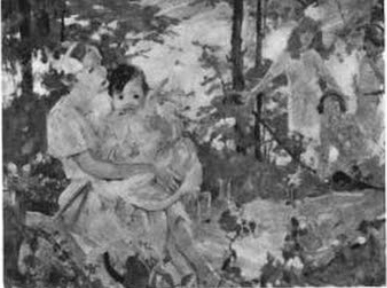
The Picnic by Martha Walter (b&w reprint)

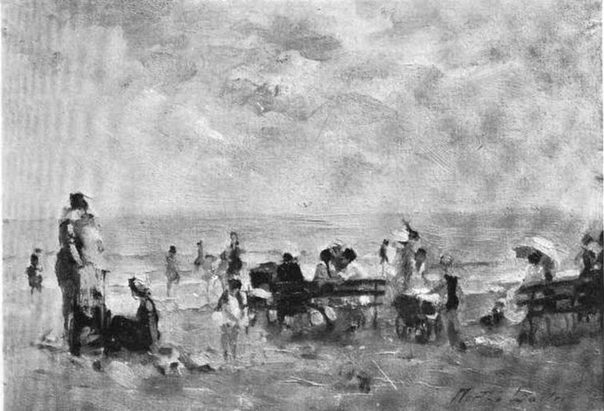
La Plage by Martha Walter (b&w reprint)

In the 1930s, Walter traveled to North Africa and began to paint the market places of Tunis, Tripoli and Algiers. The African sun offered a different lighting than her usual scenes in America and France.

Her estate was purchased in the late 1960s by the David David Gallery of Philadelphia. Walter continued working until a few years before her death in 1976 at age 100.

== Recognition ==
Walter's 1922 painting The Telegram, Detention Room (Ellis Island) was included in the inaugural exhibition of the National Museum of Women in the Arts, American Women Artists 1830-1930, in 1987. Retrospectives showcasing her work include Martha Walter, at the George Thomas Hunter Museum of Art, Chattanooga, TN in 1953; Martha Walter, Hammer Galleries, New York, NY, in 1974–1975; and Impressionist Jewels: The Painting of Martha Walter, A Retrospective, at the Woodmere Art museum in 2002.
