= J.B. Van Sciver Co. =

Furniture company in New Jersey, USA

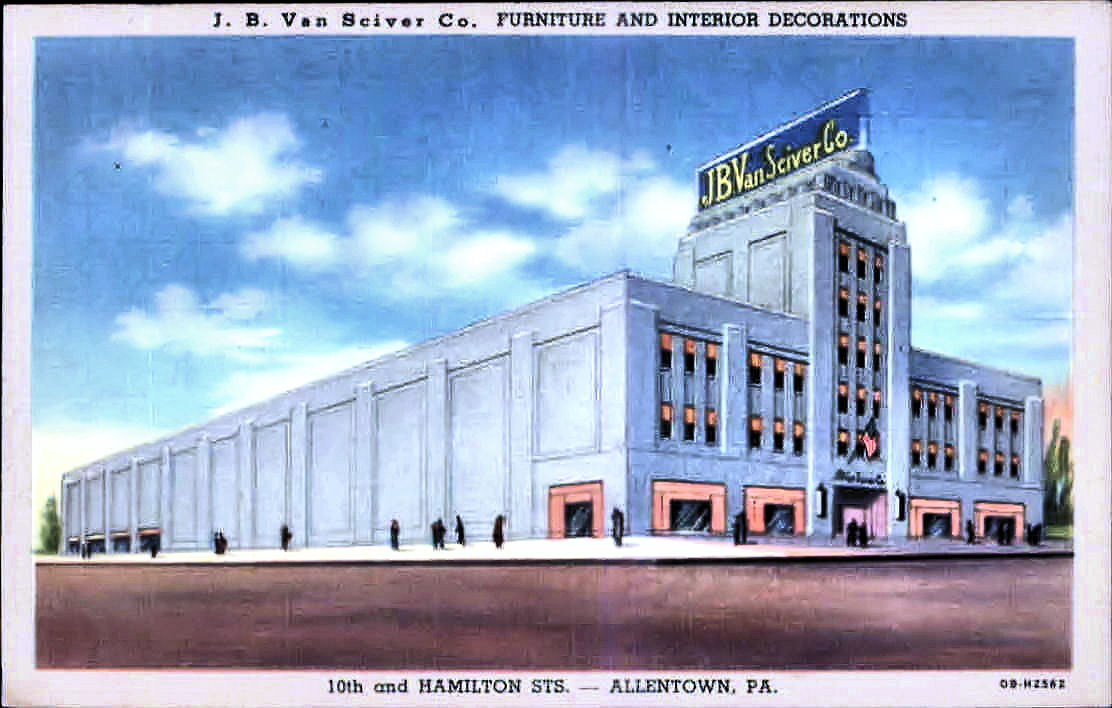
The J.B. Van Sciver Co. building at 10th and Hamilton Street, Allentown, Pennsylvania about 1940

J.B. Van Sciver Furniture Co. was a furniture company in Camden, New Jersey, founded in 1881 by Joseph Bishop Van Sciver and later run by his sons, Joseph Bishop Van Sciver Jr., Lloyd Van Sciver, and Russell Van Sciver. The company also opened stores in Allentown, Pennsylvania and Trenton, New Jersey.

== Joseph Bishop Van Sciver ==
Joseph Bishop Van Sciver (1861–1943), son of Abram and Lydia H. (Bishop) Van Sciver, was born on May 14, 1861, in Hainesport, New Jersey, but was raised in Camden and educated at E.A. Stevens School. He married Flora G. Kelly in Camden on June 9, 1892, and they had four children, Joseph Bishop Jr., Lloyd, Russell, and Ruth. The family were members of the Temple Baptist Church and Joseph was a member of several clubs including Union League, Whitemarsh Valley Country Club, American Academy of Political and Social Science, New Jersey Society of Pennsylvania, and the Netherlands Society.

On his maternal side, Joseph was a descendant of Richard and Margaret Haines, for whom the township of Hainesport where Joseph was born is named. Richard was from London and settled in America in 1683. Joseph's paternal ancestors were John Van Sciver and Charity Morris, who both came from Holland during colonial times.

After establishing the J.B. Van Sciver Co., Joseph branched out into other industries and formed the Hainesport Mining & Transportation Company and the De Frain Sand Company, serving as Vice President for both and later merging them into the Van Sciver Corporation which provided materials to the World War I cause. The corporation was later sold to the Warner Company. Joseph also served as a director of the Knickerbocker Lime Company, a limestone quarry.

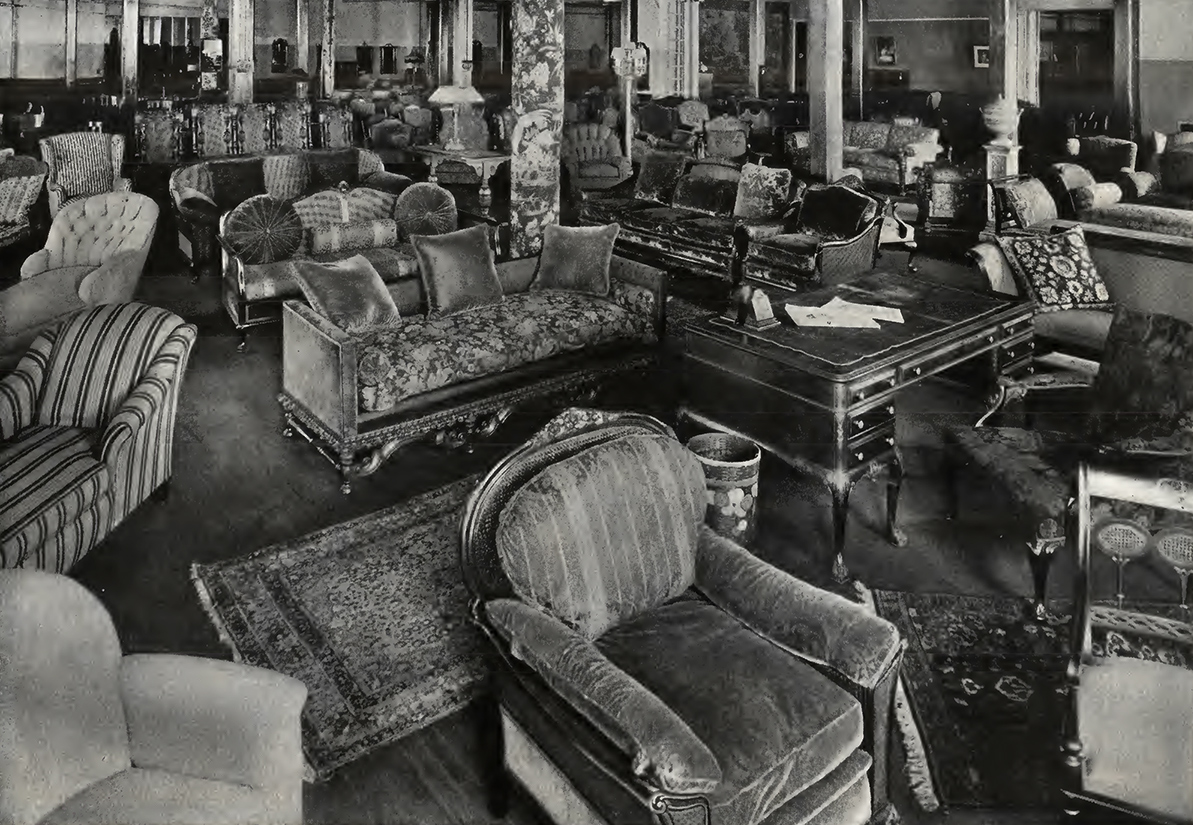
Photo of JB Van Sciver Library and Living Room Furniture from a 1925 catalog

== Growth and decline of company ==
In 1881, Van Sciver opened his furniture business in a small shop only 20 feet in width at 210 Federal Street in Camden. Within only a year the company had grown so much that they moved to a larger location on the same street and by 1888, it was moved to a four-story building on the corner of Delaware and Federal. Over the next 35 years, several additions were constructed onto this building until it occupied ten acres. In 1932, a Trenton store was opened, a building that was designed by Joseph's son Lloyd, while manufacturing was continued in Camden. Five years later, they expanded into Allentown, Pennsylvania, and eventually also established stores in Abington, Pennsylvania, Fairless Hills, Pennsylvania, Bala Cynwyd, Pennsylvania, Lancaster, Pennsylvania, and Wilmington, Delaware.

In 1961, lack of parking around the Trenton store forced the company to abandon it. In 1963, they reopened in hopes the parking problems had been solved but vacated again in 1976 when the building was considered as the Mercer County Manpower Skills Training Center. The Trenton store moved to nearby Oxford Valley in Fairless Hills, Pennsylvania but in 1983, it closed down. However, they were unable to sell the building and pay their creditors so by order of the U.S. Bankruptcy Court, the Oxford Valley store was reopened in 1984 as a warehouse outlet in order to liquidate remaining stock after the Camden warehouse was shut down. A store in Cherry Hill, New Jersey remained opened after the sale but the company was clearly in major decline.

== Furniture ==
The company produced a wide variety of furniture in contemporary and previous era styles as well as western and eastern styles, and including everything from bed and dining sets to lamps, clocks, rugs, curtains and custom-made draperies. Styles ranged from ornate and oriental to the more simplistic mission and colonial furniture. They even produced their own brand of furniture polish which sold for 45 cents in the 1920s.

== Legacy ==
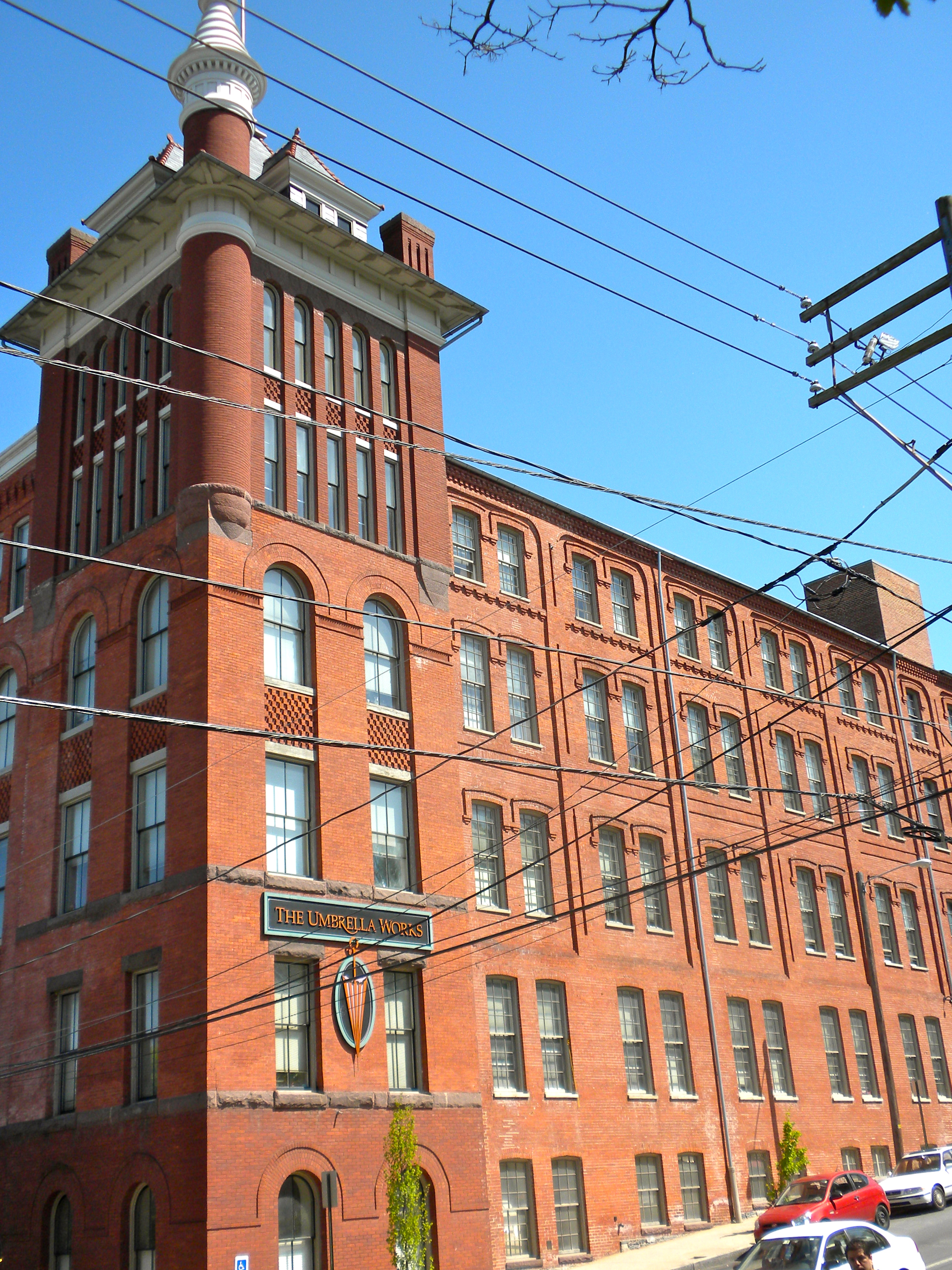
The Lancaster location

The National Register of Historic Places listed the former Lancaster store in 1986. The Van Scivers had owned a 120-acre farm in Haddon Township, New Jersey and as the acreage diminished by the growing development of the area, 9 acres were sold and established for the Van Sciver Elementary School, built in 1957.

Van Sciver Lake near Levittown, Pennsylvania is presumably named after the Van Sciver company, given its proximity to the Van Sciver stores in Trenton and Fairless Hills.
