= Pearl Van Sciver =

American artist

Pearl Jeanette Van Sciver, née Aiman (1896 – October 10, 1966), was a Philadelphia based artist, mostly of oil paintings of landscapes and floral still lifes often inspired by flowers from her own garden and greenhouse. She married Lloyd Van Sciver, the son of notable Camden, New Jersey–based furniture maker, J.B. Van Sciver.

== Early life ==
Pearl was born in Chestnut Hill, Philadelphia, in 1896, the only child of parents Arnold Aiman and Emma G. Rorer. Her father was a roofer and her mother had inherited property and money from her wealthy and heirless uncle, Clinton Rorer. Sometime before Pearl turned 4 years old, her parents moved just outside the city to Wyndmoor, in Springfield Township, Montgomery County. Here she grew up in a large stone house which still stands today on East Willow Grove Ave. Her next door neighbors were the family of her mother's sister, the Fallows. The two families remained very close, Pearl was a bridesmaid at her cousin's wedding and reciprocated by asking the same cousin to be Matron of Honor at her own wedding.

As a child, Pearl attended the Wyndmoor Public School, which is now the Wyndmoor Montessori School. Later, she became a graduate of Steven's School of Germantown, the Pennsylvania Academy of the Fine Arts and the Philadelphia Design for Women, now known as the Moore College of Art and Design.

== Marriage ==
On October 3, 1924, Pearl Aiman married Lloyd Van Sciver, a son of J.B. Van Sciver, owner of a successful furniture company, J.B. Van Sciver Co. Lloyd was a graduate of the Chestnut Hill Academy and School of Industrial Art (now the College of Art, Media and Design at the University of the Arts) and had also spent time in the military, having served overseas during World War I. Sadly, Pearl's mother had not lived long enough to see her marry and had died in 1922. The wedding took place at the Church of St. Martin-in-the-Fields in Chestnut Hill followed by a reception at the Philadelphia Cricket Club.

== Artwork ==
Pearl's life is reflected in her oil paintings of landscapes, street scenes and flowers. Some of her landscapes or street scenes of are local areas around Philadelphia such as New Hope and Lancaster, while others are of some of the many places she traveled to, such as Rothenburg, Germany, Gloucester, England or Kennebunkport, Maine. Her floral paintings were often of flowers that came directly from her own gardens and greenhouse at her residence.

Pearl's work won numerous awards and was displayed in many galleries over the course of her life. Some of her paintings are included in several permanent collections at the Allentown Art Museum, Rochester Memorial Art Gallery, Ogontz Junior College and the University of Pennsylvania.

One of Pearl's paintings of a canal in New Hope was reported as stolen and is listed on the FBI website of stolen art.

The Woodmere Art Museum in Chestnut Hill awards the Pearl & Lloyd Van Sciver Prize to the best work of art by a member of Woodmere.
