= Follmer, Clogg and Company Umbrella Factory =

- U.S. National Register of Historic Places
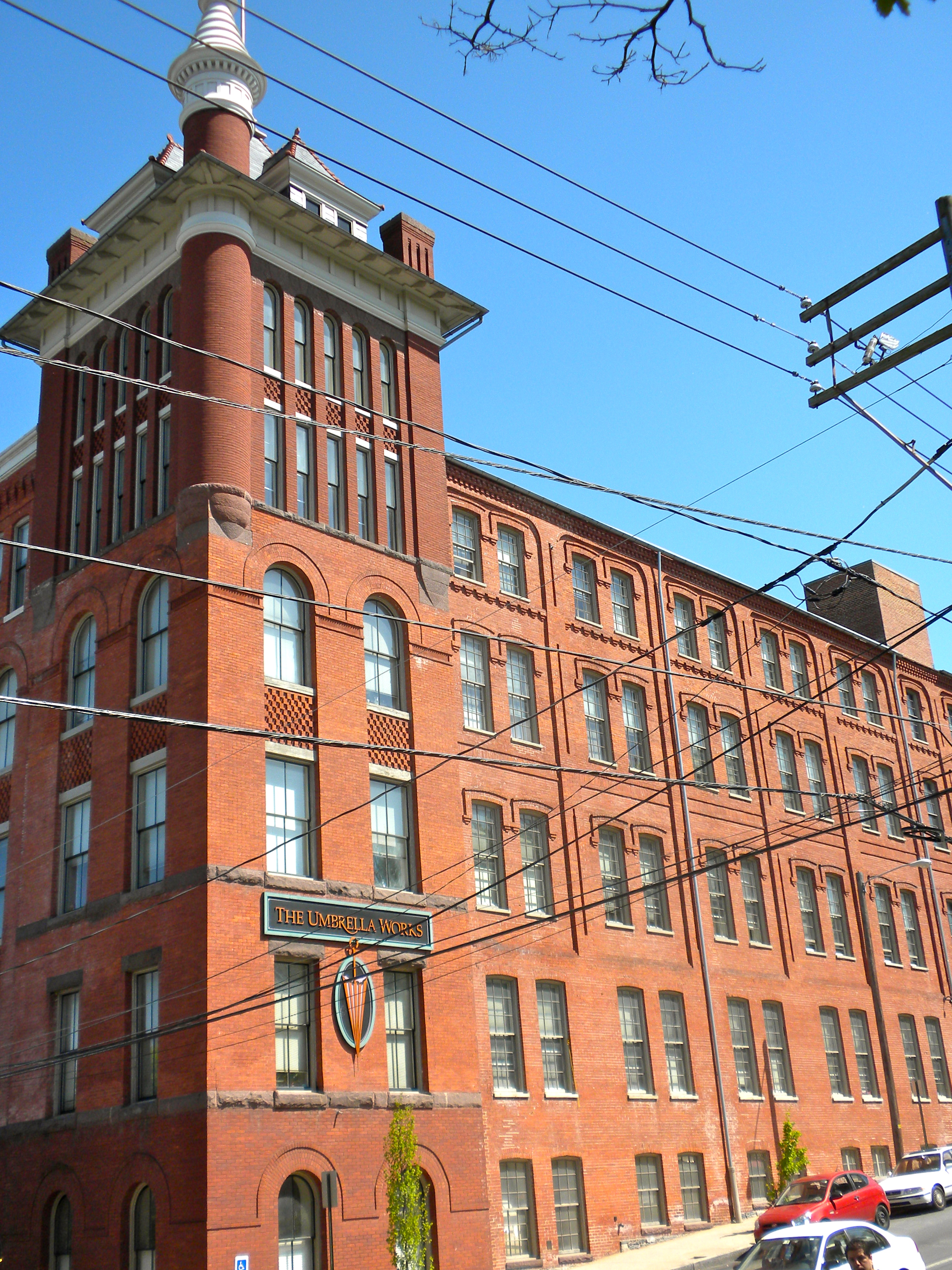
- Follmer, Clogg and Company Umbrella Factory, April 2010

- Location within Pennsylvania Location within the United States
- Location: 254-260 W. King St., Lancaster, Pennsylvania
- Coordinates: 40°2′46″N 76°18′39″W
- Area: 1 acre (0.40 ha)
- Built: c. 1880-c. 1905
- NRHP reference No.: 86001775
- Added to NRHP: August 21, 1986

Follmer, Clogg and Company Umbrella Factory, also known as Van Sciver Building, is a historic factory building located at Lancaster, Lancaster County, Pennsylvania. It was built between about 1880 and 1905, and is a U-shaped, brick complex measuring approximately 144 feet by 250 feet. It housed Follmer, Clogg and Company, a manufacturer of umbrellas and parachutes, until the 1940s. In 1944, it was acquired by J.B. Van Sciver Co. and housed a furniture store, warehouse, and repair shop until 1982.

It was listed on the National Register of Historic Places in 1986.
