= Elizabeth F. Washington =

American painter

Elizabeth Fisher Washington
- Born: 1871; Siegfried's Bridge, Pennsylvania
- Died: 1953 (aged 81–82)
- Known for: Painting

Elizabeth Fisher Washington (1871–1953) was an American portrait and landscape painter.

== Formative years ==
Born in Siegfried's Bridge, Pennsylvania, in the Lehigh Valley, north Bucks County, Elizabeth Fisher Washington was a great-grandniece of George Washington.

She began studying art at the Pennsylvania Museum School of Industrial Art, now the University of the Arts, in Philadelphia, and then studied with Hugh Brekenridge and Fred Wagner at the Pennsylvania Academy of the Fine Arts (PAFA).

At PAFA, she was awarded the William Emlem Cresson Traveling Scholarship in 1912 to study in Europe, the 1913 Toppan Prize, and the 1917 and 1934 Mary Smith Prizes.

Washington painted miniatures and portraits, but she was most interested in depicting the landscape in Philadelphia, Bucks County, and Rockport, Maine. Her studio was located in downtown Philadelphia. Her work was exhibited extensively at venues such as the Corcoran Gallery of Art, Washington, D.C. (1916 and 1923); the Carnegie Institute, Pittsburgh (1920-1922); the National Academy of Design, New York (1930); the Philadelphia Museum of Art; and the Pennsylvania Academy.

In 1949, the Newman Galleries in Philadelphia held a retrospective of her work. Washington's works are in the permanent collections of the Pennsylvania Academy of the Fine Arts, the Springville Museum of Art (Utah), and the Telfair Museum of Art (Georgia).

Washington was a member of the Philadelphia Art Alliance, North Shore Art Association, Pennsylvania Society of Miniature Painters, the Plastic Club, and the Fellowship of the Pennsylvania Academy of the Fine Arts.
