= Françoise Folmer =

Architect and politician from Luxembourg

Françoise Folmer (born 6 January 1961 in Esch-sur-Alzette) is a Luxembourgish architect and politician. She was named Woman Business Manager of the Year for 2011 by the Banque Internationale à Luxembourg.

In March 2015, she became leader of The Greens. She quit this position in June 2018 to preserve her privacy.
