= Luxembourg Athletics Federation =

Sports national governing body

- Sport: Athletics
- Abbreviation: FLA
- Founded: 1928
- Affiliation: World Athletics
- Regional affiliation: EAA and AASSE
- Headquarters: Strassen, Luxembourg
- President: Stéphanie Empain
- Secretary: Richard Anner

Official website
- www.fla.lu
- (Luxembourg)

The Luxembourg Athletics Federation (French: Fédération Luxembourgeoise d’Athlétisme), abbreviated to FLA, is the governing body for the sport of athletics in Luxembourg. It was founded on 11 November 1928, replacing the Federation of Luxembourgish Athletic Sports Societies (French: Fédération des Sociétés Luxembourgeoises des Sports Athlétiques).

== List of presidents ==
- Edmond Marx (1928–1940)
- Alex Servais (1945–1947)
- Jos Lucius (1947–1958)
- Pierre Wies (1958)
- Jos Lucius (1959)
- Emile Goebel (1960–1961)
- François Mersch (1961–1962)
- Josy Barthel (1962–1972)
- Norbert Haupert (1973–1979)
- Mil Jung (1980–1989)
- Jean-Marie Janssen (1991–2000)
- Alex Bodry (2001 – 2010)
- Claude Haagen (2010–2018)
- Stéphanie Empain (2018–present)

== See also ==
- List of athletics clubs in Luxembourg
