= Luxembourg at the 2010 European Athletics Championships =

Sporting event delegation

Luxembourg will be represented by 1 athlete at the 2010 European Athletics Championships held in Barcelona, Spain.

== Participants ==
Event	Men	Women
800 m	Christophe Bestgen	

== Results ==
2010 Barcelona	Gold	Silver	Bronze	Total
Luxembourg (LUX)	0	0	0	0
