= Luxembourg at the 2012 European Athletics Championships =

Luxembourg competed at the 2012 European Athletics Championships held in Helsinki, Finland, between 27 June to 1 July 2012. 4 competitors, 3 men and 1 woman took part in 4 events.

== Results ==
=== Men ===
Track events

Event	Athletes	Heat		Semifinal		Final	
Event	Athletes	Result	Rank	Result	Rank	Result	Rank
800 m	Charel Grethen	1:53.22	35	did not advance			
1500 m	David Karonei	3:50.93	26	—		did not advance	
400 m hurdles	Jacques Frisch	51.59	26	did not advance			

=== Women ===
Field events

Event	Athletes	Qualification		Final	
Event	Athletes	Result	Rank	Result	Rank
Pole vault	Gina Reuland	3.80	28	did not advance	
