= The Thinker: Portrait of Louis N. Kenton =

1900 painting by Thomas Eakins

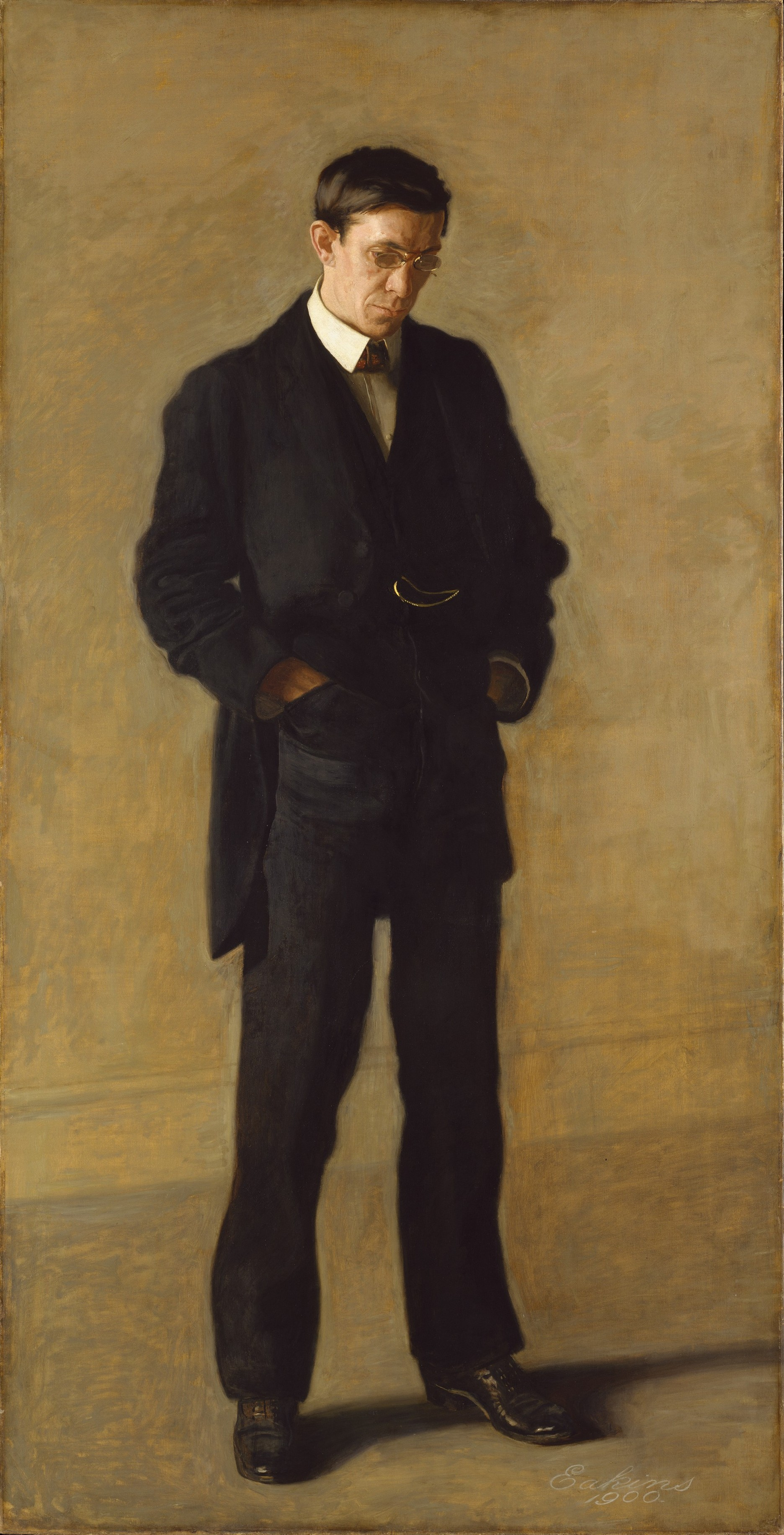
- Artist: Thomas Eakins
- Year: 1900
- Medium: Oil on canvas
- Dimensions: 210 cm × 110 cm (82 in × 42 in)
- Location: Metropolitan Museum of Art, New York

The Thinker: Portrait of Louis N. Kenton is an oil painting of 1900 by the American artist Thomas Eakins. It is a depiction of the artist's brother-in-law, Louis N. Kenton (1865-1947), and it has been called "one of Eakins's most memorable portraits". The painting is one of a series of life size standing male portraits painted late in Eakins's career.

== Background ==
Louis Kenton was the son of a flour and grain salesman from Philadelphia. Although little is known about his life, he was listed as a bookkeeper and clerk in that city's directories between 1889 and 1891. He is described in literature on the artist as Eakins's friend, and posed for a background figure in the 1898 painting Salutat. Kenton married Eakins's sister-in-law, Elizabeth Macdowell, on May 31, 1899. Eakins gave the painting to his sister-in-law by 1901, so it may well have been intended as a marriage portrait. The marriage was brief and not happy, with notes from Susan Macdowell Eakins's diaries indicating that Kenton was physically violent.

== Description ==
Of Eakins's full-length portraits, the subject of The Thinker: Portrait of Louis N. Kenton is the least well-known: "Among Eakins's scholars and thinkers, he may be the lone representative of the working class." The painting is the sparest in presentation; it has no discernible narrative, nor do the setting or costume provide overt dramatic potential. Kenton stands at the center of the composition, looking down and inward, his hands thrust in his pockets. His casual and introspective pose sets a tone consistent with many of Eakins's paintings of people, in that it references and subsequently rejects the conventions of aristocratic portraiture. With its contrast of the figure's dark silhouette and light, nondescript background, the painting suggests the influence of Velázquez. For Eakins's biographer Lloyd Goodrich the similarities extend to the naturalistic verisimilitude and stylistic austerity of both artists' conceptions. Admiration for Velázquez's virtuosity and restrained palette, shared by contemporaries such as Manet, John Singer Sargent and William Merritt Chase, is moderated in The Thinker by Eakins's adherence to his academic training, particularly apparent in the precise details of anatomy and dress.

Although the dark passages of Kenton's figure are broadly painted and the contours of the suit blurred to suggest atmosphere, details like his head, watch chain and shoes are depicted with careful attention to their three-dimensional quality. This contrast of technique may have been intended to emphasize the solidly sculptural presence of the head. Furthering this impression is the delicate coloring of Kenton's face, seen against the hard edge of his starched white collar. The portrait has been seen as subliminally autobiographical for its emphasis on intellectual solitude, and as a realization of Eakins's desire to construct a "modern, middle-class American life layered over the grand European tradition." Eakins's original title for the painting referred solely to the subject's name, emphasizing his individuality; it was only after the artist's death that The Thinker was added, in effect conferring a more abstracted and generic characterization to the painting, as with other of his large portraits like The Archaeologist and The Cello Player. The addition to the title derived from an inscription, most likely written by Mrs. Eakins, on the painting's stretcher, and may have been prompted by Kenton's estrangement from the Eakins family.

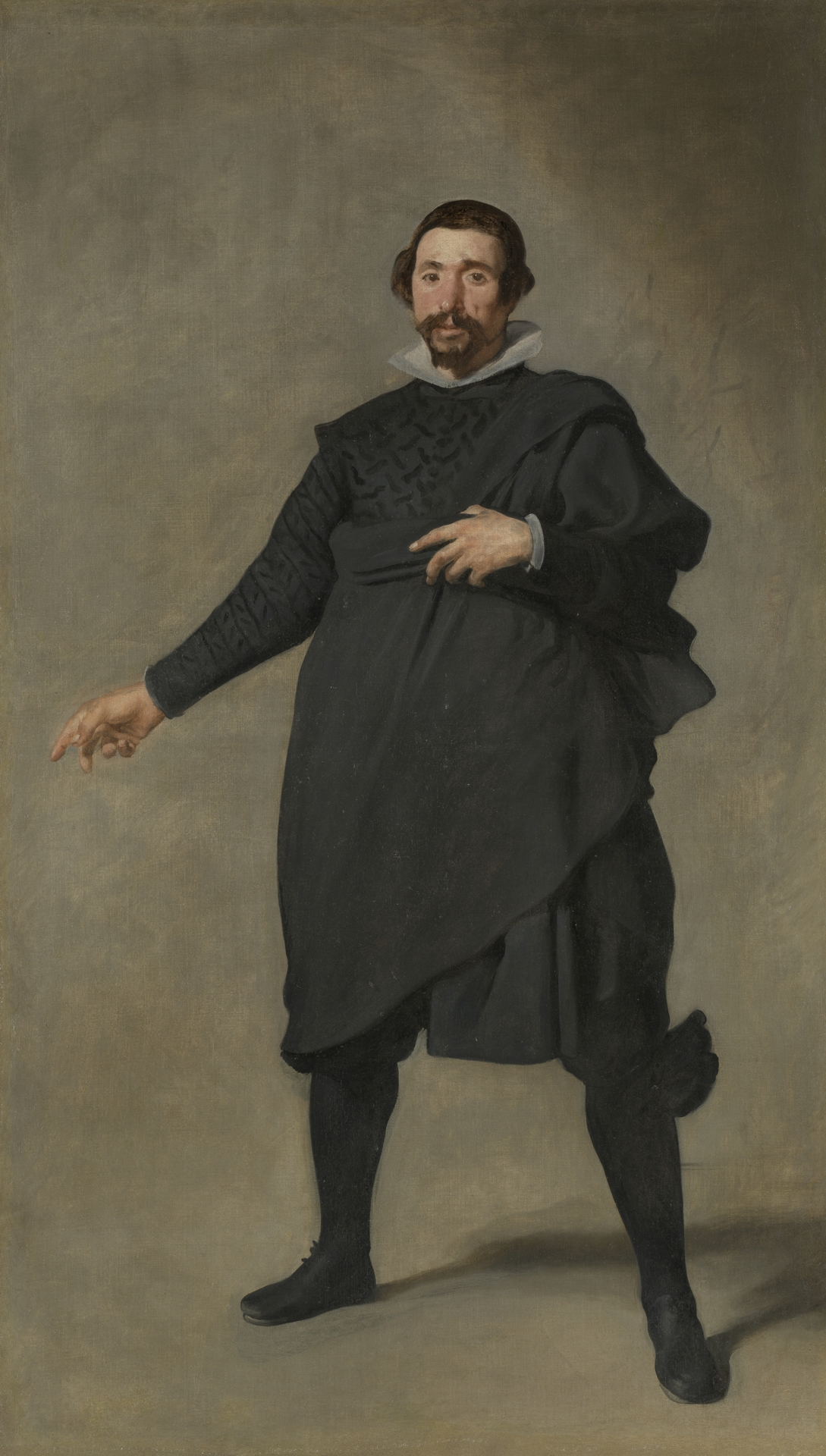
Diego Velázquez, Portrait of Pablo de Valladolid, 1636–37, Museo del Prado. Especially in terms of tone and color, Lloyd Goodrich noted similarities between Eakins's painting and Velázquez's portrait of a court jester.

== Reception ==
Between 1900 and 1916 Eakins exhibited the painting at least thirteen times, including at major venues such as the Carnegie Institute's Annual Exhibition in 1900–1901, the Pennsylvania Academy's Annual and the Pan-American Exposition in Buffalo. Unusually so for an Eakins portrait, The Thinker: Portrait of Louis N. Kenton received notice soon after it was painted. The figure's baggy suit and informal demeanor led early admirers to describe both the figure and the painting as ugly and awkward. On several occasions Charles Henry Caffin wrote admiringly of the painting, making what was at that time novel reference in American art criticism to the image's psychological, rather than pictorial or anecdotal, characteristics. Caffin wrote that "the very crudity of the realism is in the highest degree impressive....The subject, indeed, has been surprised as he is pacing the floor, deep in some mental abstraction; he seems utterly unaware of the painter's presence, and the latter has forgotten himself in his absorption in the subject."

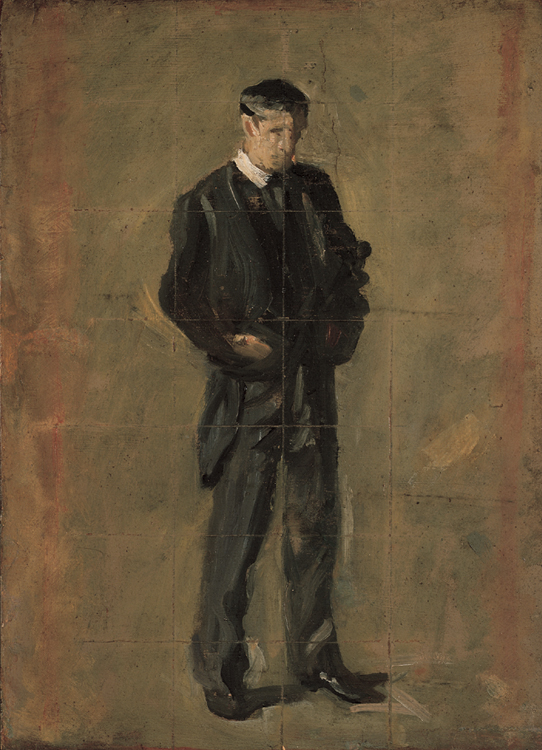
Study for "The Thinker", Farnsworth Art Museum, Rockland, Maine

Reviewing the memorial exhibition of Eakins's work at the Metropolitan Museum of Art in 1917, art critic Henry McBride singled out The Thinker: Portrait of Louis N. Kenton as "the most restrained, most classical of all the Eakins canvases." The Metropolitan Museum purchased the painting later that year.

A small oil study for the portrait is in the collection of the Farnsworth Art Museum. It is similar to the finished painting, except for the elongation of the shadows on the floor, the introduction of a wall behind Kenton, and the addition of his eyeglasses. The loose and energetic handling of the study was eliminated in the large painting.

== In popular culture ==
The painting is a particular favorite of Vincent Smith, a character in Emily St. John Mandel's 2020 novel The Glass Hotel, who is named after the poet Edna St. Vincent Millay.

The painting was later used as the cover for the New York Review Books edition of the John Williams novel Stoner.

== See also ==
- List of works by Thomas Eakins
