= Woman Reading (Susan Macdowell Eakins) =

Painting by Susan Macdowell Eakins

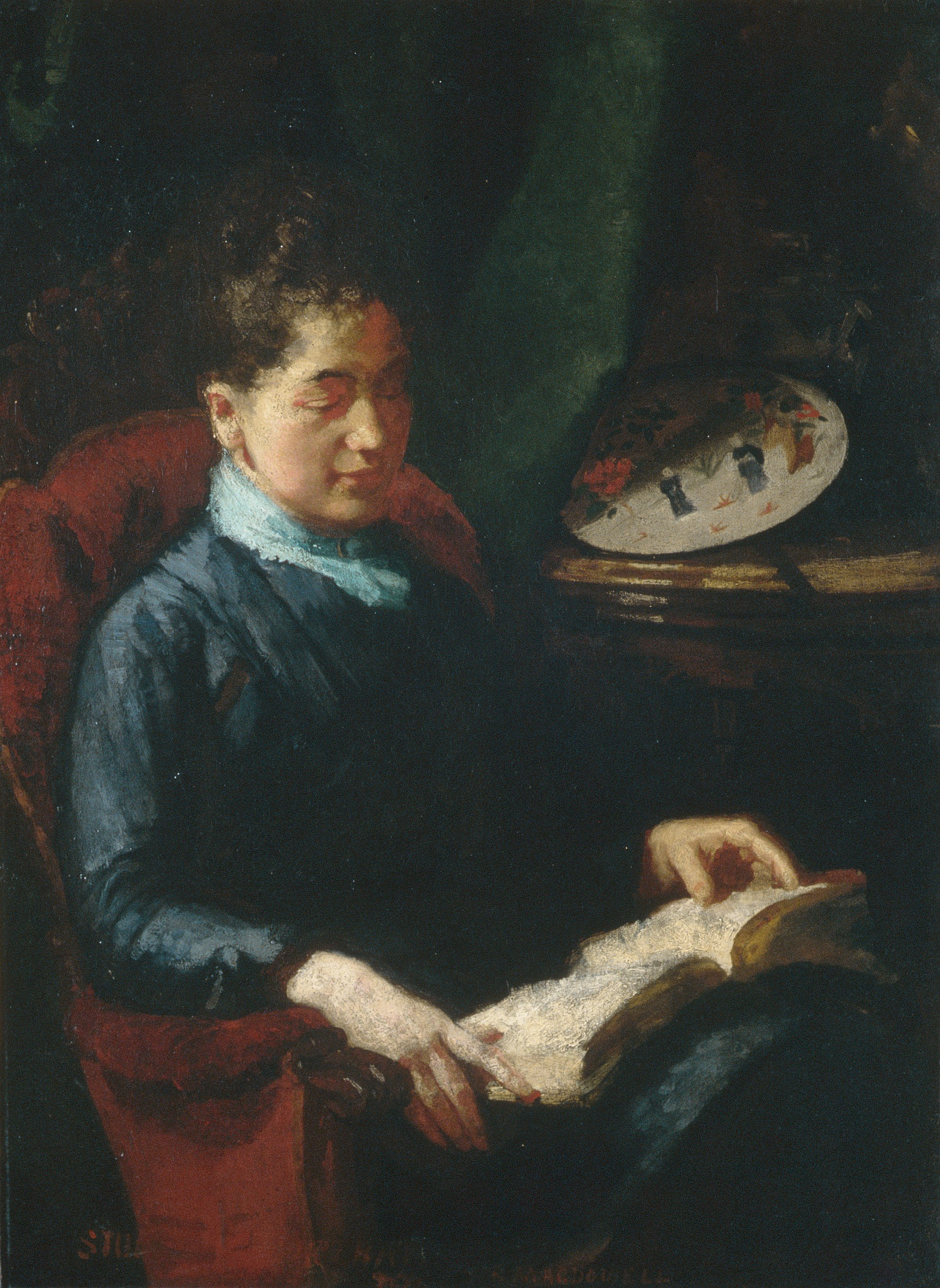
- Artist: Susan Macdowell Eakins
- Year: 19th century
- Medium: oil paint, canvas
- Dimensions: 96.5 cm (38.0 in) × 71.1 cm (28.0 in)
- Location: Metropolitan Museum of Art
- Accession: 1995.27

Woman Reading is a 19th-century (portrait painting) by Susan Macdowell Eakins. It is in the collection of the Metropolitan Museum of Art.

Woman Reading probably depicts the artist's sister Elizabeth Macdowell Kenton. It is one of Eakins' many portraits of her family members in interior settings. It was in the collection of Julius Rauzin, who donated it in 1995. Julius Rauzin knew Susan Macdowell Eakins and her sister Elizabeth, and corresponded with them regularly for many years.
