= Randall Stout =

American architect

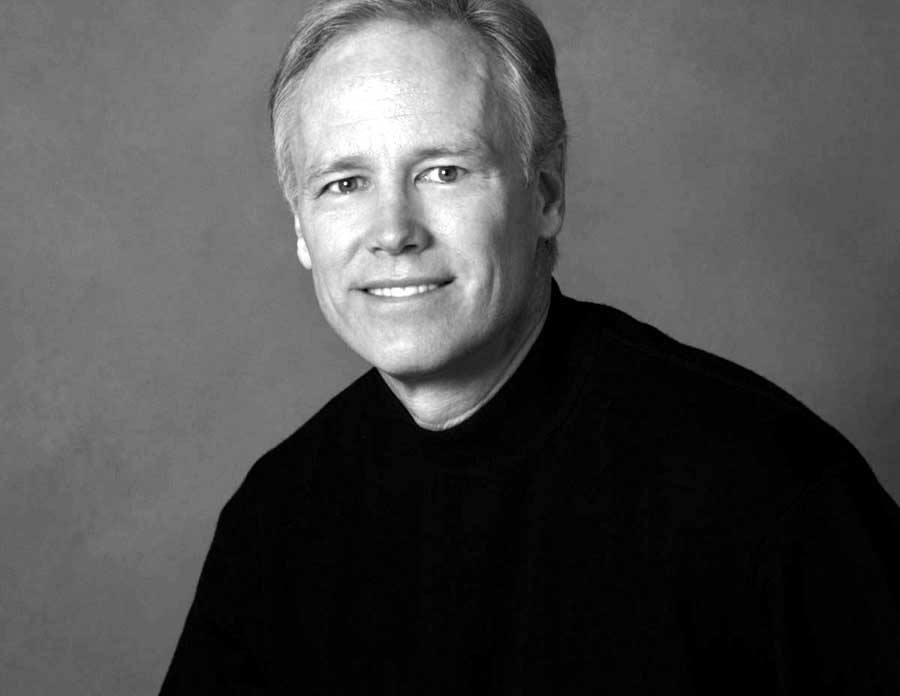
- Randall Stout in 2011
- Born: May 6, 1958; Knoxville, Tennessee, U.S.
- Died: July 11, 2014 (aged 56); Los Angeles, California, U.S.
- Occupation: Architect
- Practice: Randall Stout Architects, Inc.
- Buildings: Taubman Museum of Art, Hunter Museum of American Art, Art Gallery of Alberta, Abroms-Engel Institute for the Visual Arts

Randall Paul Stout (May 6, 1958 – July 11, 2014) was an American architect based in Los Angeles. He was an environmentally sensitive architect who earned a national reputation by designing dynamically shaped forms that are inviting and artistic without being static. Stout used light, shadow, form, and materials that contributed to shaping an architecture that heightens awareness of space and a sense of discovery. He applied his concepts to civic, educational, commercial, and urban planning projects, but was best known for regional museums.

== Early life and education ==
Born and raised in Tennessee, Stout held a Bachelor of Architecture from the University of Tennessee and a Master of Architecture from Rice University.

== Career ==
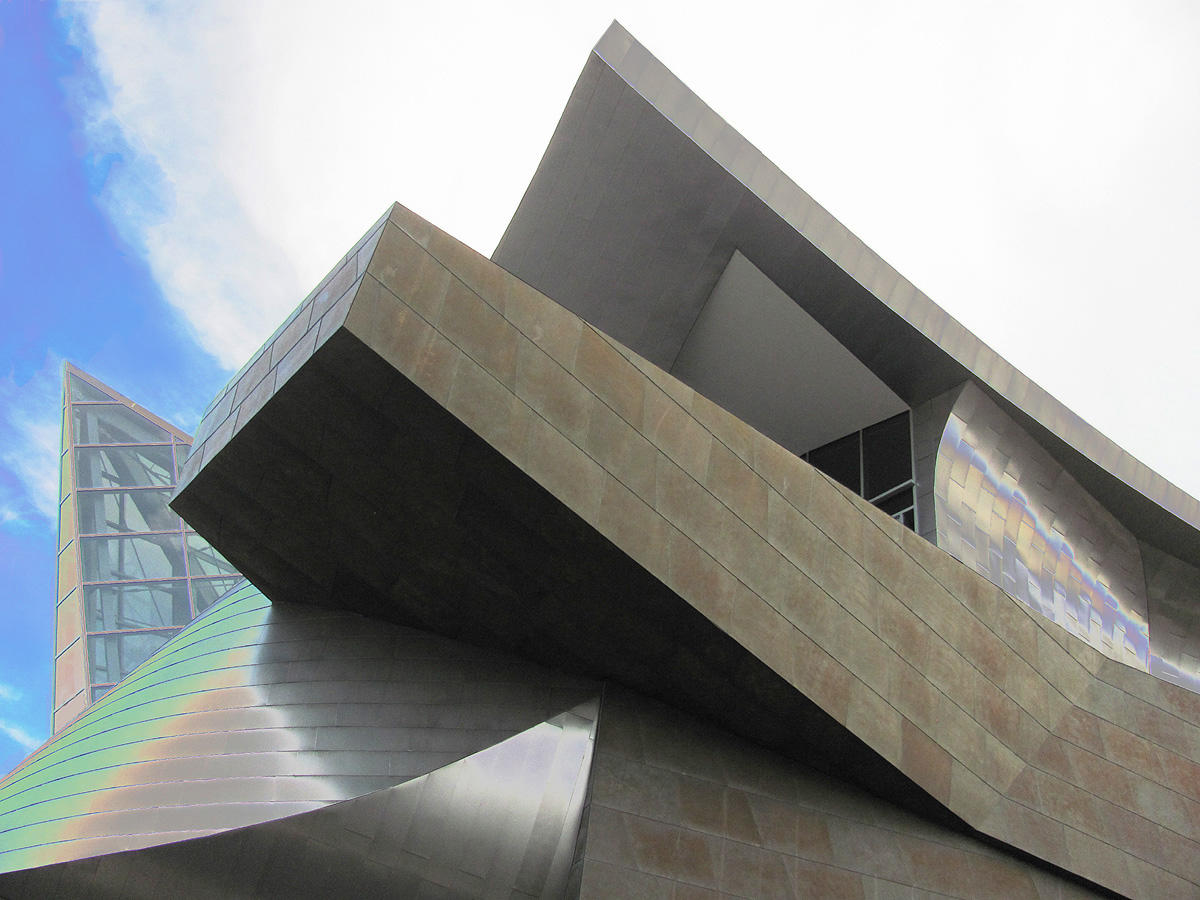
Taubman Museum of Art, Roanoke, Virginia, United States (2008)

Before starting his own firm, Stout worked four years at Skidmore, Owings and Merrill, and seven and a half years for Frank O. Gehry & Associates. He started his firm with a series of internationally admired commissions in Germany, including the Steinhude Sea Recreational Facility, Bünde Fire Station, North Minden Power Plant, Rehem Water Station, and Melittabad Aquatics Facility. The projects were often built on tight budgets using inexpensive, energy smart materials. In America, he specialized in cultural projects, especially midsize museums, including the Taubman Museum of Art, the Hunter Museum of American Art, the Art Gallery of Alberta, and the Abroms-Engel Institute for the Visual Arts. At the time of his death, he was also an associate professor of architecture at the University of Nevada, Las Vegas.

== Completed Works ==
=== Taubman Museum of Art, Roanoke Virginia, United States (2008) ===
Stout received a 2007 American Architecture Award and a 2009 International Architecture Award from the Chicago Athenaeum for his design of the Taubman Museum of Art. The forms and materials selected for the building were chosen to pay homage to the famed Blue Ridge and Appalachian Mountain surroundings. The 77 foot tall glass atrium peak evokes the iconic Roanoke Star and the use of Hokie Stone is emblematic of the architecture of nearby Virginia Polytechnic Institute and State University. In 2018, Architectural Digest named the Taubman Museum of Art the best designed museum in Virginia.

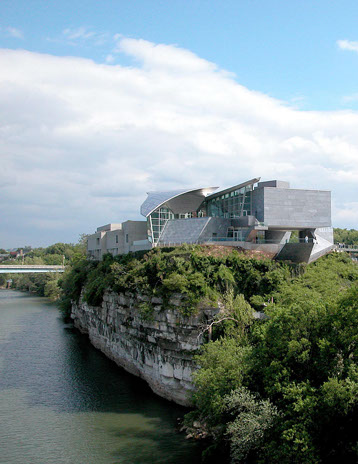
Hunter Museum of American Art, Chattanooga, Tennessee, United States (2005)

=== Hunter Museum of American Art, Chattanooga Tennessee, United States (2005) ===
Stout received a 2004 American Architecture Award from the Chicago Athenaeum for his design of a major addition to the Hunter Museum of American Art. Stout designed the building with forms and lines that seem to emerge out of the limestone bluff as it rises above the river. Inside, he created a dialogue between destination and circulation spaces that meet in a soaring lobby which converge to form a remarkable piece of architectural sculpture "that is as beautiful as any artwork in the museum."

=== Art Gallery of Alberta, Edmonton Alberta, Canada (2010) ===
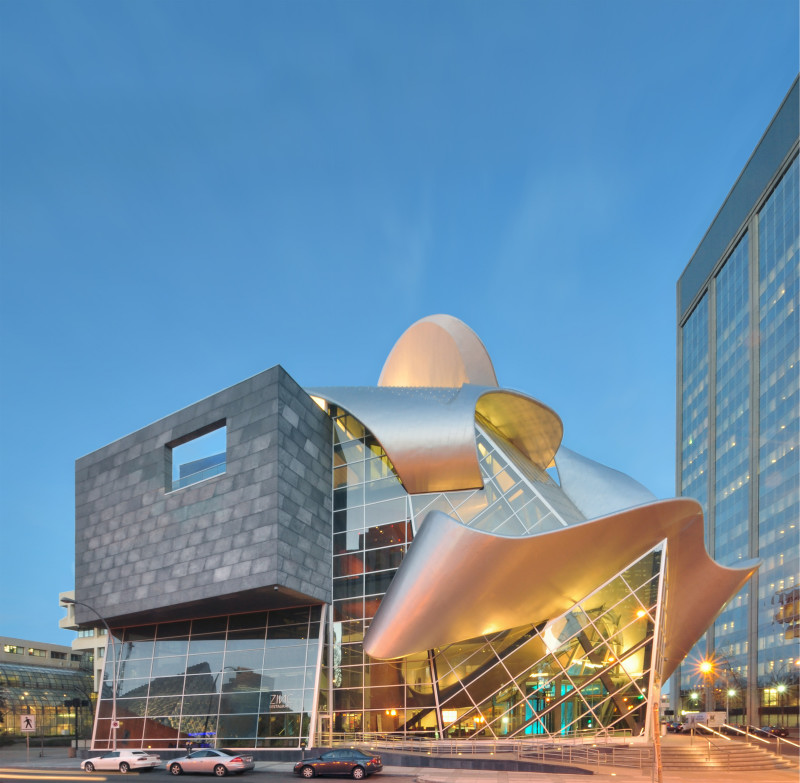
Art Gallery of Alberta, Edmonton, Alberta, Canada (2010)

Stout received a 2012 American Architecture Award from the Chicago Athenaeum for his design of the Art Gallery of Alberta. The building is constructed with patinated zinc and stainless steel. An iconic stainless steel ribbon twists upon itself like a mobius strip as it goes into and through transparent walls. The complex curvilinear form evokes themes of Edmonton's environment including the Edmonton River and the aurora borealis and is intended to "articulate the gallery's commitment to contemporary art."

=== Other completed works ===
- Steinhüde Sea Recreational Facility, Steinhüde, Germany
- Bünde Fire Station, Germany
- North Minden Power Plant, North Minden, Germany
- Rehme Water Station, Rehme, Germany
- Melittabad Aquatics Facility, Minden, Germany
- Stadtwerke Bückeburg, Bückeburg, Germany (1998)
- Abroms-Engel Institute for the Visual Arts, University of Alabama at Birmingham, Birmingham, Alabama (2014)
- Dockweiler Youth Center, Vista Del Mar, California, United States

== Bibliography ==
- Stout, Randall (2004). Architectural Alchemy: Randall Stout Architects (Hardcover). Edizioni Press. ISBN 978-1-931536-22-6
- Stout, Randall, Joh Coddington, and July L. Larson (2010). Design Peak: Randall Stout. Equal Books ISBN 978-89-962904-7-6
- Mathewson, Casey (2010). a5 Architecture, Interiors, Lifestyle (Hardcover). ORO Editions. p. 312. ISBN 978-0-9819857-1-8
- Burtynsky, Edward (2011). Art Gallery of Alberta: Randall Stout Architects (Hardcover), Art Gallery of Alberta. ISBN 978-0-88950-152-2
- La Due, Holly (2013). A New Sculpturalism: Contemporary Architecture from Southern California. p. 132. Skira Rizzoli Publications in association with The Museum of Contemporary Art, Los Angeles. ISBN 978-0-8478-4011-3
- van Uffelen, Chris (2014). The Book of Drawings+Sketches Architecture (Hardcover). p. 330.Braun Publishing AG. ISBN 978-3-03768-150-3

== Awards ==
Stout was elected to the College of Fellows of the American Institute of Architects (AIA) in 2003, and he received many national, regional and local AIA awards.

- The Chicago Athenaeum; 2012 American Architecture Award; Art Gallery of Alberta
- University of Nevada Las Vegas; 2012 Charles Vanda Award for Excellence in the Arts
- CISC Canadian National Steel Design Award for the Alberta Art Gallery; June 2012 2012
- Canadian Institute of Steel Construction; 2011 Steel Design Award of Excellence: Art Gallery of Alberta
- Metal Architecture Design Awards; Grand Award 2011: Art Gallery of Alberta
- Metal Mag Architectural Award 2011: Art Gallery of Alberta
- MCA President’s Award for Excellence 2010: Art Gallery of Alberta
- Institutional Winner, Alberta Construction Magazine 2009 Top Projects: Art Gallery of Alberta
- International Architecture Award (Chicago Athenaeum) 2009: Taubman Museum of Art
- Los Angeles Cultural Affairs Commission Award 2008: Dockweiler State Beach Youth Center
- Mid-Atlantic Construction Best of 2008 Award: Taubman Museum of Art
- American Architecture Award (Chicago Athenaeum) 2007: Taubman Museum of Art
- American Institute of Steel Construction Innovative Design in Structural Steel (IDEAS2) 2006: Hunter Museum of American Art
- AIA/LA Decade Honor Award 2006: Steinhüde Sea Recreational Facility
- AIA Gulf States Merit Award 2006: Hunter Museum of American Art
- Archizinc Prix Special Du Jury “Audace” Laureat / Special Jury Prize for Innovation 2006: Hunter Museum of American Art
- Tennessee AIA Award of Excellence 2005: Hunter Museum of American Art
- Metal Architecture Design Award 2005: Hunter Museum of American Art
- American Architecture Award (Chicago Athenaeum) 2004: Hunter Museum of American Art
- Wood Design and Building Honor Award 2004: Cognito Films
- AIA Top Ten Green Award 2003: Steinhüde Sea Recreational Facility
- AIA/LA Design Citation Award 2003: Steinhüde Sea Recreational Facility
- California Council AIA Merit Award 2003: Cognito Films
- California Council AIA Merit Award 2002: Blair Graphics
- AIA/LA Merit Award 2001: Cognito Films
- AIA/LA Honor Award 2000: Blair Graphics
- AIA/LA Design Citation Award 2000: Rehme Water Station
- Expo 2000 Tour: Four projects sanctioned by Expo for "Energy + Environment Boulevard"
- AIA/LA Next LA Honor Award 1998: Steinhüde Sea Recreational Facility
- AIA/LA Merit Award 1998: North Minden Power Plant
- SOLTEC 98 Award "Innovation in Technology": Steinhüde Sea Recreational Facility

== Death ==
Stout died of renal cell cancer on July 11, 2014, in Los Angeles. He was 56.

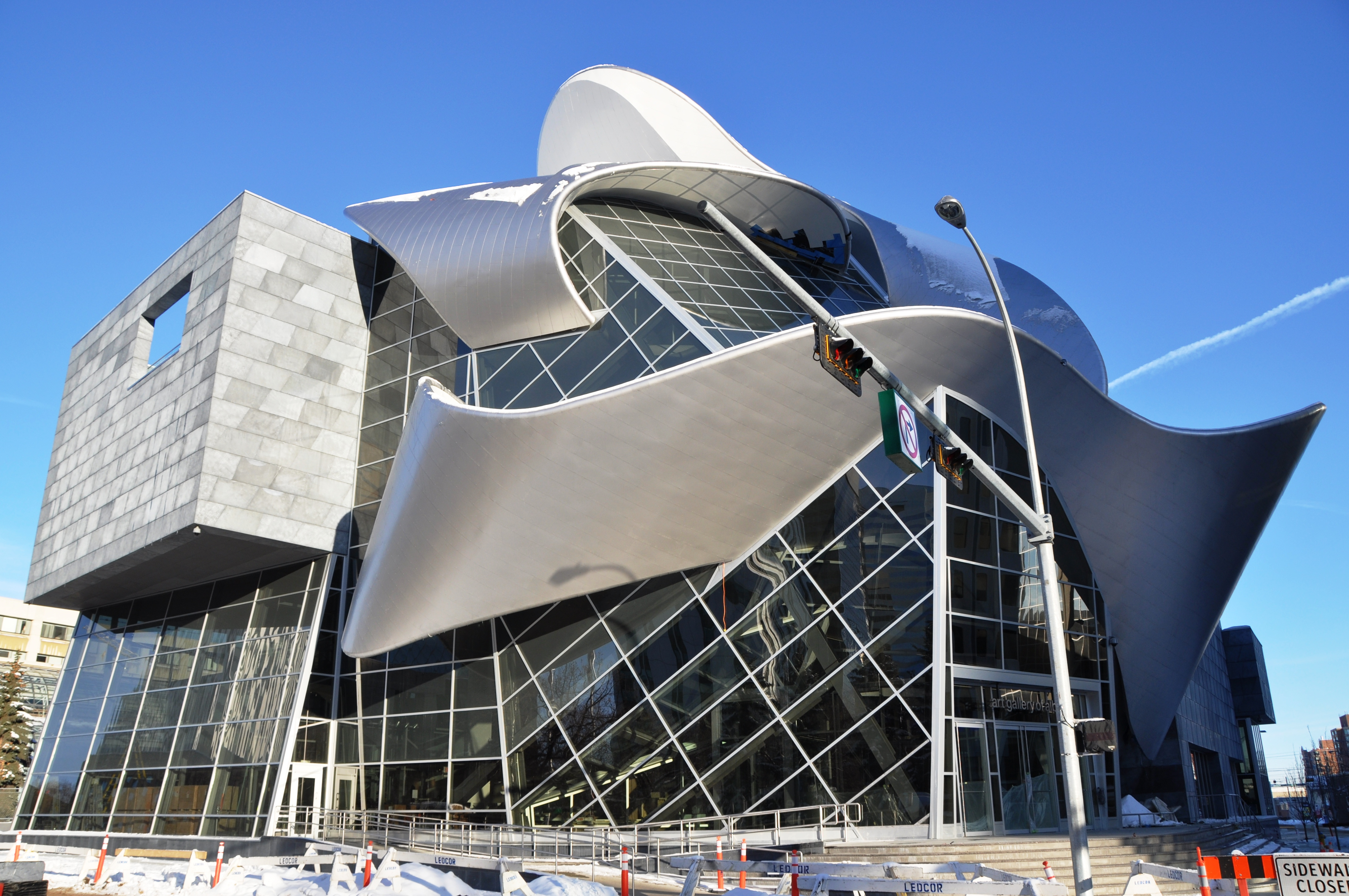
Art Gallery of Alberta, Edmonton, Alberta, Canada (2010)
