= Elizabeth Macdowell Kenton =

American painter

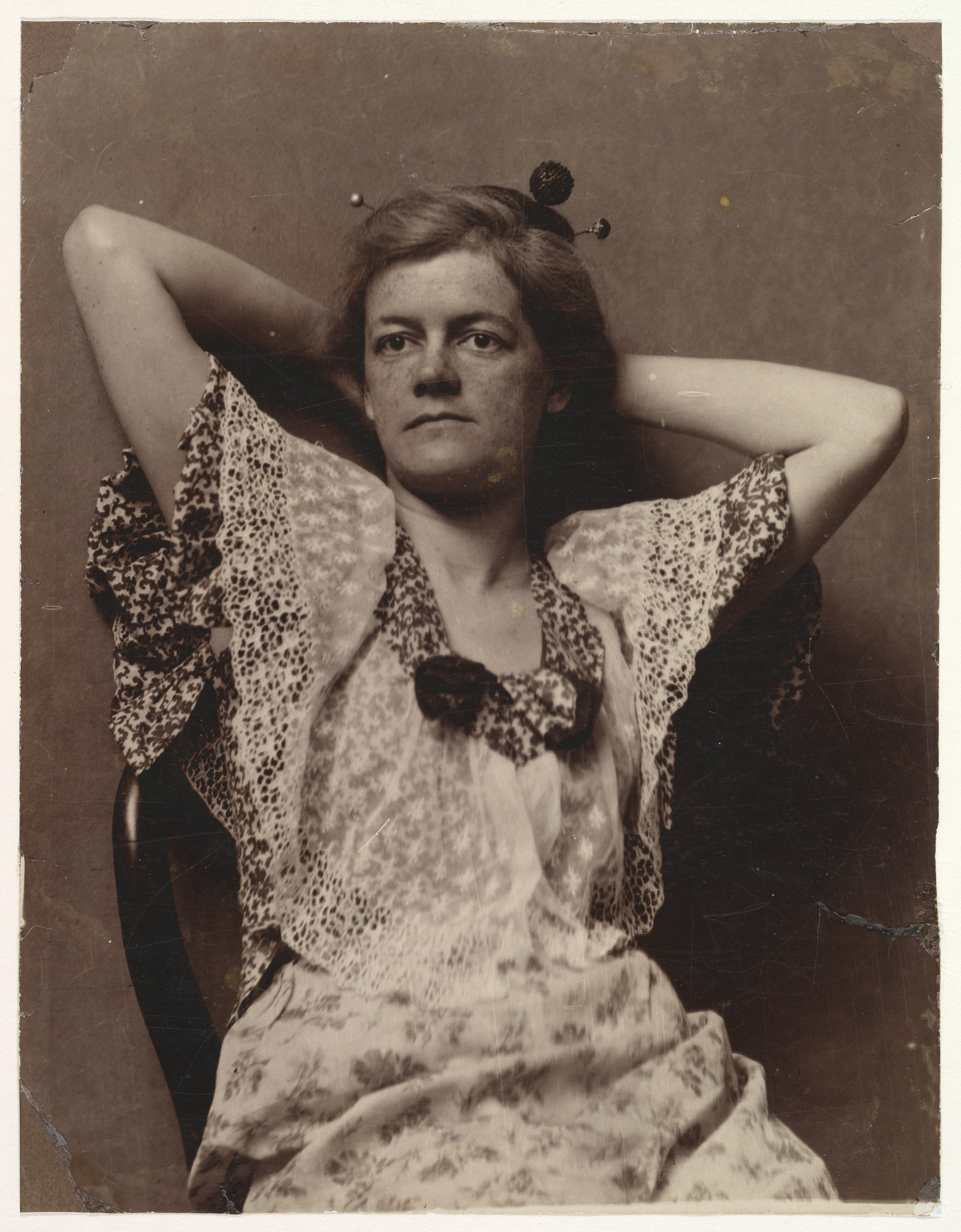
- Kenton's photograph taken by Thomas Eakins
- Born: Elizabeth Macdowell; June 10, 1858; Philadelphia, Pennsylvania
- Died: February 15, 1953 (aged 94); Roanoke, Virginia
- Resting place: Woodlands Cemetery, Philadelphia, Pennsylvania
- Known for: Painting, photography
- Spouse: Louis N. Kenton

Elizabeth Macdowell Kenton (1858–1953) was an American artist known for her figure paintings and portraits. She was also a photographer.

== Early life ==
She was one of the eight children of Hannah Gardner and William Hance Macdowell, a Philadelphia engraver, photographer, and a skilled painter. He passed on his interest in Thomas Paine and freethought to his three sons and five daughters.

Elizabeth and her sister Susan each displayed an early interest in art, which was encouraged by their father. They both studied at the Pennsylvania Academy of the Fine Arts under Thomas Eakins, and Susan married Eakins in January 1884. Eakins painted portraits of several of the Macdowells, and used them as models in photographs.

Day Dreams: Portrait of Caroline Eakins, Elizabeth's portrait of Susan's sister-in-law, was exhibited at the 1893 World's Columbian Exposition in Chicago. It eventually found a home in the Taubman Museum of Art in Roanoke, Virginia, while many of her other works can be found in private collections.

Elizabeth Macdowell married Louis N. Kenton (1865–1947) on May 31, 1899. Thomas Eakins painted a portrait of him, The Thinker (1900), now at the Metropolitan Museum of Art. The Kentons' marriage was brief and not happy, with notes from Susan's diaries indicating that he was physically violent.

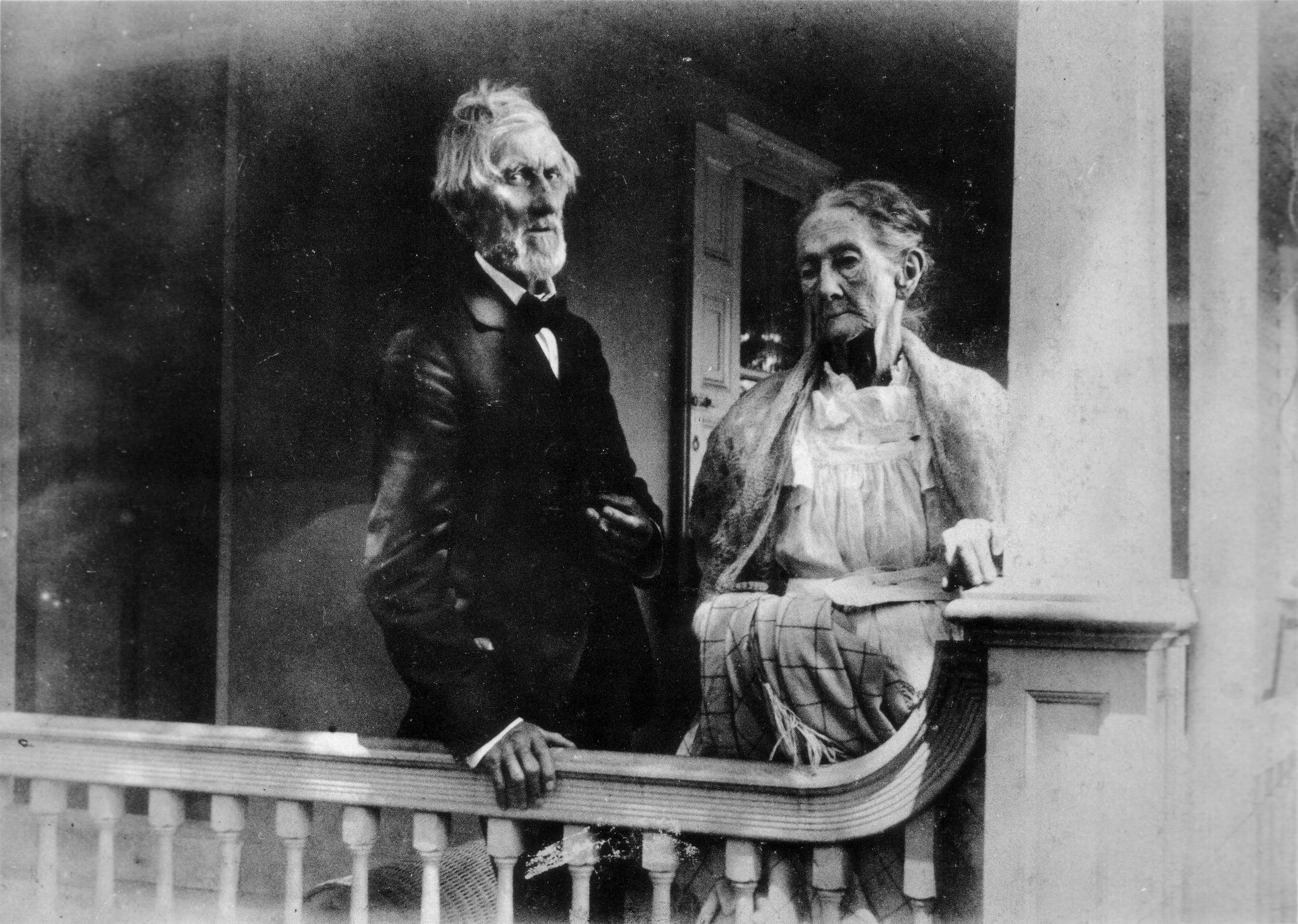
Parents: William & Hannah Macdowell

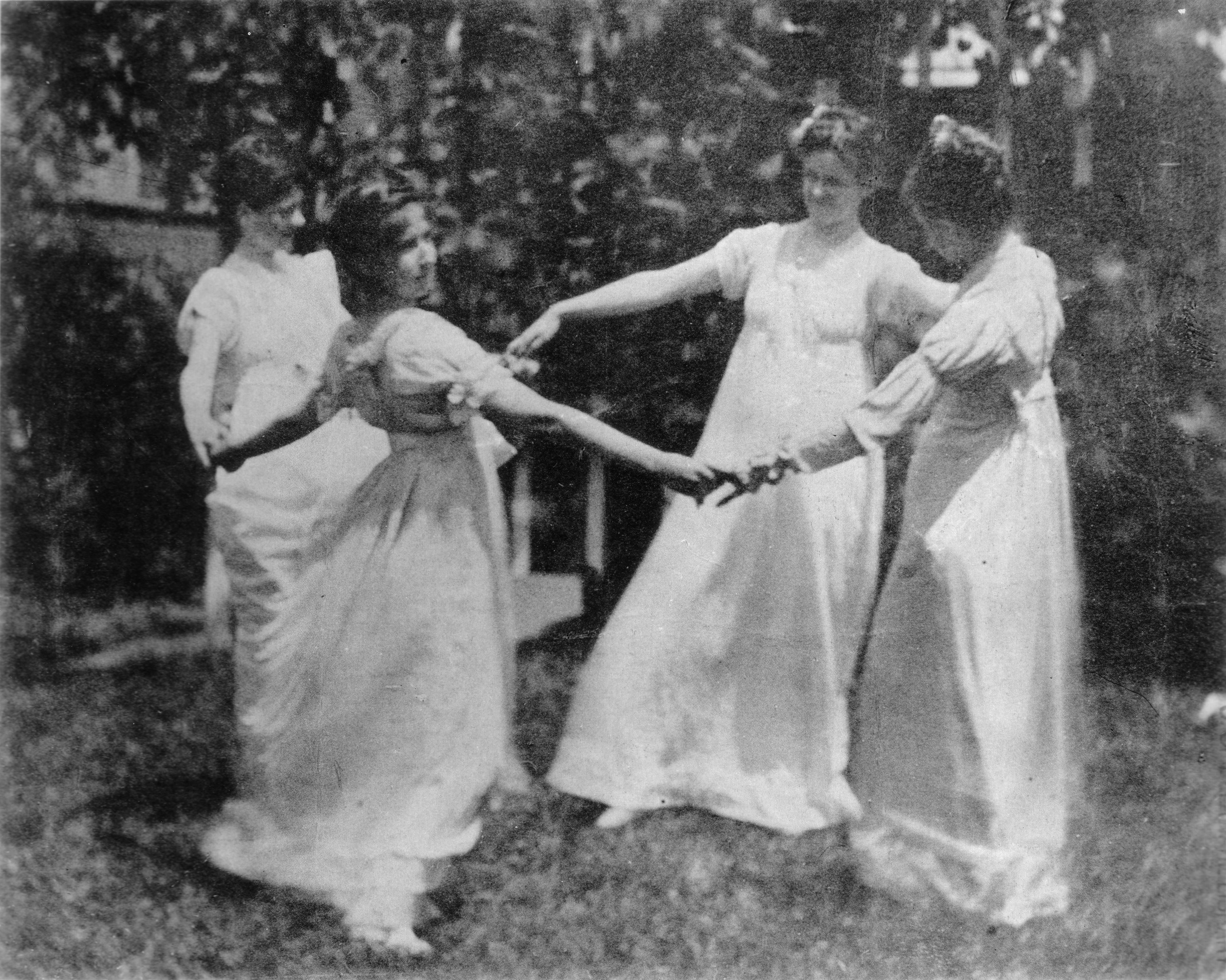
Kenton (2nd from r) with her sisters

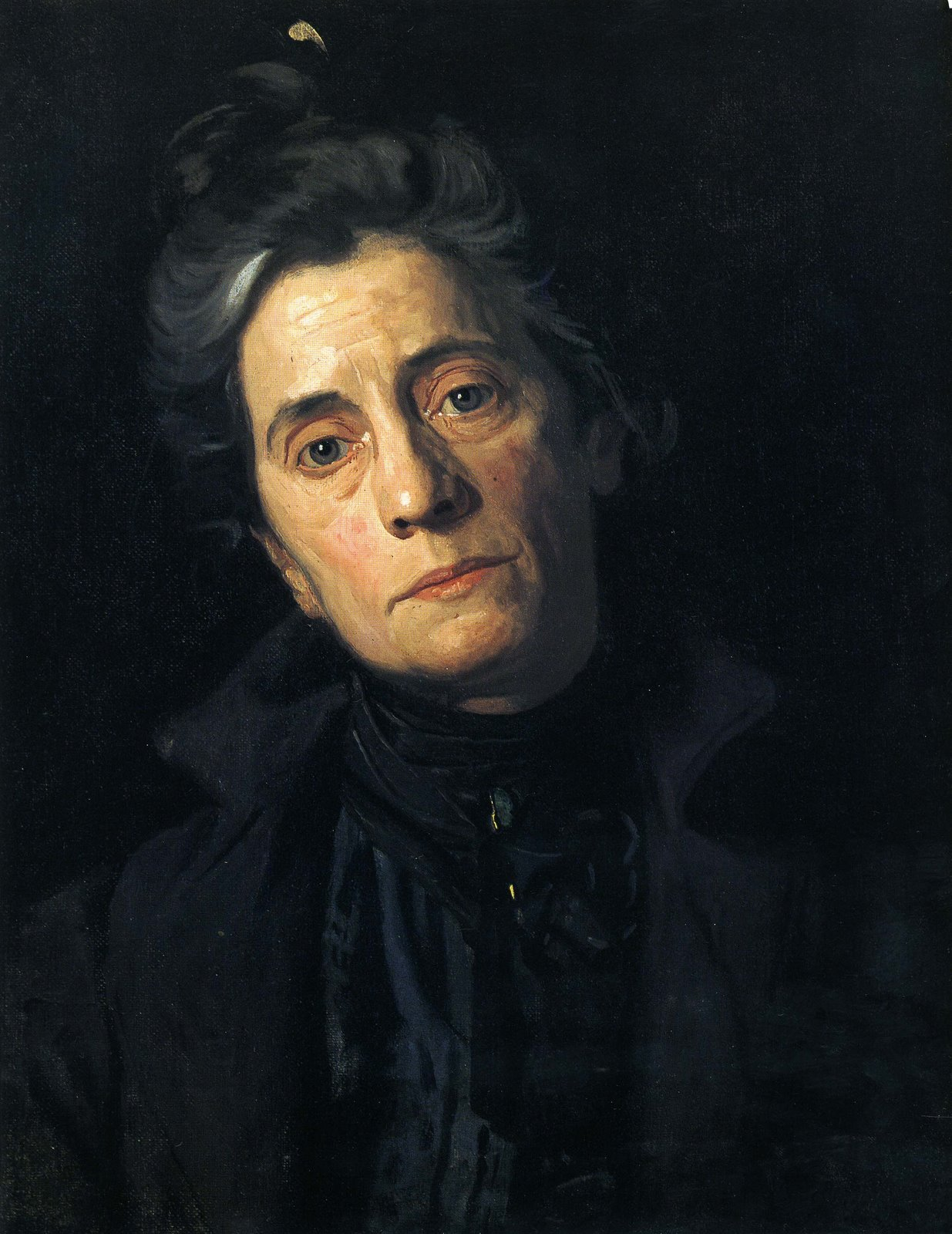
Sister: Susan Macdowell Eakins

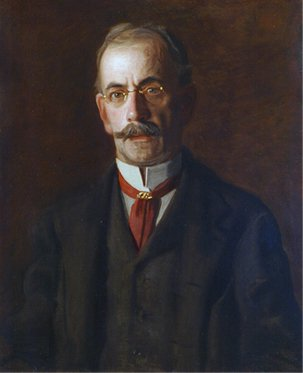
Brother: Walter S. Macdowell

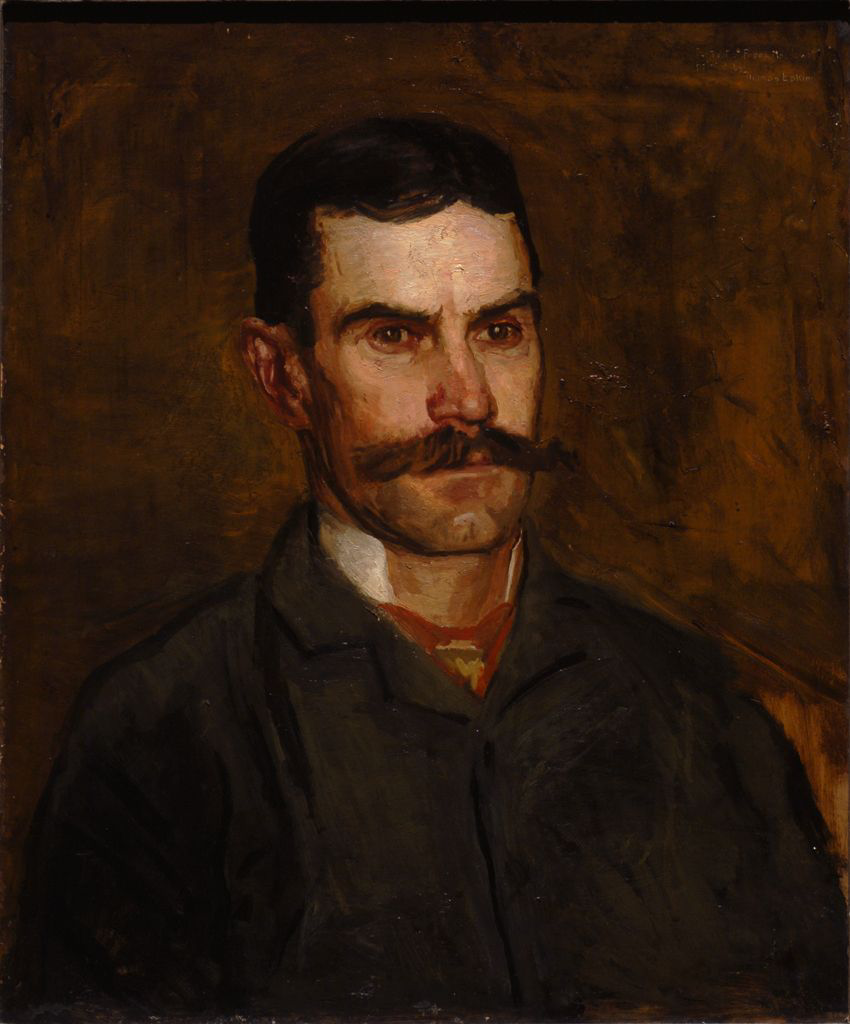
Brother: Frank Macdowell

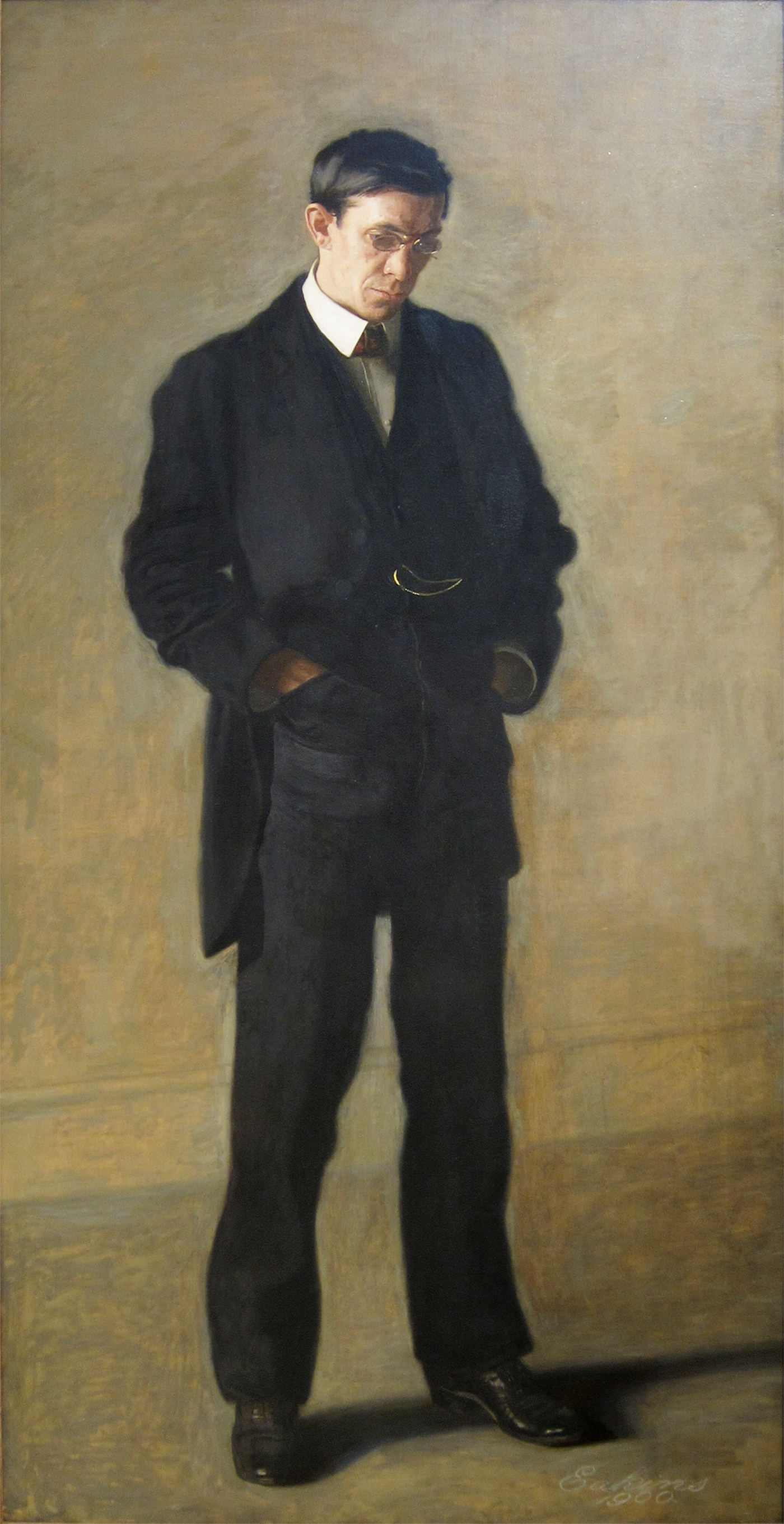
The Thinker by Thomas Eakins
