= Susan Macdowell Eakins =

American photographer (1851–1938)

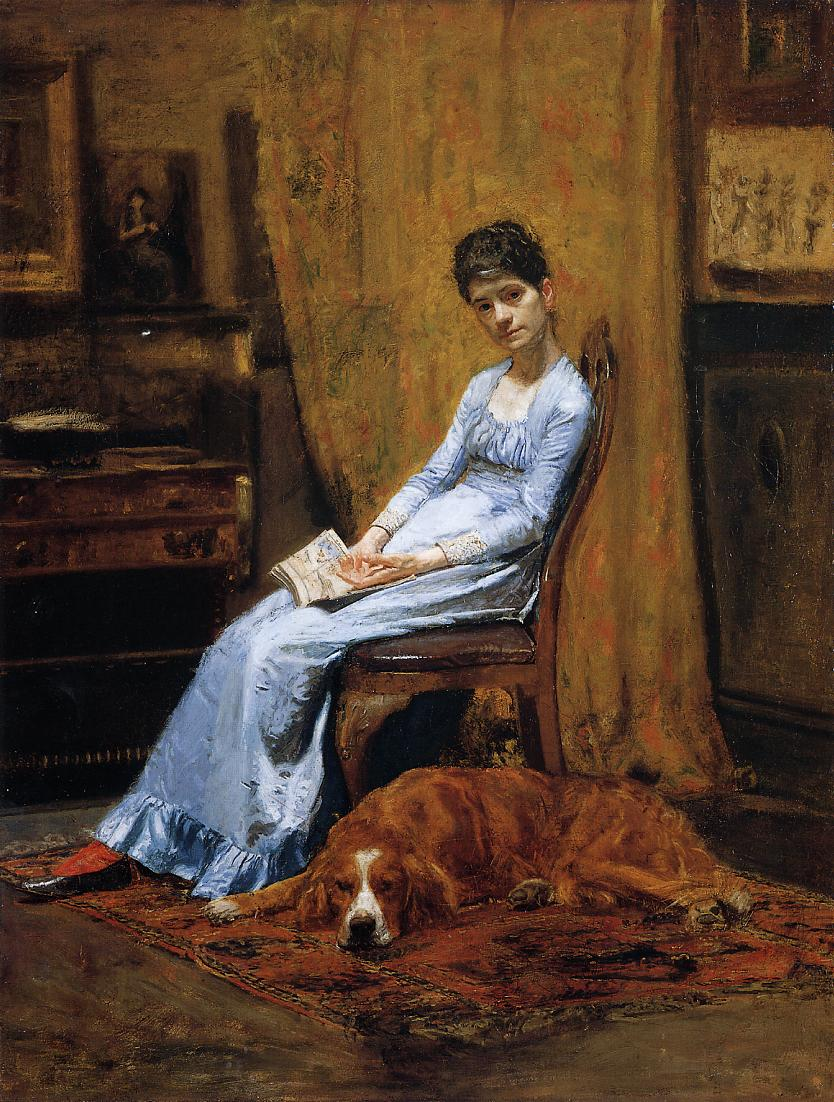
- Thomas Eakins, The Artist's Wife and His Dog (1884-89), depicts Susan Macdowell Eakins and their dog Harry, Metropolitan Museum of Art
- Born: Susan Hannah Macdowell; September 21, 1851; Philadelphia, Pennsylvania, US
- Died: December 27, 1938 (aged 87); Philadelphia, Pennsylvania, US
- Resting place: Woodlands Cemetery, Philadelphia, Pennsylvania; 39°56′51.27″N 75°12′3.98″W
- Education: Pennsylvania Academy of the Fine Arts, Thomas Eakins
- Known for: Painter
- Spouse: Thomas Eakins
- Awards: Mary Smith Prize in 1879 and Charles Toppan prize in 1882 from the Pennsylvania Academy of the Fine Arts.

Susan Hannah Eakins (née Macdowell; September 21, 1851 – December 27, 1938) was an American painter and photographer. Her works were first shown at the Pennsylvania Academy of the Fine Arts, where she was a student. She won the Mary Smith Prize there in 1879 and the Charles Toppan prize in 1882.

One of her teachers was the artist Thomas Eakins, who later became her husband. She made portrait and still life paintings. She was also known for her photography.

After her husband died in 1916, Eakins became a prolific painter. Her works were exhibited in group exhibitions in her lifetime, though her first solo exhibition was held after she died.

== Early life ==
She was the fifth of eight children of William H. Macdowell, a Philadelphia engraver and photographer, who also a skilled painter. He passed on to his three sons and five daughters his interest in Thomas Paine and freethought. Both Susan and her sister, Elizabeth, displayed early interest in art, which was encouraged by their father. Susan was given an attic studio for her artwork. Aside from her artistic talents, she was also a proficient pianist.

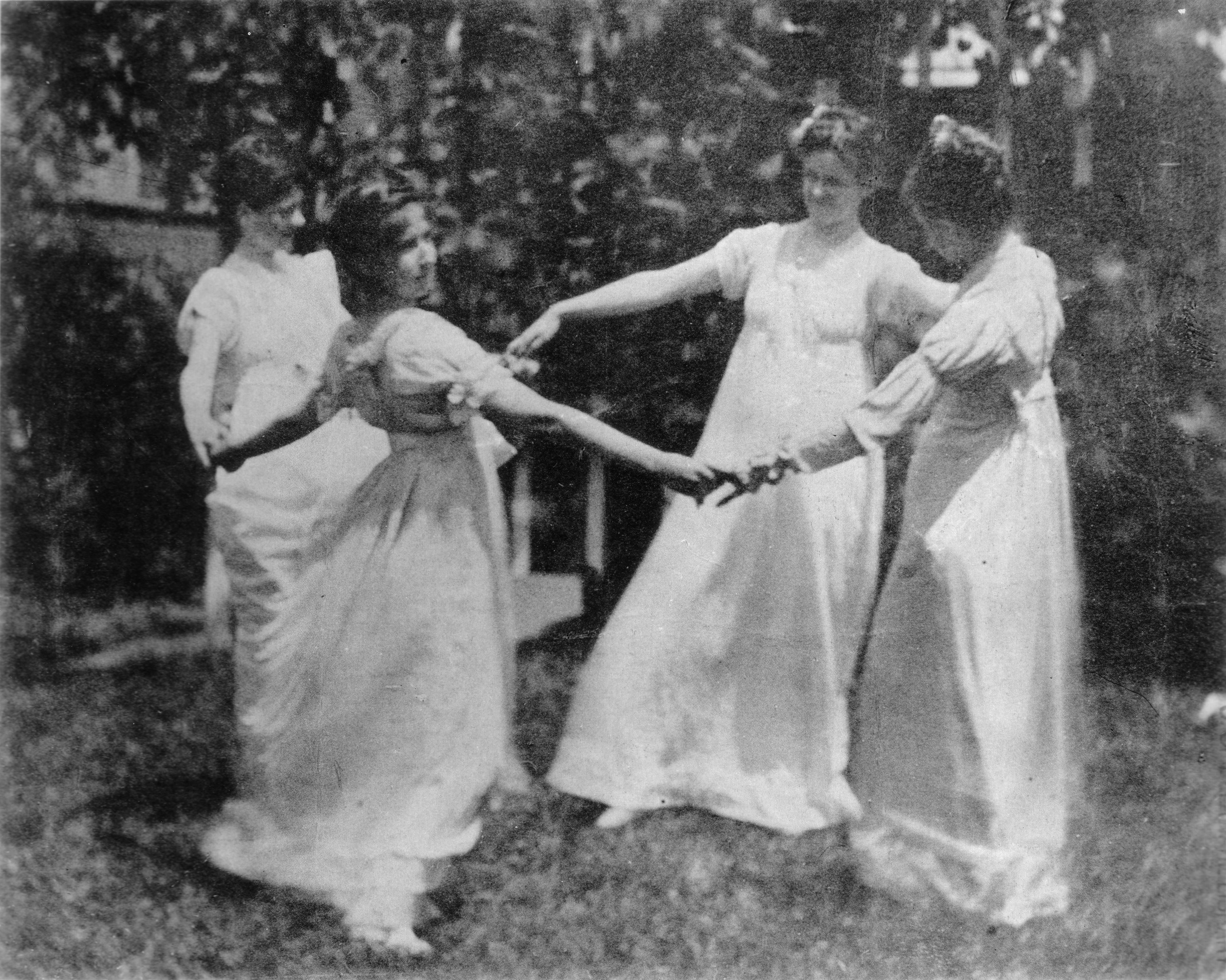
Thomas Eakins, Susan Hannah Macdowell, Unidentified Girl, Elizabeth Macdowell, and possibly Mary Macdowell at the Macdowell House, c. 1880-1882

== Education ==
She was 25 when she met Thomas Eakins at the Hazeltine Gallery where his painting The Gross Clinic was being exhibited in 1876. It was also shown at the Philadelphia Centennial Exposition.

Unlike many, she was impressed by the controversial painting and she decided to study with him at the Pennsylvania Academy of the Fine Arts, which she attended for six years. At that time Pennsylvania Academy of the Fine Arts was considered the best art school in the United States. Before she studied with Eakins, she studied with Christian Schussele. Under Eakins, she adopted a style similar to her teacher's. She was the winner of the first Mary Smith Prize in 1879 for Portrait of a Gentleman and Dog.

Her sister, Elizabeth, studied at the academy beginning in 1876, too. Other female art students included Mary Cassatt, Cecilia Beaux, Emily Sartain, and Alice Barber Stephens. They received a good education in art, but were restricted from painting nude male models. During her time as a student, she became class secretary, during which time she pulled for inclusion of women artists in the life-drawing classes of nude models.

== Marriage ==
She married Eakins in 1884. As director of the Pennsylvania Academy of the Fine Arts, Eakins had made the decision to use female and male nude models for the life studies classes for students of both genders. As a result of recriminations, he was asked to resign one year after their marriage. Even though he had support from some family and friends, it was a life-changing event that affected relationships in their lives and the Eakins' enthusiasm for life.

Eakins spent most of her time supporting her husband’s career, entertaining guests and students, and faithfully backing him in his difficult times with the Academy, even when some members of her family aligned against Eakins. The couple had no children.

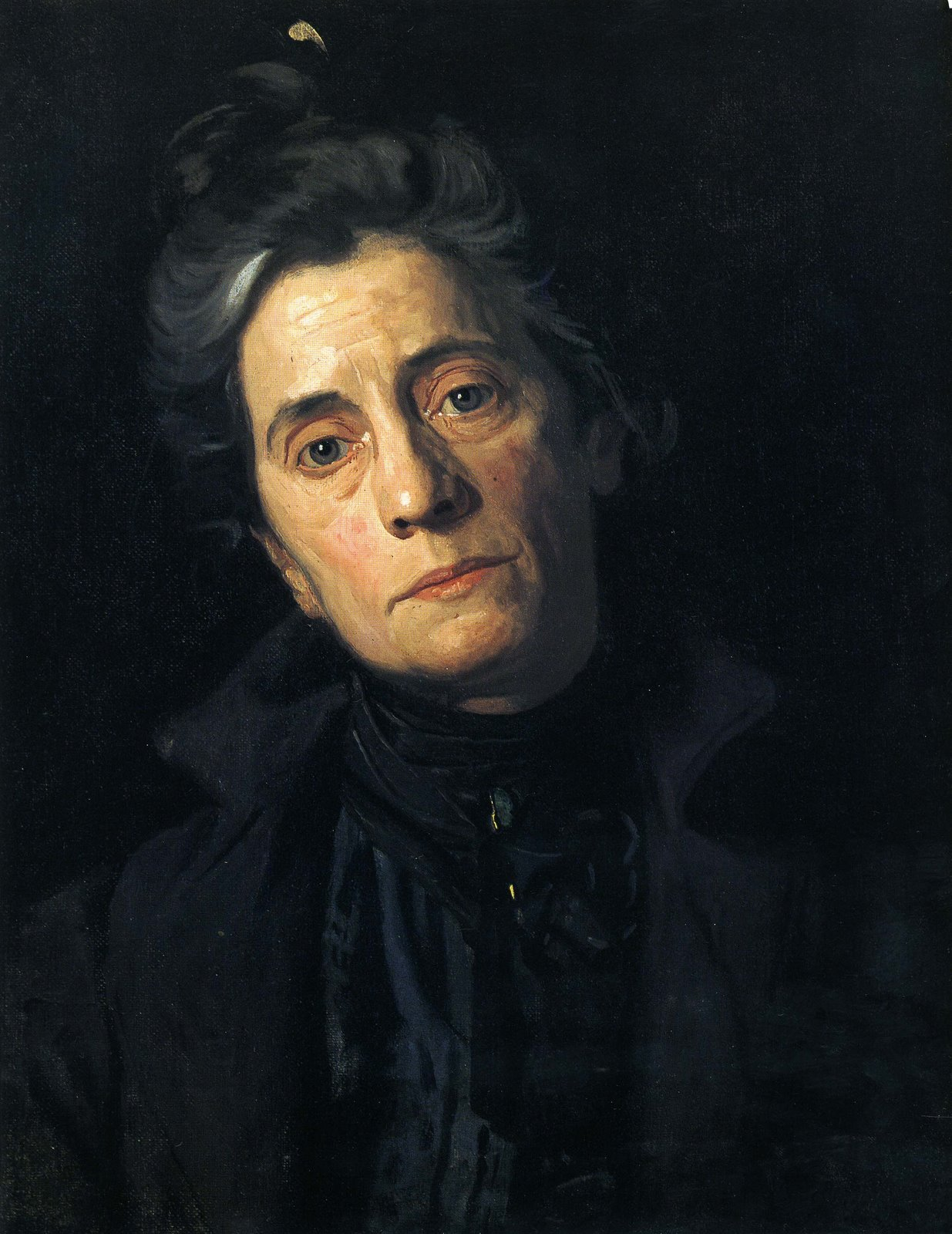
Thomas Eakins, Portrait of Susan Macdowell Eakins, Hirshhorn Museum

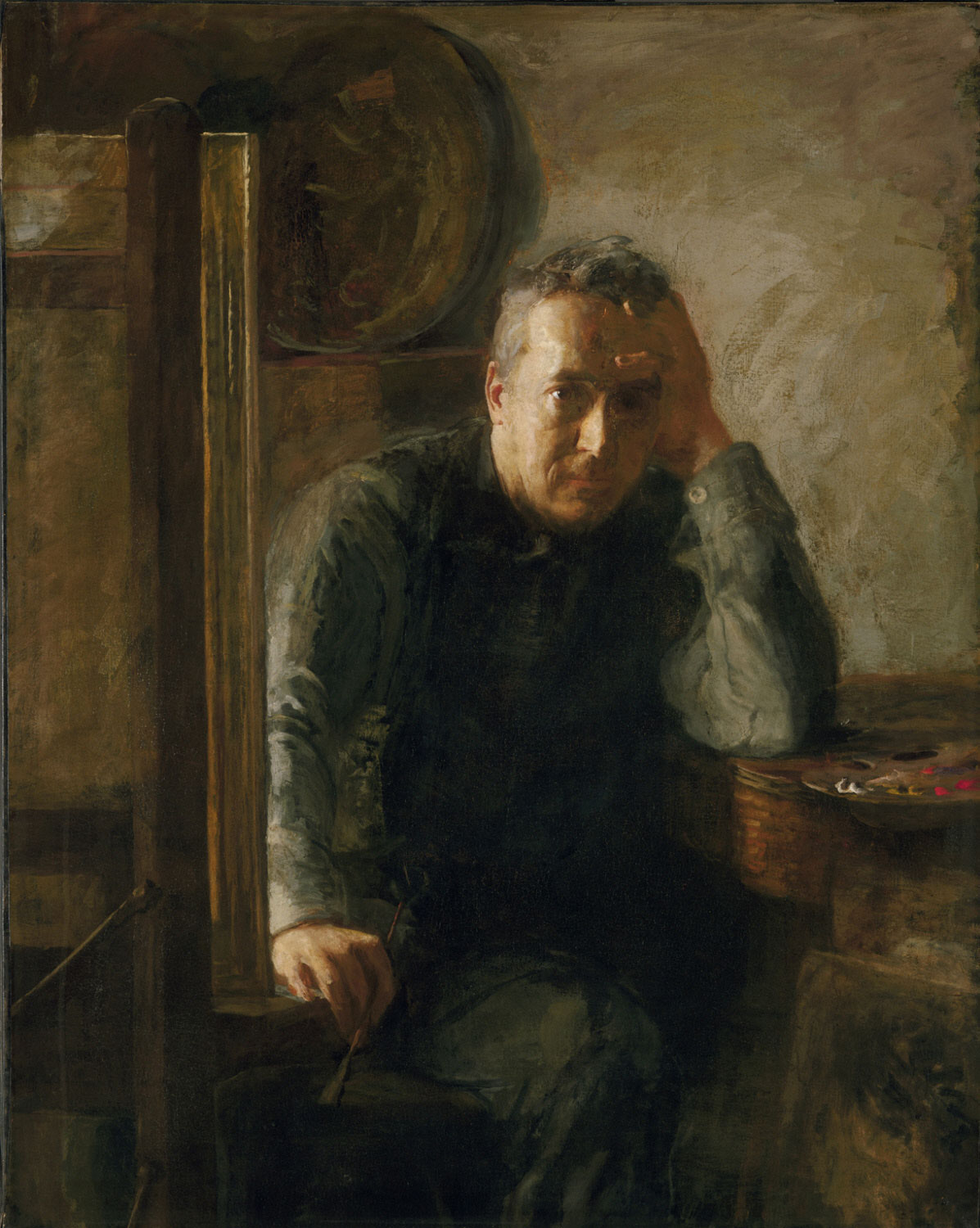
Susan Macdowell Eakins, Portrait of Thomas Eakins, posthumous, c. 1920-25, Philadelphia Museum of Art

== Career ==
Eakins painted portraits, many of which included family members, and scenes of domestic life. Between 1876 and 1882, Eakins exhibited her work at the Pennsylvania Academy of the Fine Arts. While she was married, Eakins only painted sporadically. Both had separate studios in their home. She shared a passion for photography with her husband, both as photographers and subjects, and employed it as a tool for their art. She also posed nude for many of his photos and took images of him. In 1898 she became a member and exhibited her works at the Philadelphia Photographic Salon, including Child with Doll, one of her best photographs. She exhibited in 1905 at the Pennsylvania Academy of the Fine Arts.

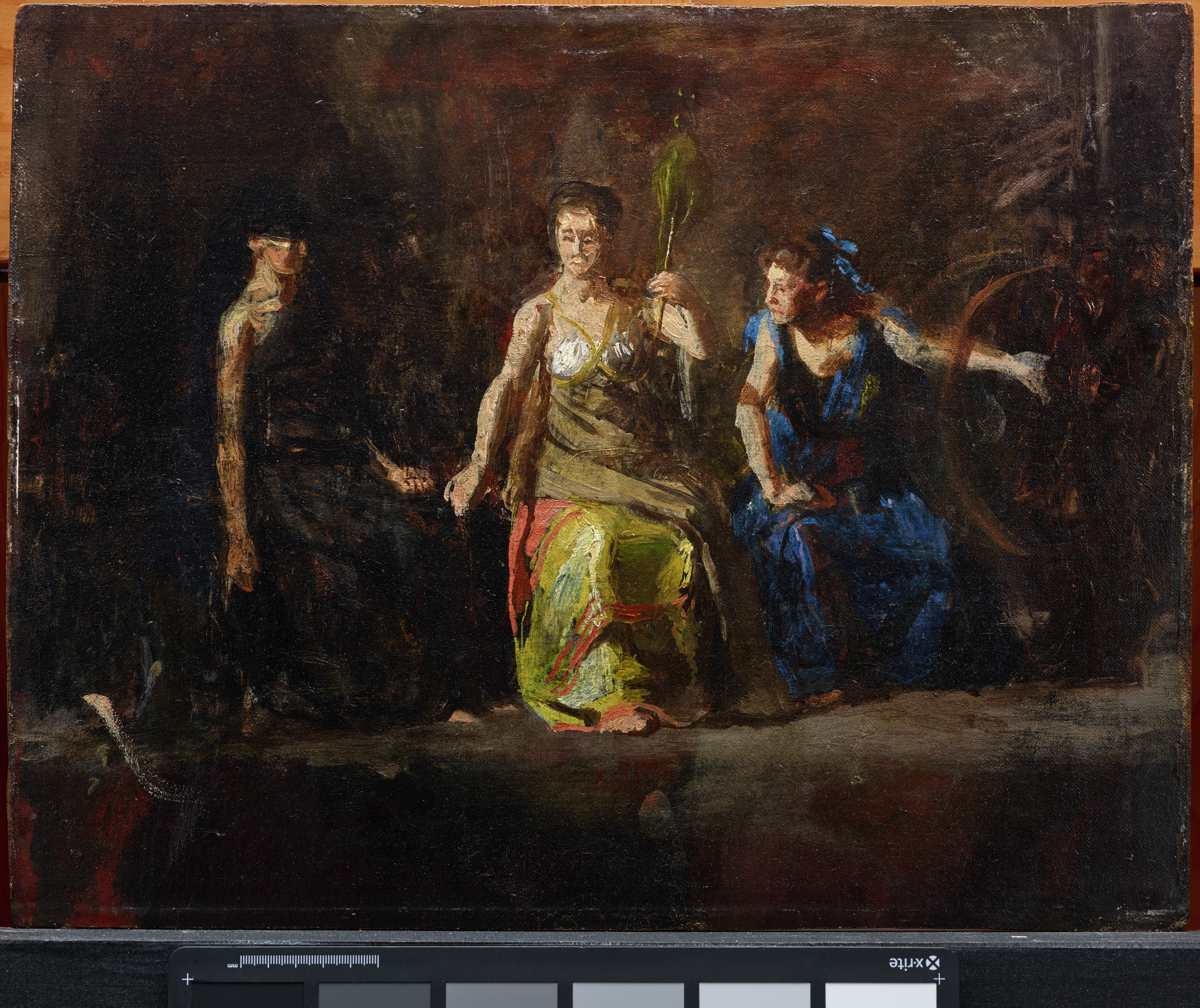
The Three Fates circa 1881

Of her paintings, Thomas Eakins said of her that she was more adept with color than he and that she was "as good as a woman painter as he had ever seen." Susan Casteras, art historian, said of her Portrait of a Lady, made in 1880, that it showed her "firm handling and solid anatomical construction blended with generally dark tonalities."

After Thomas Eakin's death in 1916, she returned to painting, working nearly every day, adding considerably to her output. Her paintings were made in a style that became warmer, looser, and brighter in tone. In 1936 her works and those of her husband and sister Elizabeth were exhibited at the Philadelphia Art Club.

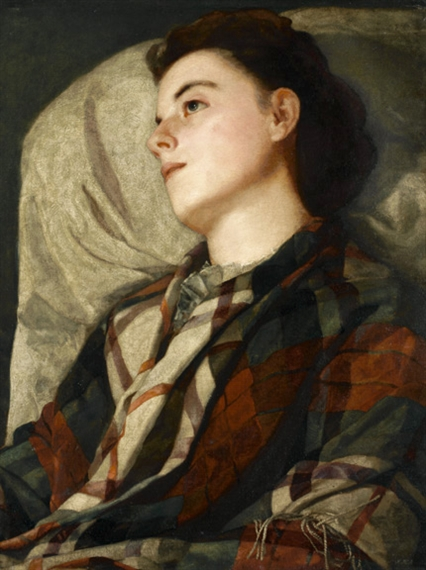
Woman in a Plaid Shawl, 1872

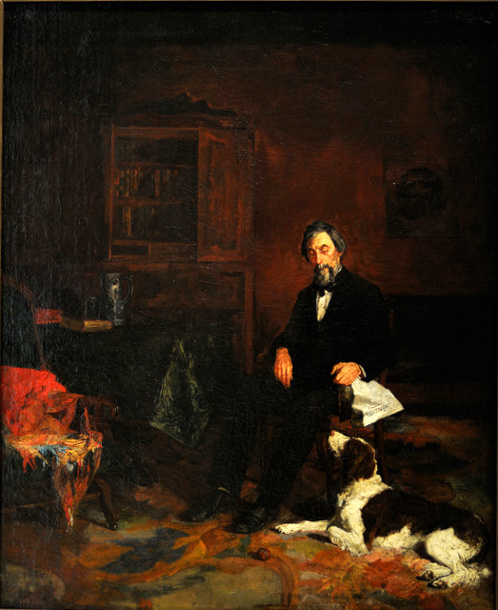
Gentleman and a Dog, 1878, Taubman Museum of Art, Roanoke, Virginia

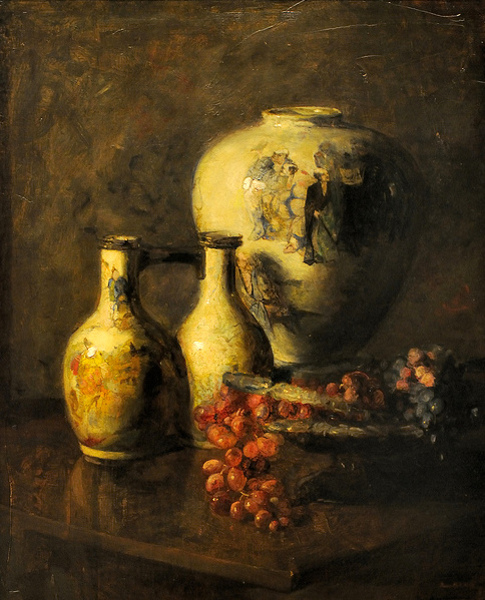
Still Life

== Death ==
She died December 27, 1938, in Philadelphia, Pennsylvania, after which her ashes were mixed with her husband's. The Eakins' ashes were buried in the Woodlands Cemetery in Philadelphia in an unmarked grave of her family's lot. A marker was installed in 1983 by an anonymous donor.

== Legacy ==
It was not until 35 years after her death, in 1973, that she had her first major exhibition at the Pennsylvania Academy of the Fine Arts. In 1976, her work was included in the Nineteenth Century Women Artists exhibition at the Whitney Museum of American Art.

In September and October 1977, an exhibition was held of the photographs and paintings of Susan, her sister Elizabeth and husband Thomas in Roanoke, Virginia at the North Cross School.

== Works ==
Her works included:

- Alfred Reynolds, oil on artist board, 1880-1900
- Anguish, oil, 1916
- Anna Hyatt Caldwell, oil. Mrs. Caldwell was the wife of Joseph Ralston Caldwell and died in 1935
- Artist and Model, oil
- Boy in Orange Shirt, oil
- Chaperone, watercolor on paper, 1879
- Child's Head, oil
- Clarence Cranmer, oil, 1920-1925
- Dancers, oil, c. 1890
- David Wilson Jordon, oil, Palmer Museum of Art, Pennsylvania State University
- Dora Adelman, oil, 1935
- Double Figure Study, oil
- Dr. William N. Bradley, oil, 1934
- Edward Coles (1786-1868), oil, 1883, Chicago Historical Society
- Fruit and Flower Arrangement, oil, c. 1880
- Gentleman and Dog, oil, 1878, Taubman Museum of Art, Roanoke, Virginia
- Girl in Yellow Blouse (seated), oil on canvas
- Girl in Yellow Blouse (standing), oil on canvas
- Girl Reading, oil, c. 1879
- Girl Reading, oil, 1925-1930
- Girls Head from the Rear, oil, c. 1890-1900
- Grandfather Macdowell, oil, 1879
- Hannah Macdowell and Sister, oil, 1882
- Hannah Trimble Gardner Macdowell, oil, 1880-1885
- Joanna Wnukowska Kowalewski, oil, 1933
- Kate Lewis, oil, 1884, Allentown Art Museum
- Landscape, oil
- Lenore Adelman, oil, 1933
- Leroy Ireland, oil on canvas, 1910, Brooklyn Museum of Art
- Lewis Sisters (at home), oil, 1932
- Luigi Maratti, oil on canvas, 1932
- Margaret Eakins, watercolor, c. 1878
- Mrs. King, watercolor, 1879
- Murray with Barry Statue, watercolor on paper
- Music, oil on linen covered board, c. 1875, Pennsylvania Academy of the Fine Arts
- Old Fashioned Dress, oil, 1880
- Old Man, Portrait Sketch, oil, c. 1885-1895
- Paul Crenshaw Physick, MD, oil, University of Pennsylvania
- Peonies, oil, 1925
- Pierre Menard, 1766 - 1844, oil on canvas, Chicago History Museum
- Portrait of a Bearded Man, oil, 1932, Kennedy Galleries, New York, New York
- Portrait of a Lady, oil, 1880
- Portrait of a Man, oil, 1920-1930
- Portrait of a Philadelphia Lady, 1890s
- Portrait of a Soldier, oil, 1917
- Portrait of a Woman, oil, c. 1880-1885
- Portrait of Charles Bregler, oil on canvas, 1920s, Pennsylvania Academy of the Fine Arts
- Portrait of David Wilson Jordan, oil, Palmer Museum of Art, Pennsylvania State University
- Portrait of Thomas Eakins s, oil, c. 1889, Philadelphia Museum of Art
- Reflections, oil, 1881
- Roseanna Williams, oil on wood panel, 1879, Pennsylvania Academy of the Fine Arts
- Roseanna Williams, watercolor, 1879
- Sculptor and Model, oil, 1924
- Seated Girl in Tunic, oil, 1920-1930
- Seated Old Woman Reading, oil
- Spinning, watercolor, c. 1878
- Still Life, oil, c. 1920
- Still Life: Dish, Vegetable and Fruit, oil
- Study of Cello Player, oil, c. 1895-1900
- Study of a Man
- Study of Susan, oil
- Susan and Elizabeth Macdowell (self-portrait), oil, 1879
- Susan and Elizabeth Macdowell (self-portrait), oil, 1910-1920
- Susan and Elizabeth Macdowell (self-portrait), oil, 1925
- Susan Hannah Macdowell Eakins (self-portrait as a child), oil, after 1861
- Susan Hannah Macdowell Eakins (self-portrait), oil, c. 1910-1920, private collection
- Tennis Player, oil, 1933
- The Bibliophile, oil, 1932
- The Spinners (Three Fates), oil on masonite
- Thomas Cadwalader, 1795 - 1873, oil, 1882
- Thomas Cowperthwaite Eakins, oil, c. 1920
- Thomas Eakins Working at an Easel, oil on board, early to mid 1880s, Pennsylvania Academy of the Fine Arts
- Two Ladies and Dog, oil, c. 1880-1885
- Two Sisters, oil on canvas, 1879
- Unidentified Girl, oil, c. 1879
- Unidentified Man, oil, 1880-1900
- Unidentified Woman, oil
- Walter Gardner Macdowell, oil, 1880-1930
- Watchful Guardian, oil, 1878
- William H. Macdowell, Portrait Sketch oil, 1880-1881
- William H. Macdowell, oil, 1881
- William Pepper (1810-1864) oil, 1883, University of Pennsylvania
- Woman in a Plain Shawl, oil on canvas, c. 1872
- Woman in Profile, oil, c. 1890-1900
- Woman Reading, oil on canvas, 1879-1884
- Woman Seated, oil, 1880, was in the collection of Mr. and Mrs. John D. Rockefeller III
- Woman with Book, oil
