= Taubman Museum of Art =

Coordinates: 37.2728°N 79.9383°W

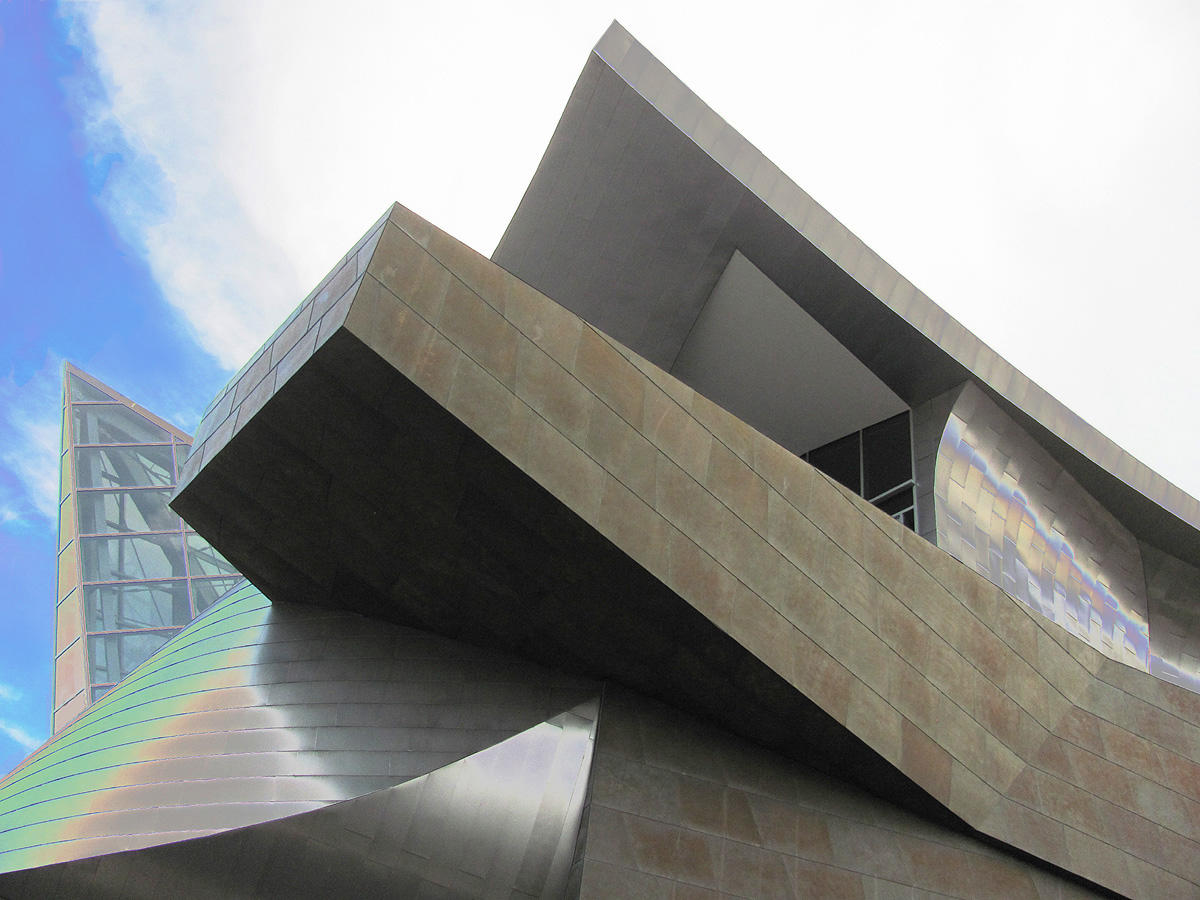
- Established: 1951
- Location: 110 Salem Avenue SE; Roanoke, Virginia, 24011; United States
- Type: Art museum
- Director: Cindy Petersen
- Website: www.taubmanmuseum.org

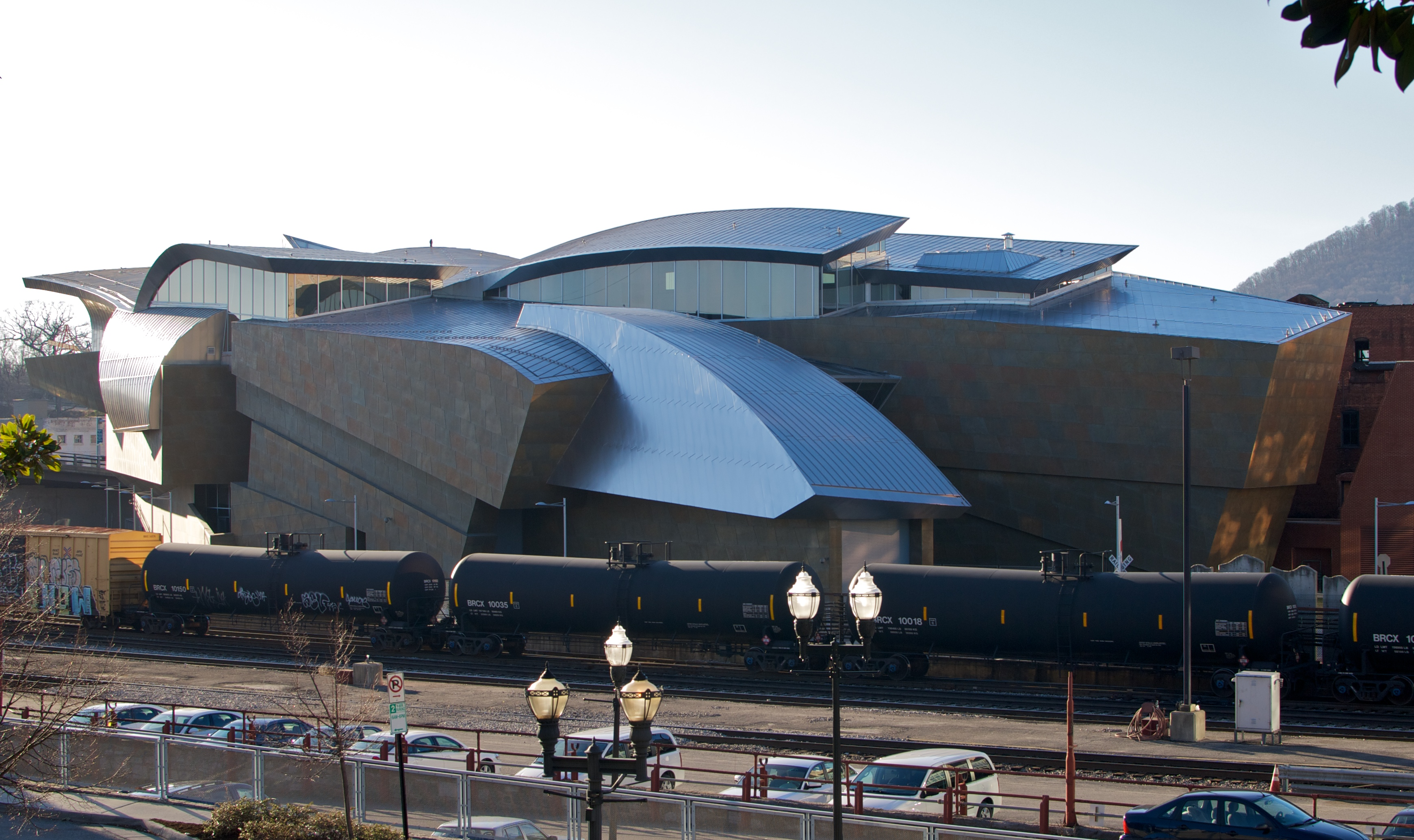
Taubman Museum of Art

The Taubman Museum of Art, formerly the Art Museum of Western Virginia, is an art museum in downtown Roanoke, Virginia, United States. Formally established in 1951, the museum was housed in several locations around Roanoke before moving in 2008 to its current home, a contemporary architecture building designed by Randall Stout. The museum specializes in American art, and provides free general admission daily.

== History ==
In 1947, the Roanoke chapter of the American Association of University Women requested a major exhibition from the Virginia Museum of Fine Arts, which moved part of its staff and permanent collection to the Hotel Roanoke for a period of time. In 1951, the Roanoke Fine Arts Center was incorporated as an independent organization. The institution used the City of Roanoke's main library for exhibitions during the early 1950s. The center rented a building on Franklin Road in 1954, and in 1955, moved into a new facility at the corner of 25th Street and Carolina Avenue in South Roanoke. The building was donated by Mr. and Mrs. J. Meade Harris.

In 1965, the Roanoke Fine Arts Center and the Junior League of Roanoke Valley purchased Cherry Hill, a former residential home. The house's owner sold it to the arts center for $90,000, far below its appraised value. The museum's first exhibition at Cherry Hill was of works by Thomas Eakins, borrowed from his Roanoke relatives. The institution changed its name to The Roanoke Museum of Fine Arts in 1979.

In 1983, the museum relocated to the new Center in the Square building on Market Square in downtown Roanoke. The new location, larger in size and with more gallery space for the permanent collection, also aimed to provide a venue where "art happens". The institution changed its name again in 1992, becoming the Art Museum of Western Virginia. In 2001 the museum received the long-promised Peggy Macdowell Thomas bequest, which included 27 works associated with Ms. Thomas's relative Thomas Eakins and his circle along with funds to support a named gallery.

By the late 1990s, the museum had outgrown its space in Center in the Square, and was considering moving to the site of a building donated by the owners of Grand Home Furnishings. However, it was announced in 2000 that the city was donating a site as well as $4 million for a new home for the museum, which was to be paired with an IMAX theater. In 2002, the art museum declared that Randall Stout had been selected as design architect for its new facility, and construction began in May 2006. Stout's avant-garde design was controversial, but its architecture has since received international praise. In February 2008, the Board of Trustees of the institution announced that the new building was to be named in honor of the former CEO of Advance Auto Parts and later U.S. ambassador to Romania Nicholas F. Taubman, and his wife Eugenia Taubman. The pair donated over $15 million towards the project's $66 million overall cost. The Taubman Museum of Art opened to the public on November 8, 2008.

The 75,000-square-foot (7,000 m^{2}) facility houses twelve galleries hosting 12–15 exhibitions annually. It also includes the City of Roanoke Atrium, a 77-foot-tall (23 m) space used for large, temporary installations, and Art Venture, an interactive gallery aimed at younger visitors. The IMAX theater was not included in the building's final design; the area intended for it was made into gallery space and a multipurpose hall. Corporate donations have provided free admission to the museum's permanent galleries since 2012.

== Collection and exhibitions ==
The permanent collection of more than 2,000 works of art includes prominent 19th- and early 20th-century American art, as well as significant modern and contemporary art, photography, design, and decorative arts, and several smaller collections including Southern folk art. The American art collection dates from the mid-19th through the second quarter of the 20th century, providing works from the Hudson River, American Realism, American Impressionism, and Arts and Crafts art movements. American artists in the museum's permanent collection include Thomas Eakins, Winslow Homer, Childe Hassam, Maurice Prendergast, John Singer Sargent, Robert Henri, Norman Rockwell, George Inness, Eduard Steichen, Thomas Hart Benton, and Lilly Martin Spencer. The modern and contemporary collection includes works by Jasper Johns, Robert Rauschenberg, Jacob Lawrence, Romare Bearden, John Cage, Audrey Flack, and Dorothy Gillespie.

== Gallery ==
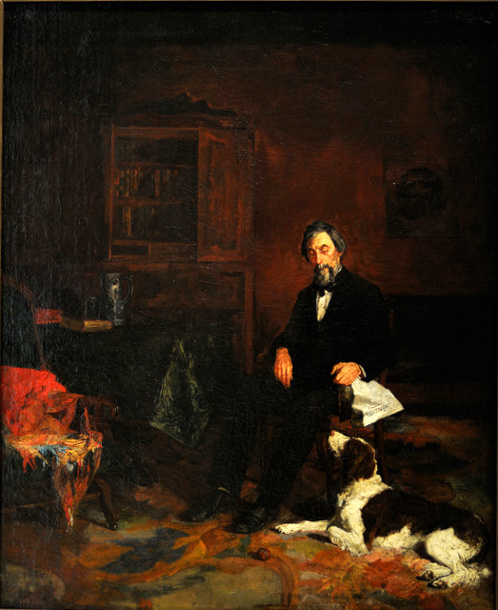
Gentleman and a Dog (1878) by Susan Macdowell Eakins

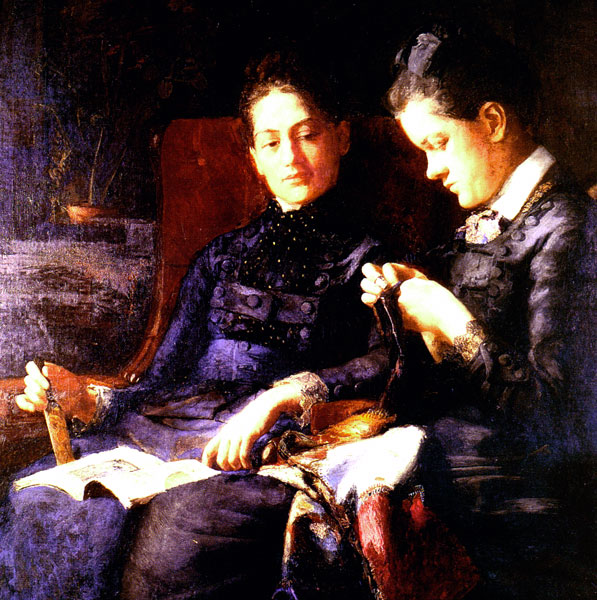
Two Sisters (Mary & Elizabeth Macdowell) (1879) by Susan Macdowell Eakins

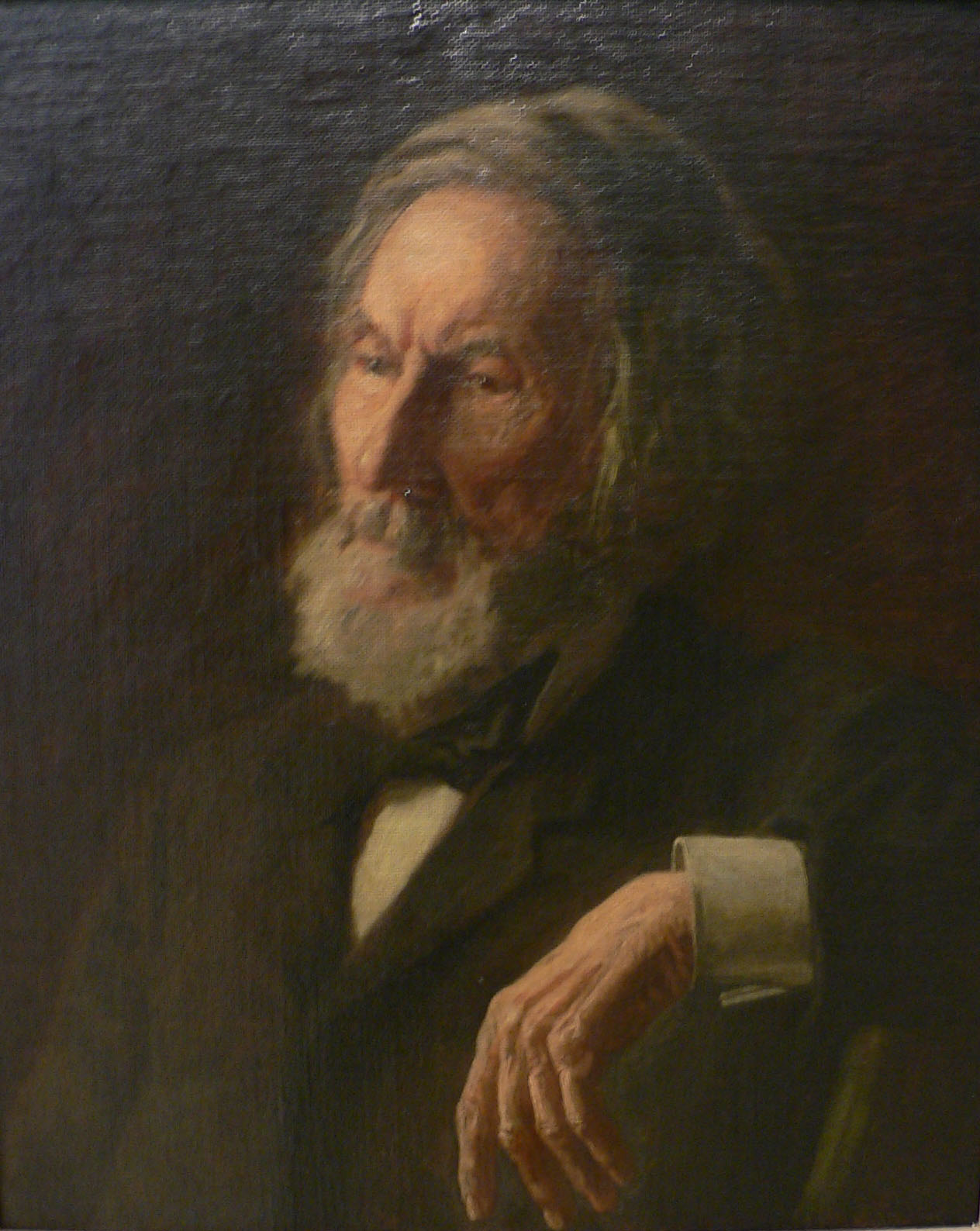
William H. Macdowell (1891) by Thomas Eakins

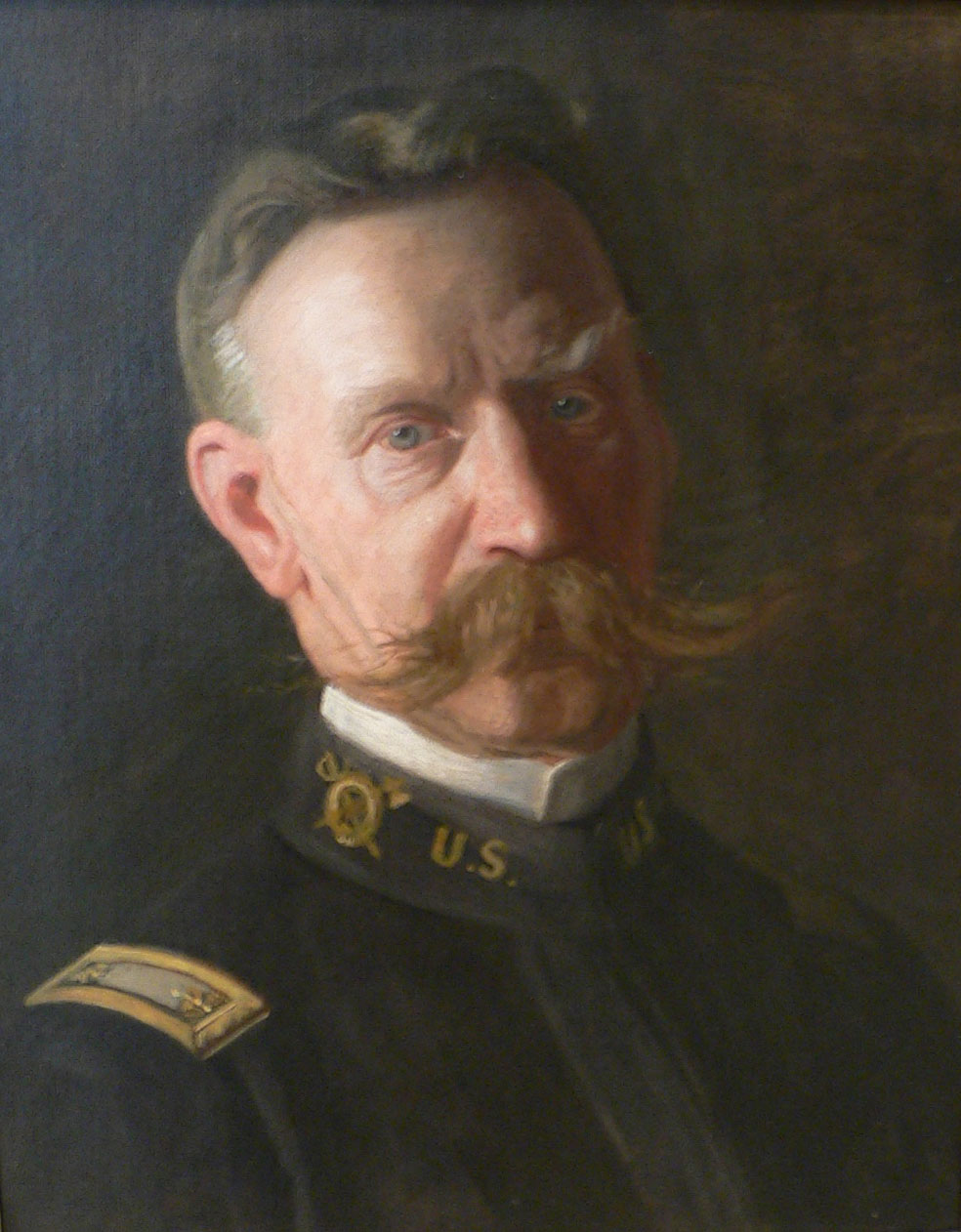
Alfred Reynolds (1902) by Thomas Eakins

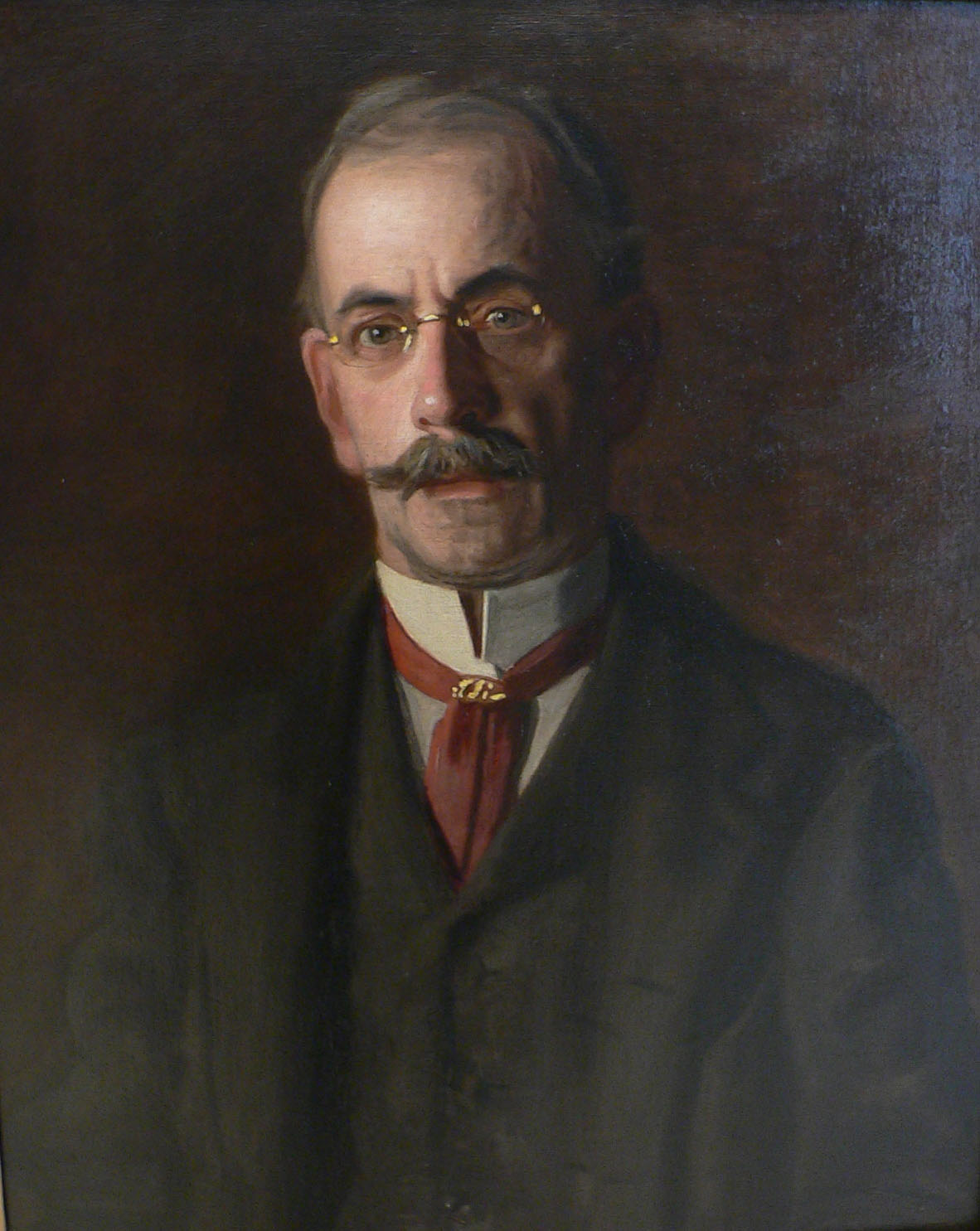
Walter Macdowell (1904) by Thomas Eakins

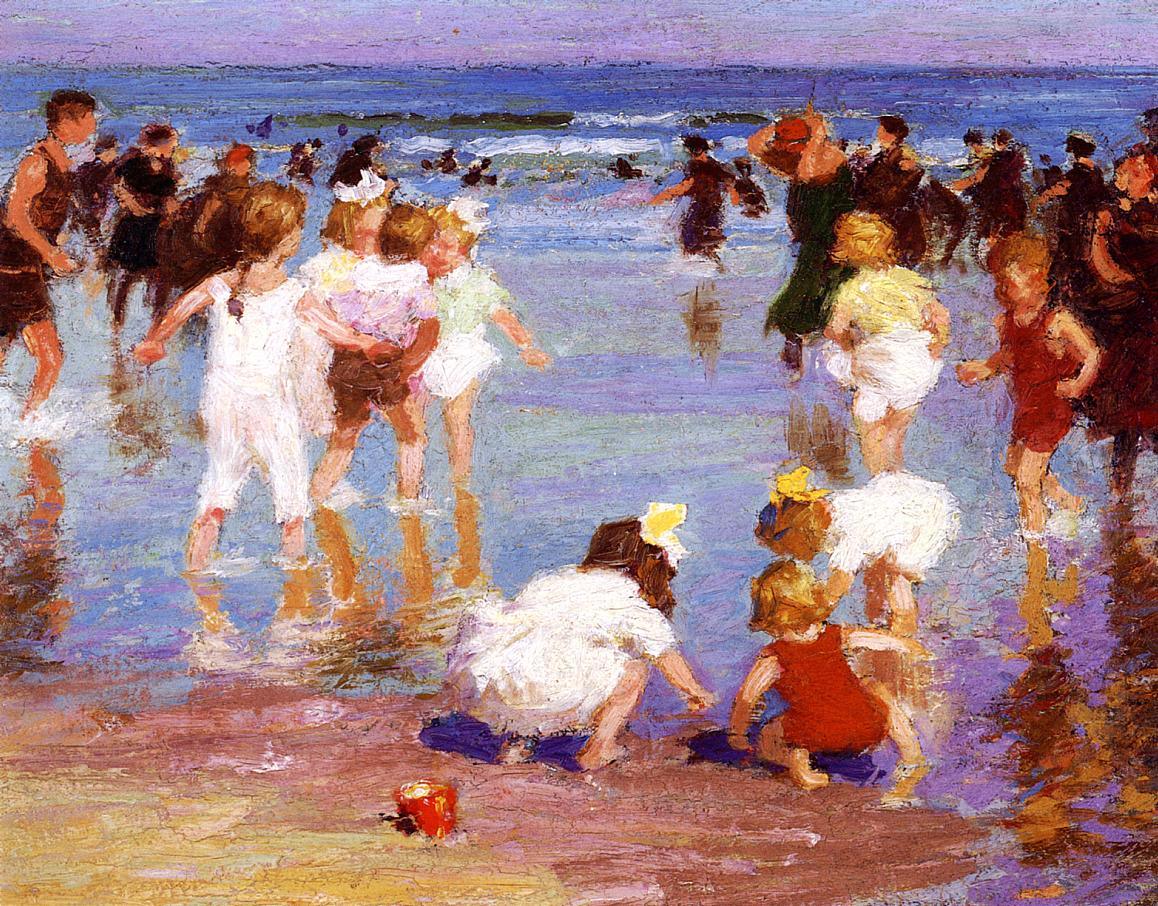
Happy Days (c. 1910-20) by Edward Henry Potthast
