= Overbrook, Philadelphia =

Overbrook
- Neighborhood of Philadelphia
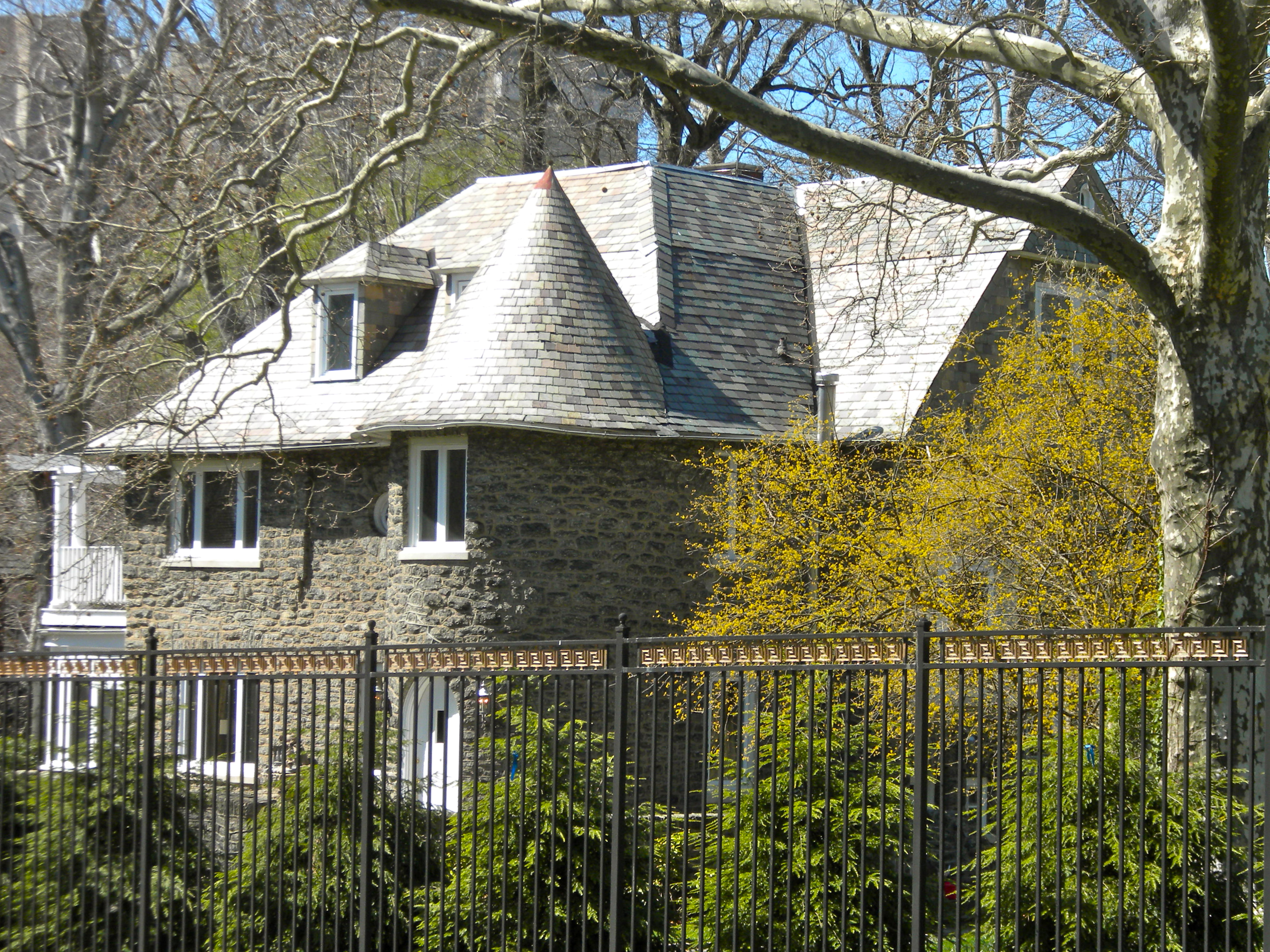
- House in Overbrook Farms

- Location within Philadelphia
- Country: United States
- State: Pennsylvania
- County: Philadelphia County
- City: Philadelphia
- Area codes: 215, 267, and 445

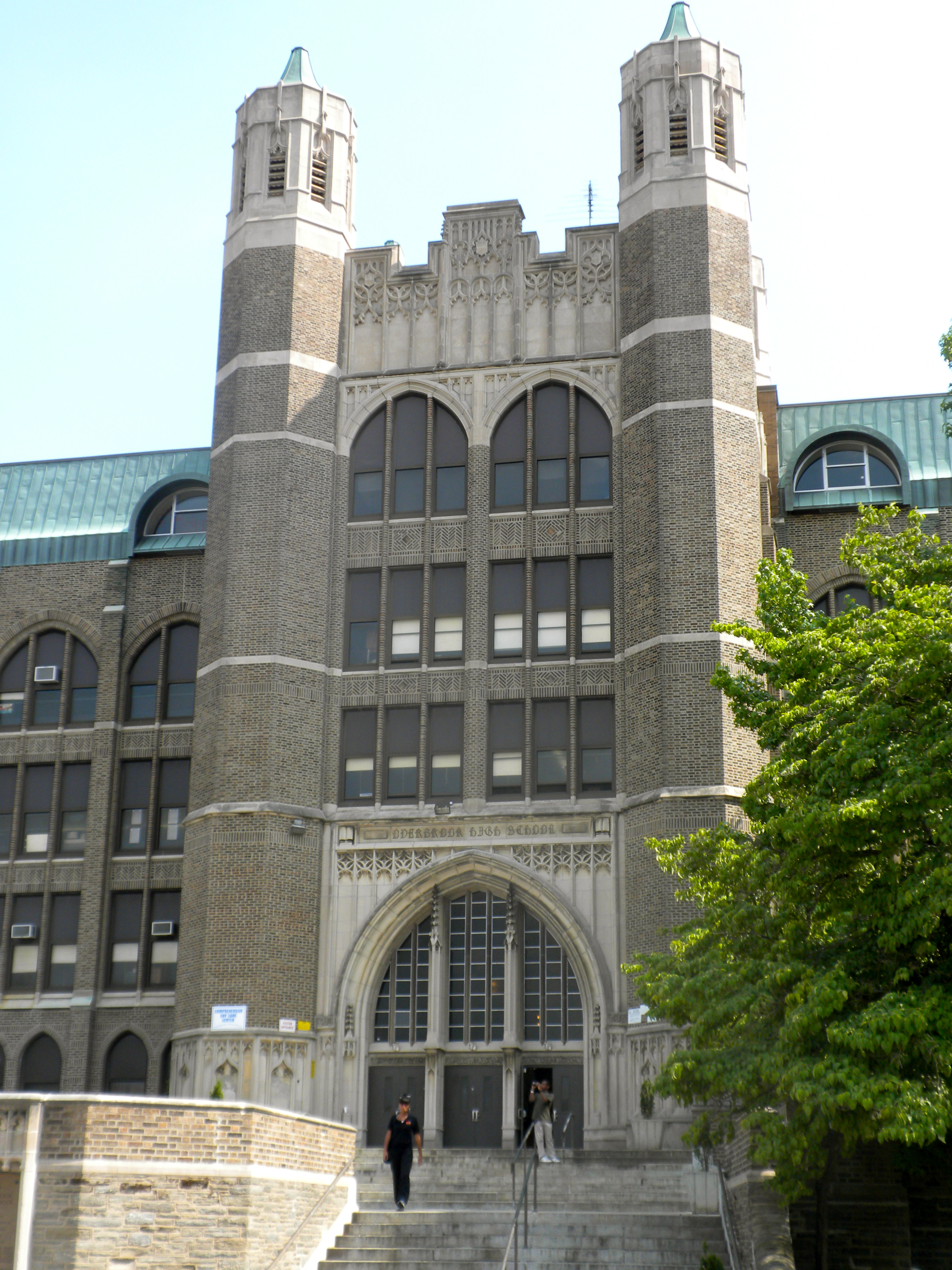
Overbrook High School at 59th Street and Lancaster Avenue

Overbrook is a historic neighborhood of Philadelphia, Pennsylvania. It is situated in the northwest of West Philadelphia.

The area's housing ranges from large, old homes to rowhouses to three- and four-story apartment buildings.

== Physical setting ==
Overbrook lies in the northwest of West Philadelphia, surrounded by Wynnefield to the east, Carroll Park to the south, and Montgomery County to the north. The neighborhoods of Overbrook Farms, Morris Park and Overbrook Park are often considered to be part of Overbrook, but in many city documents they are considered separate from the neighborhood proper, which in a 2004 map from the Philadelphia City Planning Commission was narrowly defined as bounded by North 63rd Street to the west, Lansdowne Avenue to the south, and SEPTA's regional rail tracks to the northeast. A map produced by the Delaware Valley Regional Planning Commission and The Philadelphia Inquirer places the boundaries of the neighborhood at the west branch of Indian Creek to the west, Lansdowne Avenue to the south, 54th Street to the east, and the city limit at City Line Avenue to the north. Any definition places the neighborhood in close proximity to Overbrook High School, the Overbrook School for the Blind, the Overbrook SEPTA Station, and Overbrook Avenue.

The neighborhood gets its name from Overbrook station, where the tracks run "over the brook" of Mill Creek, one of two creeks that run thorough the neighborhood. Mill Creek enters a culvert in Montgomery County close to the station and flows underground through the center of the neighborhood and beyond before emptying into the Schuylkill River. Indian Creek runs primarily above ground through Morris Park before emptying into Cobbs Creek.

== History ==
The land that would become Overbrook, along with the rest of Philadelphia, made up part of the vast Northeastern coastal forests inhabited by the Lenape people. European settlers moved inland from the Delaware River in the 17th century, including Welsh settlers who acquired land in the areas west of Philadelphia in the 1680s, establishing farms and mills. Several large farms owned by Welsh farmers in the Western Liberties would later become the neighborhood of Overbrook.

The agricultural lands near Indian and Mill Creek in 1704 became part of Blockley Township and in 1795 were connected to Philadelphia via the Philadelphia and Lancaster Turnpike, what is today Lancaster Avenue. The construction of the Philadelphia and Columbia Railroad, also known as the Main Line, further connected the area to the city. This line was later incorporated into the Pennsylvania Railroad and in 1860 Overbrook station was opened and named after Mill Creek, which the tracks ran over.

The first residential development in the Overbrook area was the construction of the planned suburb of Overbrook Farms from the 1890s through the 1920s. In 1892, the investment bank Drexel & Company, led by Anthony Joseph Drexel, began buying up agricultural land near Overbrook station. Working with the architects Herman Wendell and Walter Bassett Smith, they began the construction of what was billed as a "suburb deluxe" for middle to upper-class families hoping to leave the city. The neighborhood had its own water system, steam heat (from the Overbrook Steam Heat Company), and electricity (from the Overbrook Electric Company), and was well connected to the city with trains running every half hour. Overbrook Farms was designated a "historic district" in 2019 by the Philadelphia Historical Commission.

== Architecture ==
Overbrook developed in various stages between 1900 and 1960. The dominant housing type is the row house, present in a wide variety of styles. Built during the early twentieth century when trolley lines were allowing middle-class Philadelphians to move out from more crowded row house communities, Overbrook was a community of choice at that time. Outside of Overbrook Farms, most of the houses in the Overbrook area date from between 1915 and 1930, when the Great Depression halted new construction nationally and locally.

In addition to rowhouses, there are a number of twin (semi-detached) houses. These semi-detached homes have two or three floors and typically are over 2,000 square feet (190 m^{2}) in size. Prime examples of typical Overbrook twin houses are along Wynnewood Road from Haverford Avenue to Malvern Avenue, North 64th Street between Lansdowne and Lebanon Avenues, or Nassau Road between North 61st and 63rd Streets. There are very few detached single-family homes in Overbrook. Single homes typically pre-date the construction of most of Overbrook's housing or came into existence on select lots after the construction of most of the rowhouses and twin houses. For example, one will see a few single-family homes on Wynnewood Road near Columbia Avenue. A large stone home remains this intersection. This home once sat on acres of land that the owner(s) sold off to developers who then constructed twin houses and rowhouses. The vast majority of the single-family, detached homes in the Overbrook area are in the Overbrook Farms neighborhood.

== Demographics ==
Demographic information for ZIP Code 19151 covers Overbrook and Morris Park as well as parts of Carroll Park. This ZIP Code as a whole is sometimes referred to as Overbrook. Major trends identified in 2011 were an increase in the African American population and a drop in the White population from 1990 to 2010, a change which took place primarily in the 1990s.

Demographics of ZIP Code 19151
Race & Ethnicity	1990	2010	2020
Black (Non-Hispanic)	13,386; 43.6%	24,656; 82.7%	25,834; 85%
White (Non-Hispanic)	16,004; 52.2%	3,175; 10.6%	2,387; 7.9%
Hispanic/Latino (any race)	449	820	979
Other	828	1,181	1,194
Total	30,667	29,832	30,394

== Landmarks ==
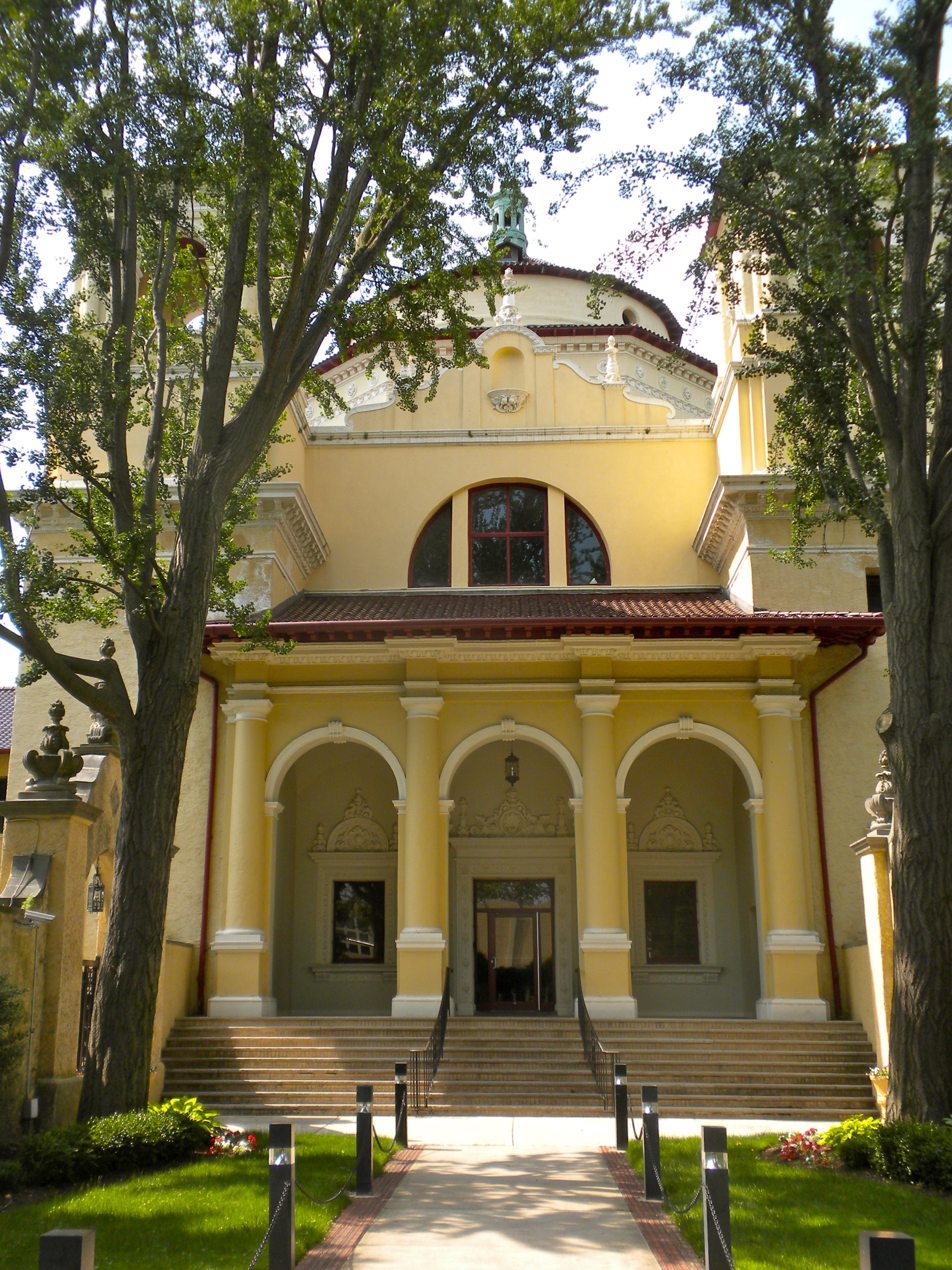
Overbrook School for the Blind

Overbrook, while overwhelmingly residential in character, does have several notable landmark buildings and institutions.

=== Natural ===
- Mill Creek - runs underground starting near Overbrook station
- Indian Creek (Cobbs Creek tributary) - runs through Morris Park
- Cobbs Creek Park – forms southern border of Overbrook section, undergoing restoration in many places

=== Educational ===
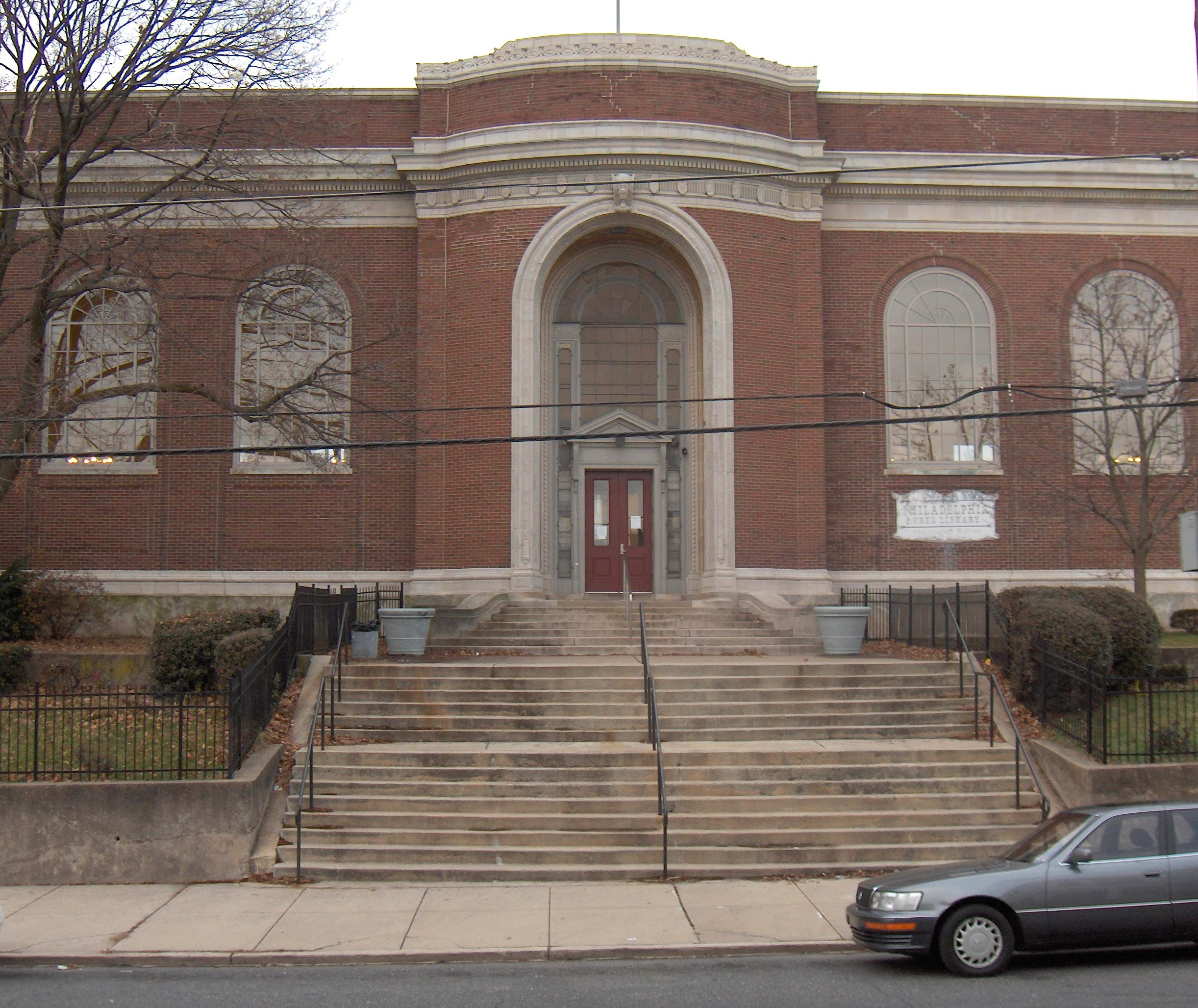
Haddington Branch

- Overbrook Elementary School – 2032 N. 62nd St., listed on the National Register of Historic Places
- Overbrook High School – 59th and Lancaster, listed on the National Register of Historic Places
- Overbrook School for the Blind – Malvern Avenue near 64th, landmark campus sporting Spanish Revival architecture
- Lewis C. Cassidy School/Academics Plus School, 6523 Lansdowne Avenue, Philadelphia, Pennsylvania 19151, listed on the National Register of Historic Places
- Our Lady of Lourdes Catholic School and Church – 63rd and Lancaster, historic grade school attended by actor Will Smith
- The Free Library of Philadelphia Haddington Branch serves Overbrook-Morris Park.

=== Religious ===
- African Episcopal Church of St. Thomas - 6361 Lancaster Avenue
- Mosque of Shaikh M. R. Bawa Muhaiyaddeen
- Talmudical Yeshiva of Philadelphia
- St. Donato Roman Catholic Church
- Overbrook Presbyterian Church at the corner of Lancaster Avenue and City Avenue, first constructed in 1889

== Overbrook in media ==
Entertainer Will Smith, who attended Overbrook High School, named his production company, Overbrook Entertainment, after the neighborhood.
