= Overbrook School =

Overbrook School may refer to:

- Overbrook Elementary School, Philadelphia, Pennsylvania
- Overbrook High School (Philadelphia), Philadelphia, Pennsylvania
- Overbrook High School (New Jersey), Pine Hill, New Jersey
- Overbrook School for the Blind, Philadelphia, Pennsylvania
