= Overbrook Farms, Philadelphia =

- Overbrook Farms
- U.S. National Register of Historic Places
- U.S. Historic district
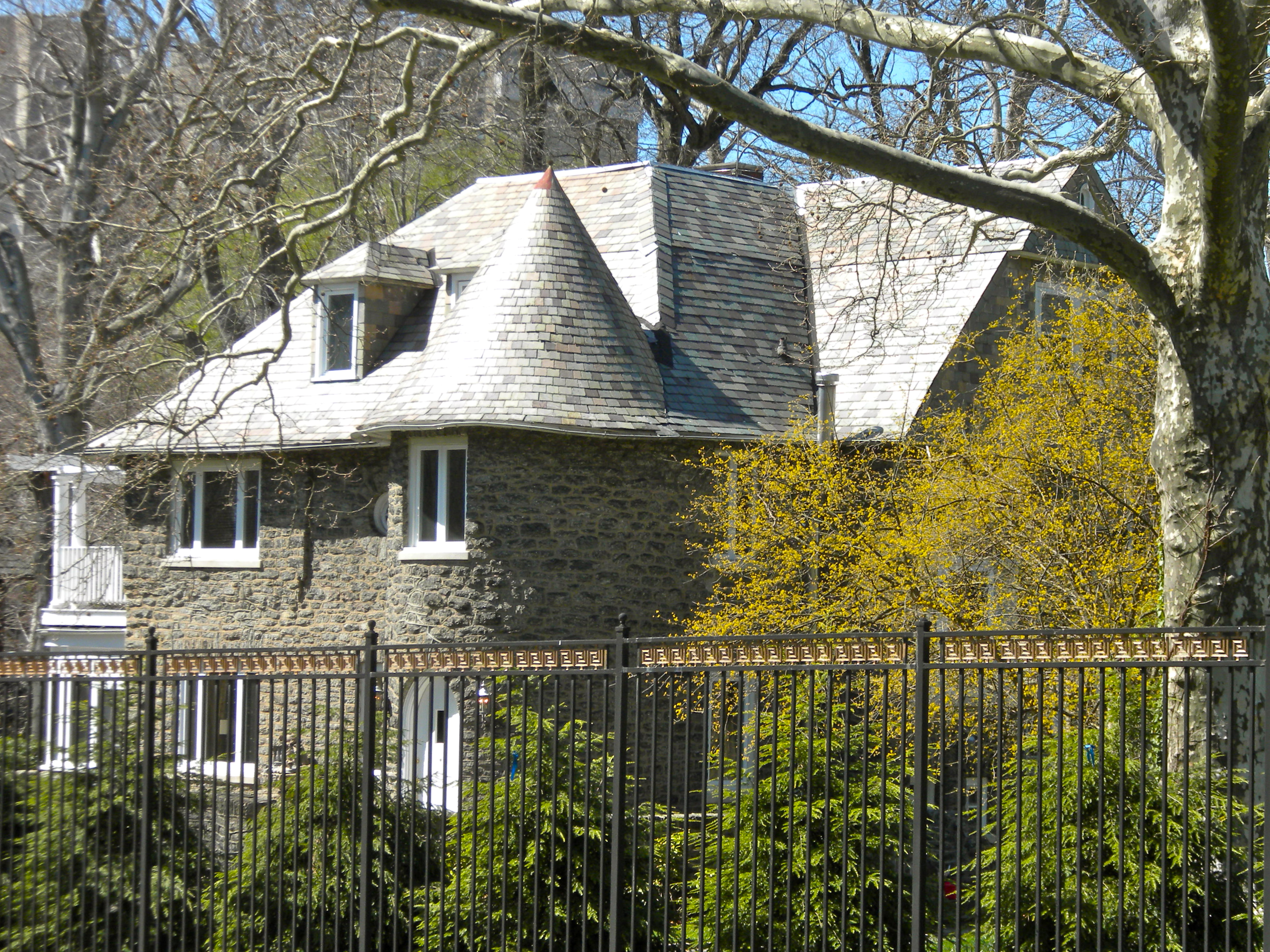

- Location within Philadelphia Location within Pennsylvania Location within the United States
- Location: Roughly bounded by City Line Ave., 58th St., Woodbine Ave. and 64th St., Philadelphia, Pennsylvania
- Coordinates: 39°59′11″N 75°15′13″W
- Area: 168 acres (68 ha)
- Built: 1893
- Architect: Keen & Mead et al.
- Architectural style: Late 19th and 20th Century Revivals , Late Victorian
- NRHP reference No.: 85000690
- Added to NRHP: March 21, 1985

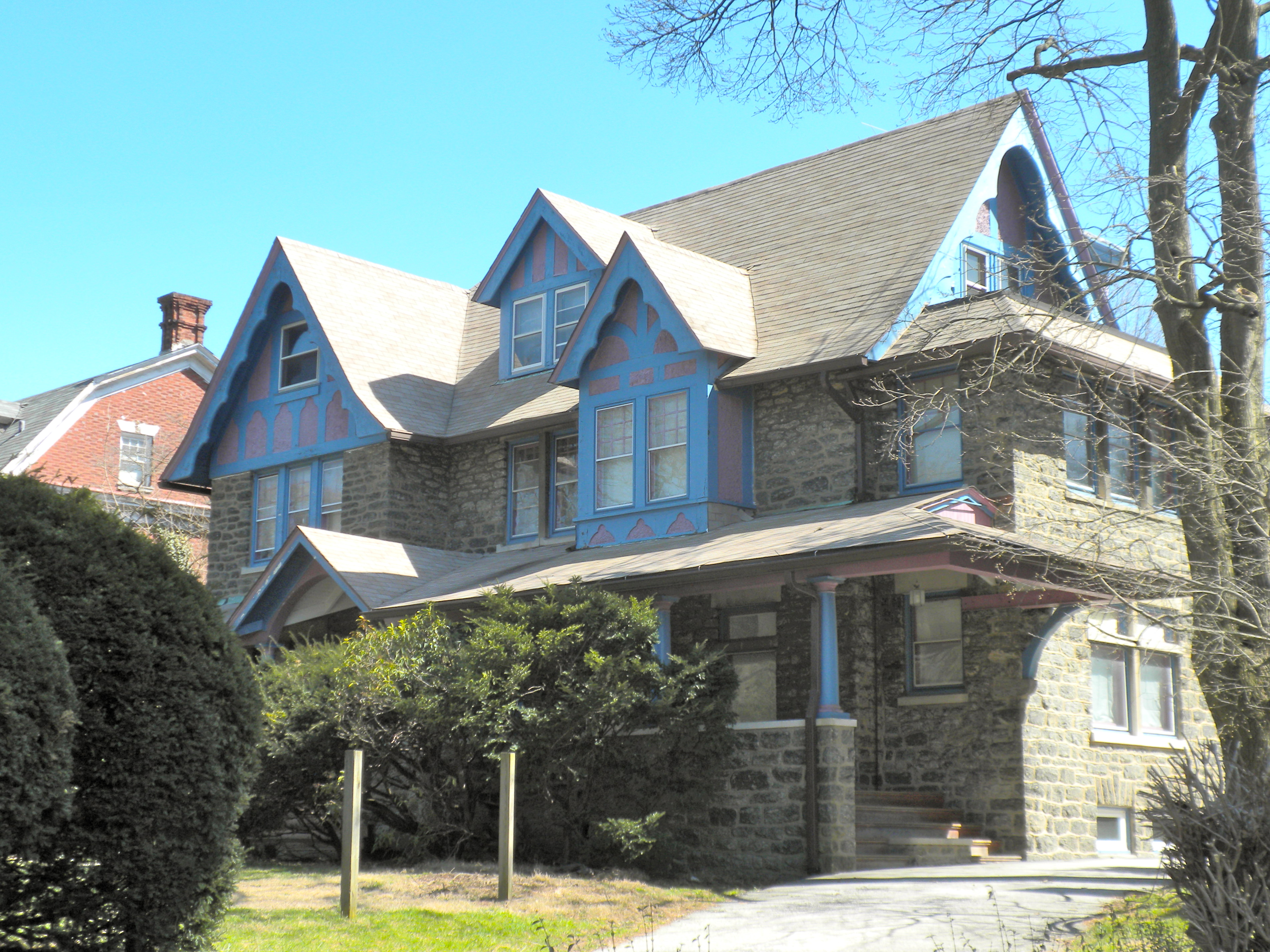
House on Overbrook Avenue

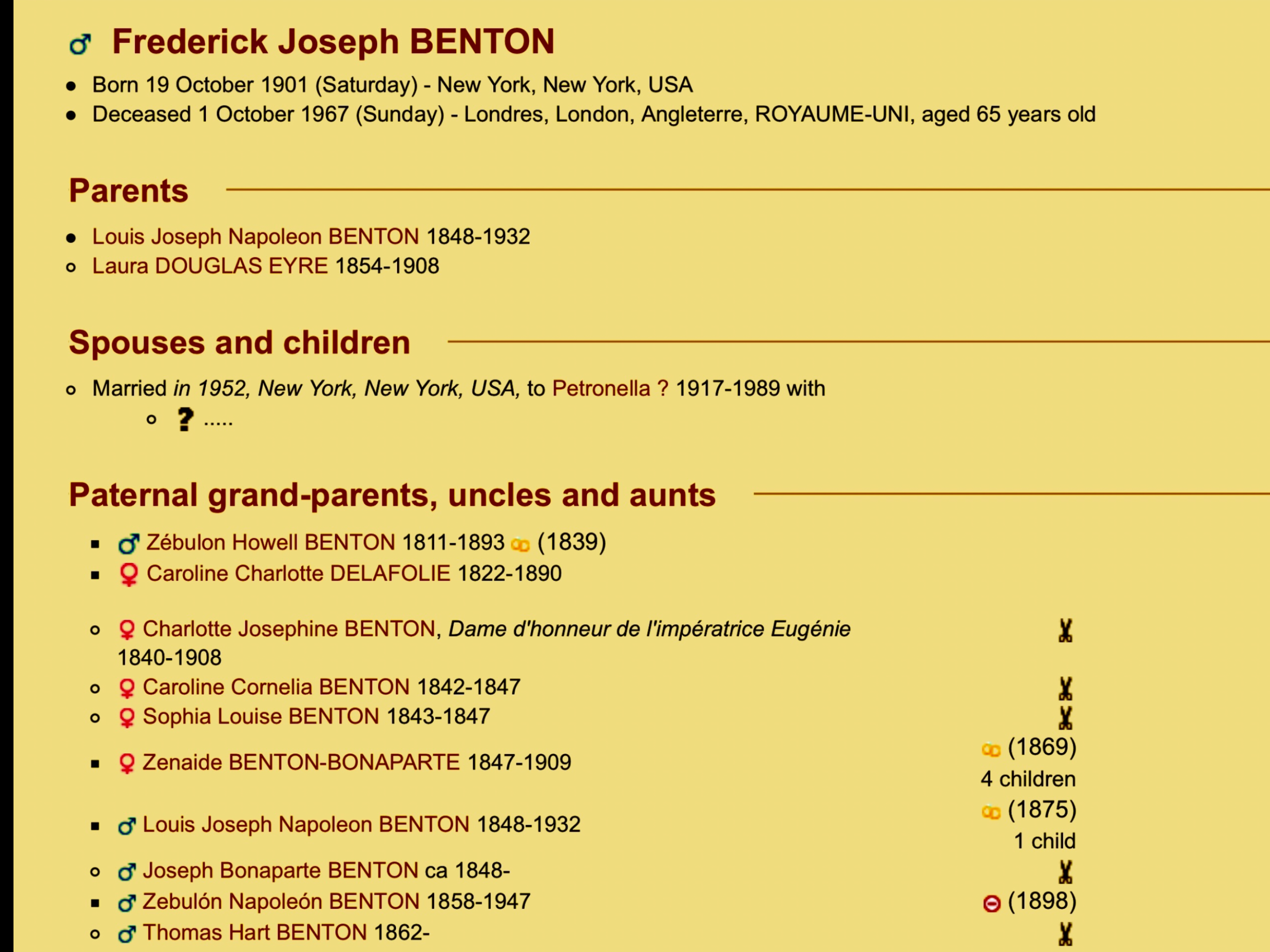
Notable residents included the Benton family descendants of former king Joseph Napoleon Bonaparte

Overbrook Farms is a neighborhood that is situated on the western edge of the West Philadelphia section of Philadelphia, Pennsylvania, United States. It is roughly bounded by City Avenue (U.S. Route 1), 58th Street, Woodbine Avenue, and 66th Street at Morris Park.

The neighborhood is bisected by Lancaster Avenue (U.S. Route 30) and the original Pennsylvania Railroad "main line". Today, the rail line is used by both Amtrak passenger service and SEPTA's commuter Paoli/Thorndale Line.

== History ==
This region of Philadelphia and its suburbs were originally settled by Welsh immigrants, who purchased land from William Penn. Two of these farms contributed land for what became the Overbrook Farms neighborhood, which was developed beginning in 1892. The neighborhood is often incorrectly considered to be a sub-section of the larger and densely developed Overbrook neighborhood.

Overbrook Farms was the first of several planned communities at were established along the Main Line of the Pennsylvania Railroad. The Overbrook Farms Company was the developer; its officers had links to directors of the Girard and Drexel banks and the Penn Railroad. This planned community includes some of the first residential projects by the first graduating class of the University of Pennsylvania's architectural program.

Overbrook Farms maintains the oldest continually operating neighborhood association in the United States, the Overbrook Farms Club (OFC). OFC sponsors an annual house tour each Spring. The neighborhood was designated as a National Historic District and is listed on the National Register of Historic Places. Its description and statement of significance can be found at "Overbrook Farms", Historic Districts. Overbrook Farms, Its Historical Background, Growth and Community Life (1936) by Tello J. d'Apery, M.D. also provides a complete history of the area.

A more recent development of smaller homes with modern incursions, called Greenhill Farms, is not included within the historic district. This development extends from 66th Street to 72nd Street. Bordered on three sides by Morris Park and on the west by City Avenue, it includes some original mansions built on Wistar Morris' gentleman's farm. The City Line Avenue Bridge was listed on the National Register of Historic Places in 1988.

== Public libraries ==
The Free Library of Philadelphia operates the Wynnefield Branch nearby.
