= Mercantile Library Company (Philadelphia) =

Library in Philadelphia, Pennsylvania, U.S. (1821–1989)

Mercantile Library
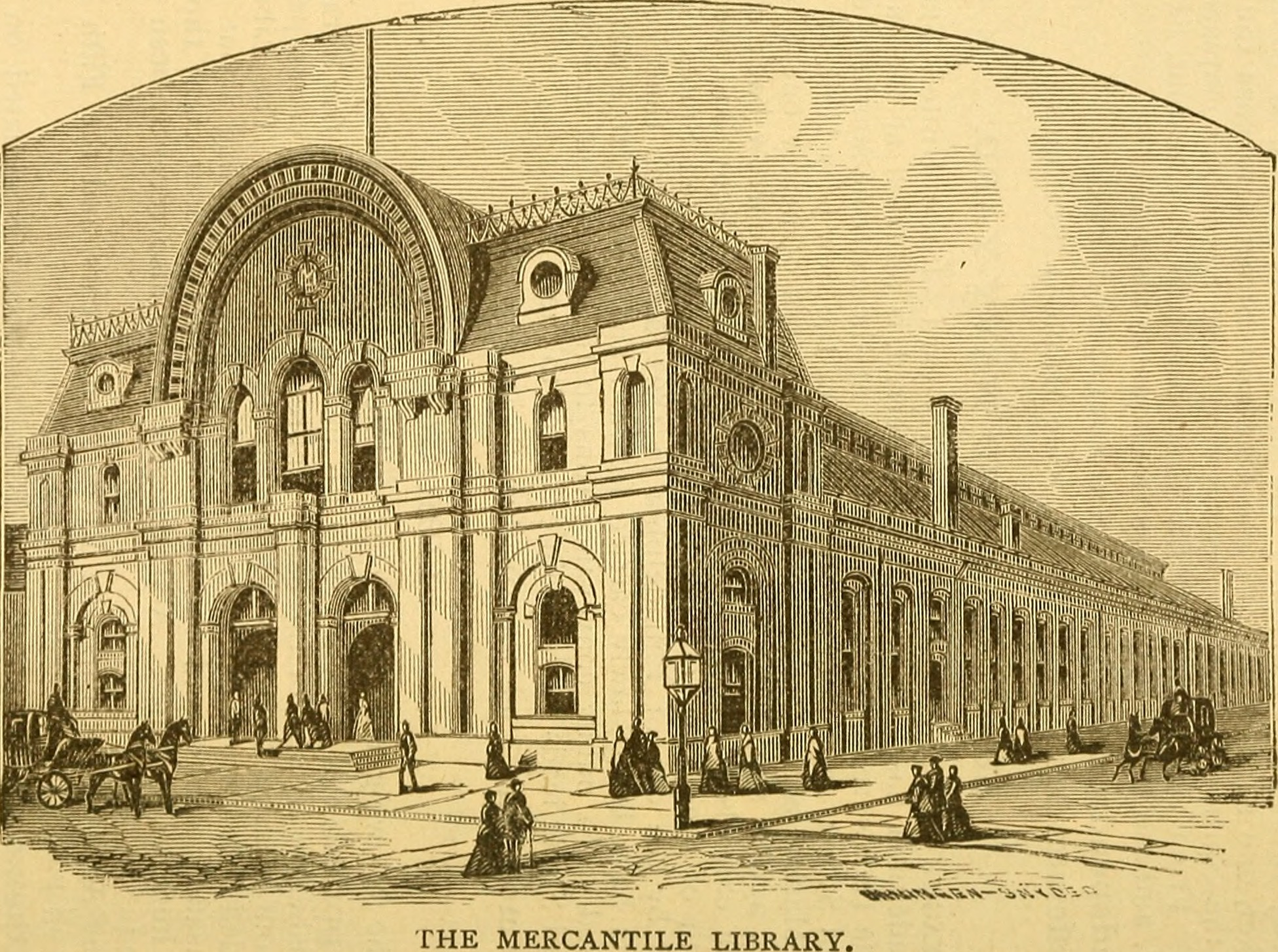
- The second Mercantile Library building on Tenth Street in 1876. It was replaced by the Chestnut Street building in 1952 and was promptly demolished.
- 39°57′01″N 75°09′28″W
- Location: 125 South Fifth Street, Philadelphia, Pennsylvania, United States (1845–1869) Tenth Street, Philadelphia, Pennsylvania, U.S. (1869–1952) 1021–1023 Chestnut Street, Philadelphia, Pennsylvania, U.S. (1952–1989)
- Established: 1821
- Closed: 1989
- Architects: William L. Johnston (first building) Frank Furness (second building) Martin, Stewart & Noble (third building)
- Branch of: Free Library of Philadelphia (circa unknown point after 1894)

The Mercantile Library Company was a library in Philadelphia, Pennsylvania, United States, that operated from 1821 to 1989. Like other "Mercantile Libraries" of the era, it was originally a subscription library focused on serving merchants, but gradually shifted focus over time to serve more as a public library, and ultimately became a freely-accessible branch of the Free Library of Philadelphia. The library moved to three different locations during its 168 years of existence, but only the third library building, opened in 1952, still stands; this building was added to the Philadelphia Register of Historic Places in 1990.

== History ==
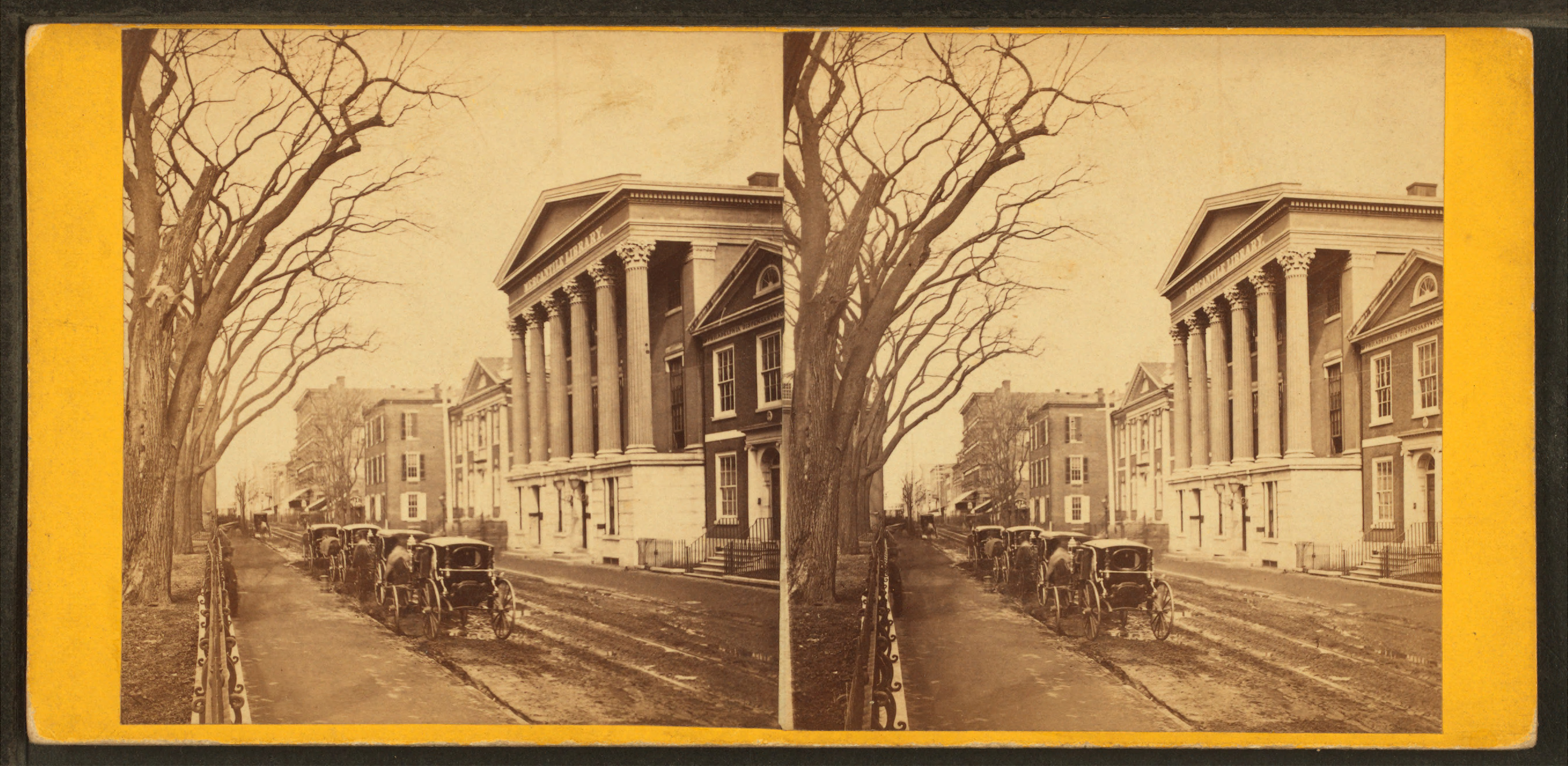
The first Mercantile Library building at Fifth Street and Library Street in 1868.

The Mercantile Library was founded in 1821. In 1845, after years of having impermanent locations, it housed itself at the Mercantile Library building on Fifth Street. Per its name, the library was primarily intended to serve merchants with documents on trade, business, and commerce, though library catalogs from later in the century indicate the library soon held books on other subjects.

In 1869, the library's growing membership and book collection prompted a move to another location on Tenth Street. In 1877, the Mercantile Library building caught fire when a blaze from the neighboring Fox's American Theatre spread to its roof, and some of the library's collection was damaged from the fire as well as from water used in firefighting efforts by the Philadelphia Fire Department.

By the 1880s, the Mercantile Library had long since become considerably popular outside its original membership base of merchants, and the librarians chose to lean into this and curate expanded novel collections to match public demand, though they were especially selective to enforce public morality at the time. At an indeterminate point after 1894, the Mercantile Library was absorbed into the Free Library of Philadelphia and became a public library branch.

In 1952, the Mercantile Library moved to a newer building at 1021–1023 Chestnut Street, the site of the former Chestnut Street Opera House. In 1989, after 168 years of operation, the Mercantile Library was forced to close after asbestos was discovered in the building. The Free Library of Philadelphia absorbed the collections of the Mercantile Library after its closure.

== Architecture ==
Initially, the Mercantile Library was housed at multiple different locations that are not clearly known and may no longer exist. From 1845 to 1869, the library was housed in a dedicated Greek Revival building at 125 South Fifth Street and Library Street, designed by William L. Johnston. After the library moved to its second location in 1869, the first building at Fifth Street was converted into offices, purchased by Horatio Nelson Burroughs in the 1870s as the Burroughs Building, and eventually demolished in 1925. Its former location is now an open area in Independence National Historical Park, with nothing indicating there was once a building there.

The second Mercantile Library building was opened in 1869, designed by Frank Furness. The library was converted out of a disused market building and was renovated by Furness twice, first in 1873 (with George W. Hewitt) and again after the fire in 1877. When the library moved to the Chestnut Street building in 1952, the now-vacant second building, which was located somewhat nearby, was demolished to construct a large parking garage for the area. The third Mercantile Library building at 1021–1023 Chestnut Street was a two-story Modern building with a clean windowed front, designed by Martin, Stewart & Noble.

== Legacy ==
The third and final Mercantile Library building is still standing at 1021 Chestnut Street, but remains vacant and boarded up. It was placed on the Philadelphia Register of Historic Places in 1990, and was the first mid-20th century building on the list.

== See also ==
- John Edmands (librarian)
- List of libraries in 19th century Philadelphia
