= List of libraries in 19th-century Philadelphia =

The following is a list of libraries located in Philadelphia, Pennsylvania, active in the 19th century. Included are public libraries, academic libraries, medical libraries, church libraries, government libraries, circulating libraries, and subscription libraries.

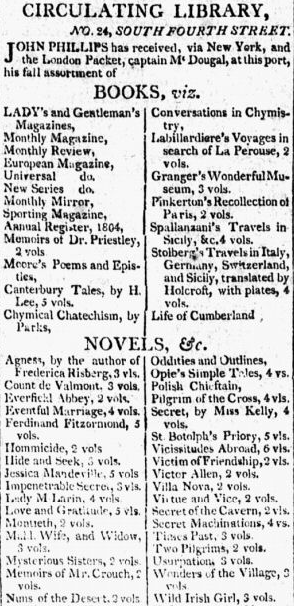
Advertisement for John Phillips' circulating library, Philadelphia, 1806

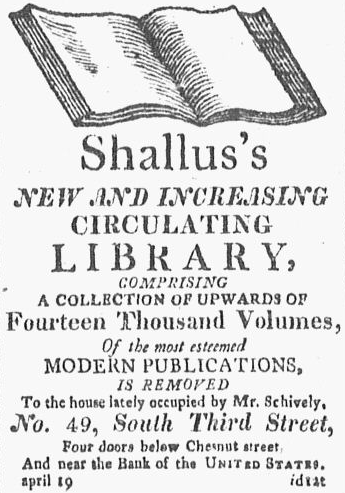
Advertisement for Shallus's Circulating Library, Philadelphia, 1811

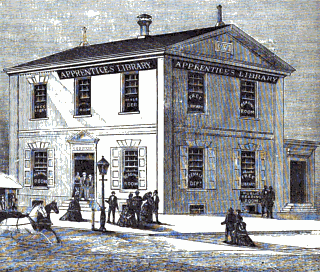
Apprentices Library, Philadelphia, 19th century

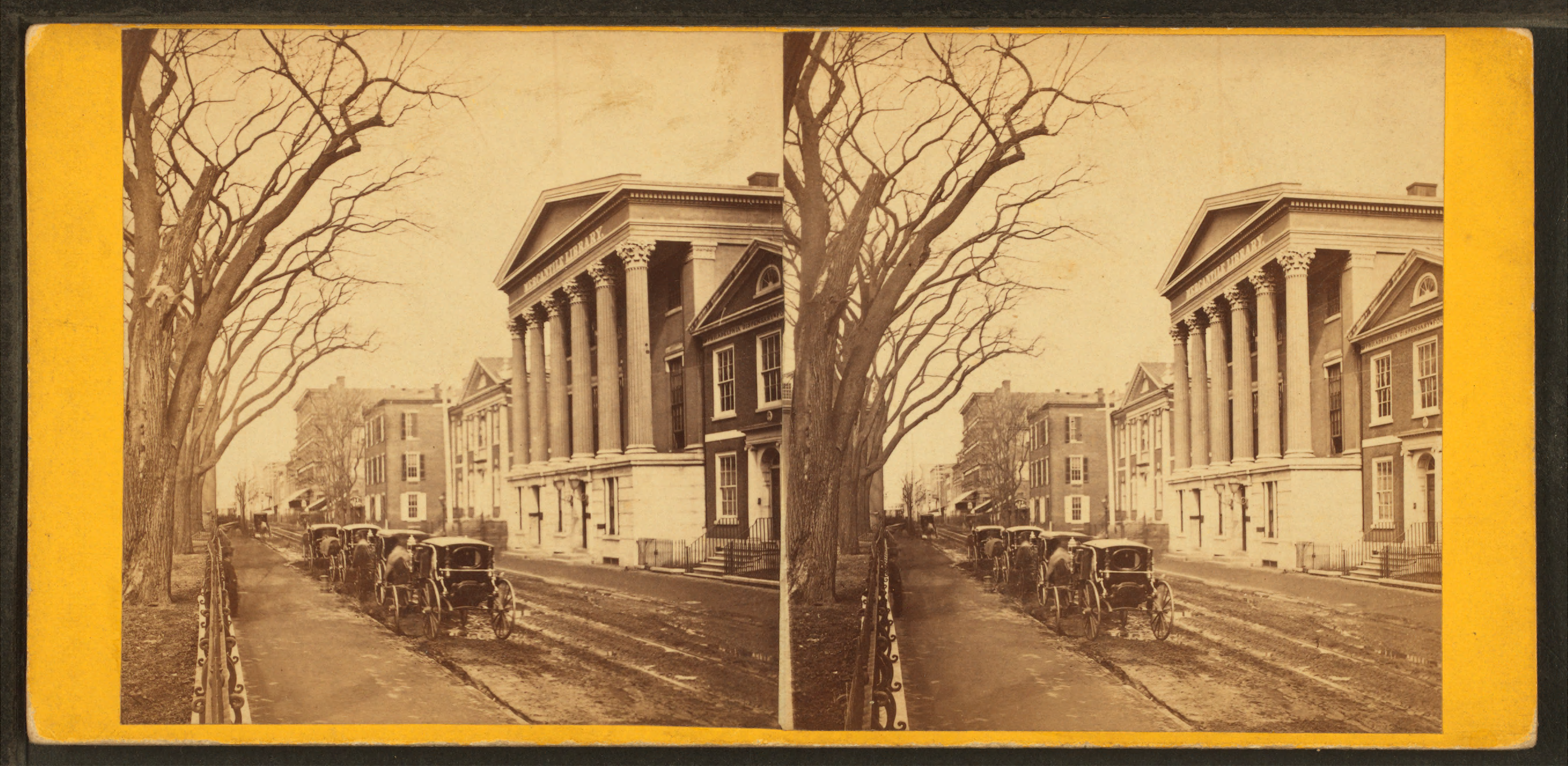
Mercantile Library, 19th century

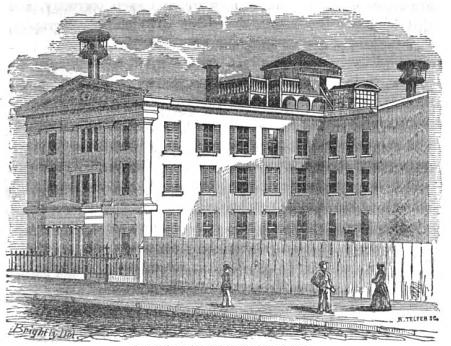
Central High School, Philadelphia, c. 1852

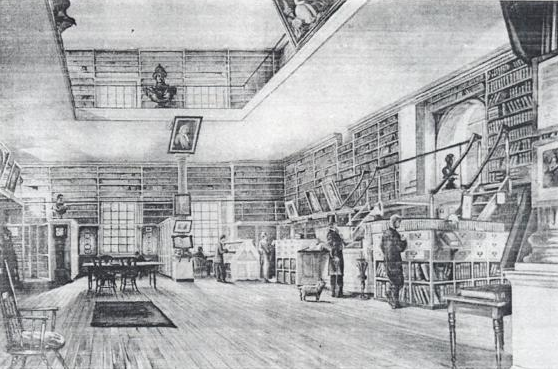
Interior, Library Company of Philadelphia, 1859

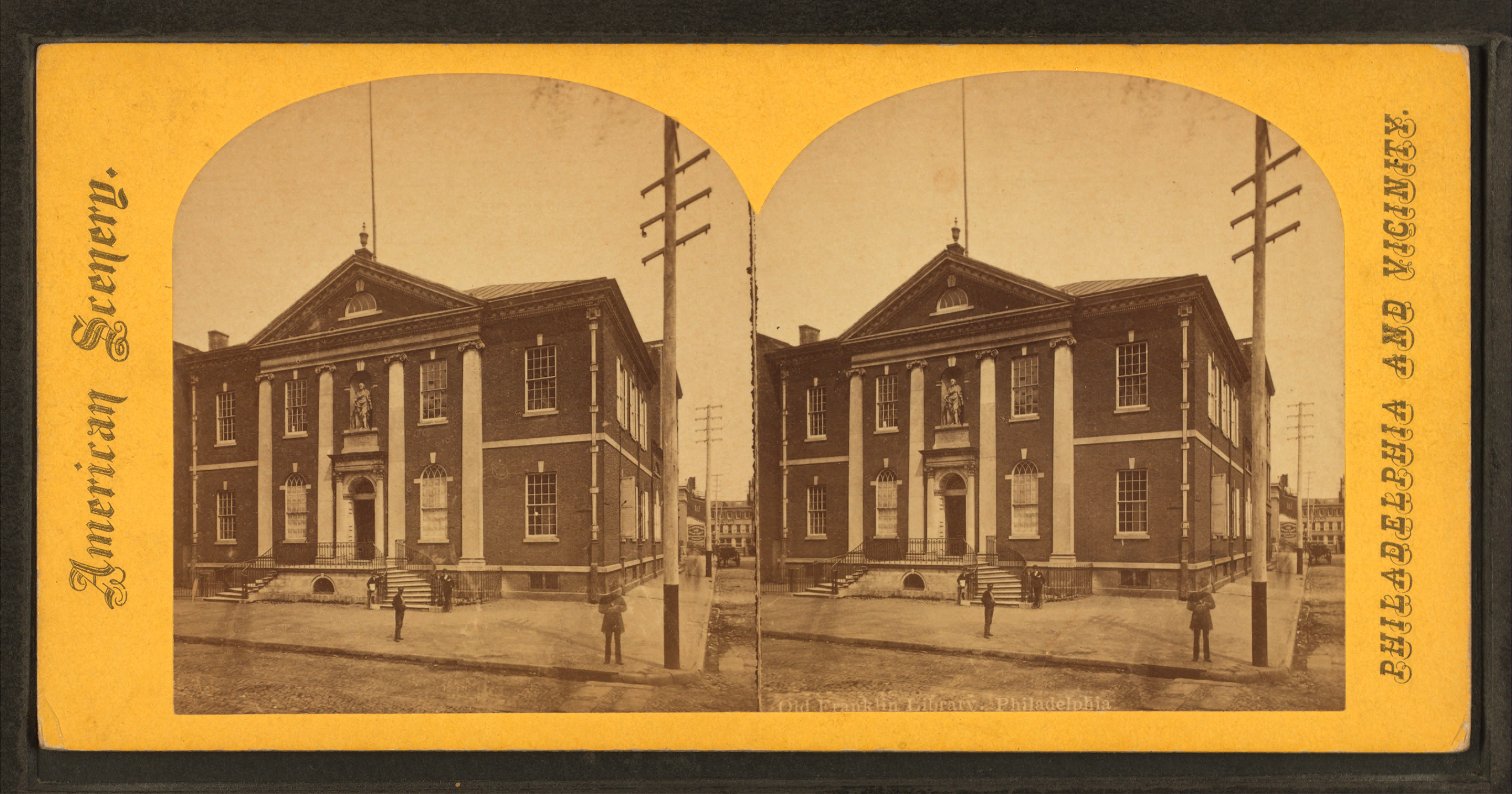
Library Company of Philadelphia (built 1790). The library occupied this building until 1880

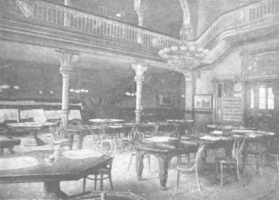
Reading Room, YMCA, c. 1893

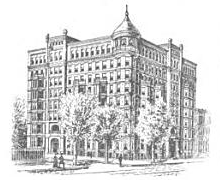
Women's Christian Association, c. 1894

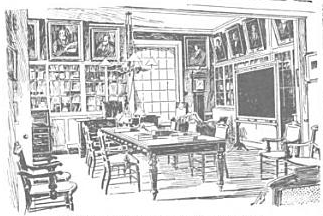
Interior, American Philosophical Society, 1890s

A

- Academy of Natural Sciences
- Agnes Irwin's School
- Almshouse library
- American Baptist Historical Society
- American Baptist Publication Society
- American Catholic Historical Society
- American Entomological Society
- American Institute of Architects, Philadelphia Chapter
- American Philosophical Society (est. 1743).
- American Sunday-School Union
- Apprentices' Library Company
- Athenaeum of Philadelphia

B

- Baptist Historical Society
- George E. Blake's circulating library
- Board of Missions of Presbyterian Church
- Boarding and Day School for Young Ladies
- Broad Street Academy Library
- Brotherhead's Circulating Library
- Burd Orphan Asylum
- Byberry Library

C

- Carpenters' Company
- Catholic Philopatrian Society
- Central High School
- Chalk's Circulating Library, North Third St.
- Challen's Circulating Library
- Chase's Circulating Library
- Chestnut Hill Free Library
- Chestnut St. Female Seminary
- Christ Church Hospital
- Christ Church Library
- Christian Hall Library Company
- Church of the Holy Apostle, Sunday School Library
- College Avenue Anat. School
- College of Physicians of Philadelphia
- College of St. Thomas of Villa Nova
- Colored Reading Society
- Controllers of Public Schools Library
- Edward Corfield's circulating library

D

- Disston Library
- Drexel Institute Library (est.1891)

E

- Eastburn Academy Library
- Eastern State Penitentiary
- Eclectic Medical College
- Edwin Forrest Home
- Engineers Club
- Episcopal Library and Reading Room

F

- Female Medical College
- Florence Lit. Inst. and Library
- Franklin Institute
- Franklin Library Association
- Free Circulating Library for the Blind
- Free Library of Philadelphia (est.1891, opened 1894). Main branch located in City Hall (1894), then in Concert Hall (1895–1910)
  - College Settlement branch
  - Evening Home branch
  - West Philadelphia branch
- Free Reading-Room Association of Spring Garden
- Friends' Asylum for the Insane
- Friends' Library
- Friends' Observatory

G

- George Institute
- German Society of Pennsylvania
- Germantown Library
- Girard College
- Paul Girard's French Circulating Library
- Girl's Normal School Library
- Grand Army Republic, Post No.2
- Grand Lodge of Pennsylvania F.A.A.M.
- D. Guillemet's French Circulating Library

H

- Hahnemann Medical College
- Harwood's Circulating Library
- Hebrew Literature Society
- Historical Society of Pennsylvania
- Home Teaching and Free Circulating Library for the Blind
- Homoeopathic Medical College
- House of Refuge
- Hirst Free Law Library

I

- Institute for Colored Youth
- Institution for the Blind
- Institution for Deaf and Dumb
- Irish Library of the Cathedral

J

- James Page Library Company
- Jefferson Medical College

K

- Kensington Literary Institute (est.1853)

L

- La Salle College
- Law Association of Philadelphia
- Leopold's Circulating Library
- Library and Reading Room Association of 23rd Ward (est.1857)
- Library Association of Friends
- Library Company of Colored Persons
- Library Company of Philadelphia (est. 1731), also called the Philadelphia Library
  - Ridgway Branch
- Library of Foreign Classical Literature and Science
- Library of the Four Monthly Meetings of Friends
- Lovett Memorial Free Library

M

- Mantua Academy
- Mariners' Church Library for Seamen
- Sarah McDonald's circulating library, S. 11th St.
- Mechanics' Institute of Southwark
- Medical Institute of Philadelphia
- Medico-Chirurgical College
- Memorial Free Library (Mount Airy)
- Mercantile Library Company
- Ann Miller's circulating library
- Moyamensing Literary Institute (est.1852)
- Mutual Library Co.

N

- New Church Book Association
- North Broad Street Select School
- Northern Dispensary of Philadelphia
- Northern Home
- Northern Liberties Franklin Library
- Northern Liberties Library and Reading Room Co. (est.1830)
- Numismatic and Antiquarian Society

O

- Odd Fellows' Library

P

- Page Library
- Peirce College of Business
- Pennsylvania Academy of the Fine Arts
- Pennsylvania College, Medical Dept.
- Pennsylvania College of Dental Surgery
- Pennsylvania Horticultural Society
- Pennsylvania Hospital Medical Library
- Pennsylvania Hospital for the Insane
- Pennsylvania Institution for Deaf and Dumb
- Pennsylvania Seamen's Friend Society
- Philadelphia Board of Trade
- Philadelphia City Institute
- The Philadelphia Club Library
- Philadelphia College of Dental Surgery
- Philadelphia College of Medicine
- Philadelphia College of Pharmacy
- Philadelphia County Prison
- Philadelphia Divinity School
- Philadelphia Hospital Library
- Philadelphia Library Association of Colored Brethren
- Philadelphia Maritime Exchange
- Philadelphia Museum library
- Philadelphia Public Library (est.1892), administered by the city Board of Education. Also called City Library
  - Branch no.1: Montgomery Ave. and 17th St.
  - Branch no.2: Broad and Federal St.
  - Branch no.3: Frankfort Ave.
  - Branch no.4: Roxboro
  - Branch no.5: West Philadelphia Institute, 40th St.
  - Branch no.6: Main St. and Chelten Ave., Germantown
- Philadelphia School of Anatomy
- Philadelphia Seminary
- Philadelphia Society for Promoting Agriculture
- Philadelphia Turngemeinde
- Philips' Circulating Library, Third St.
- John Phillips' circulating library, South Fourth St.
- Polytechnic College
- Mrs. S. Potts' circulating library, Walnut St.
- Presbyterian Board of Publication
- Presbyterian Historical Society
- Presbyterian Home for Widows and Single Women
- Public Library for People of Color

R

- Roxborough Lyceum

S

- St. Joseph's College
- St. Timothy's Workingmen's Club and Institute
- Seamen's and Landsmen's Aid Society
- Shallus's Circulating Library
- Social Art Club
- Society of Students' library
- Southwark Library Company (est.1822)
- Spring Garden Institute (est.1835)

T

- Teachers' Institute of Philadelphia
- Theological Seminary (Mount Airy)
- Theological Seminary Reformed Presbyterian Church
- Theological Seminary St. Charles of Boromeo
- Three Monthly Meetings of Friends

U

- Union Circulating Library
- Union League Library
- United States Mint
- United States Naval Home
- United States Navy Yard
- Universal Peace Union
- University of Pennsylvania
  - Furness Library
  - Law Department
  - Medical Department

W

- Wagner Free Institute of Science
- Walnut St. Female Seminary
- West Philadelphia Institute
- Western Library Association of Philadelphia (est.1854)
- Wills Hospital
- Wilson's Circulating Library, South 11th St.
- Wistar Medical College
- Women's Christian Association
- Women's Hospital

Y

- YMCA Philadelphia
- Young Men's Institute

== See also ==
- Books in the United States
- Culture of Philadelphia
- List of libraries in the United States
