= South Philadelphia Library =

Coordinates: 39.92904°N 75.16914°W

The South Philadelphia Library is a library in Philadelphia, Pennsylvania, United States. It is a branch of the Free Library of Philadelphia. The South Philadelphia Library is one of six public libraries in the South Philadelphia neighborhood.

== History ==
In 1914, the South Philadelphia branch became the 16th branch of the Free Library to be built with funds donated by Andrew Carnegie. This branch is currently located in the Community Health and Literacy Center at Broad and Morris Street. The original South Philadelphia branch was located at Broad and Ritner Streets and opened on November 24, 1914. It was relocated to its current location in 1965 and the previous location became the Ritner Children’s Library. In 1999, it was incorporated into an adjoining community center as a multi-purpose room. The community center which housed the library was demolished in 2014; and in 2016 a new building that combines health, recreational, and literacy services was opened on the same site, becoming the South Philadelphia Health and Literacy Center, incorporating the new South Philadelphia Library branch. In June 2016 the new South Philadelphia Library reopened to the public. It was the first of five pilot neighborhood libraries to be reimagined and reshaped to meet the changing needs of today’s library customers. The library occupies nearly 12,000 square feet, hosting over 150,000 customers annually. It also features child and adult literacy classes, free Wi-Fi, public computers, computer literacy classes, and ESL classes with staff trained by the University of Pennsylvania Center for Public Health Initiatives. In 2019 South Philadelphia Library was designated a Zone of Peace by the Religious Leaders Council of Greater Philadelphia for its work in answering the call to stop violence by creating zones of peace and learning for the neighborhood.
