= John Edmands (librarian) =

American librarian

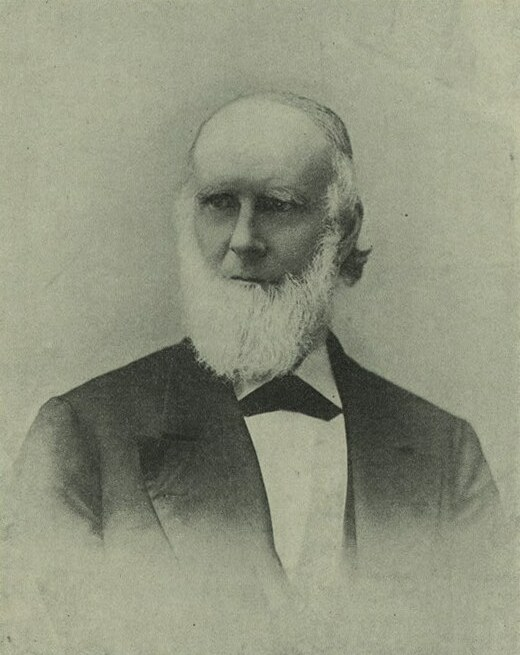
- Born: February 1, 1820; Framingham, Massachusetts
- Died: October 17, 1915 (aged 95)
- Education: Phillips Academy; Yale College (1847); Yale Divinity School (1851)
- Occupation: Librarian
- Employer(s): Mercantile Library Company; Yale University

John Edmands (February 1, 1820 – October 17, 1915) was an American librarian who was responsible for innovations in filing methodologies. He inspired Poole's guide to periodical literature.

He was born in Framingham, Massachusetts, graduated from Phillips Academy, Andover, and then Yale College in 1847, and taught at Rocky Mount, North Carolina for a year before resuming study at Yale Divinity School from 1848 to 1851. He was librarian for the Yale Debating Society, Brothers in Unity from 1846 to 1847 and was assistant in the Yale College library from 1851 to 1856. He was followed in that position by William Frederick Poole, who developed Edmands's Subjects for Debates with Reference to Authorities into Poole's Index to Periodical Literature. In 1856 Edmands became chief librarian of the Mercantile Library, Philadelphia.

He was one of the original members of the American Library Association, and one of its first vice presidents. He also served as head of the Association of Pennsylvania Librarians for several years.

== Publications ==
- "Subjects for debate, with references to authorities" (New Haven, 1847)
- "Historical sketch... the Central Congregational Church of Philadelphia" (E.E. Hayes & Co., 1894)
- "The Evolution of Congregationalism" (Free Press, 1916)
