= City Line Avenue Bridge =

- U.S. National Register of Historic Places
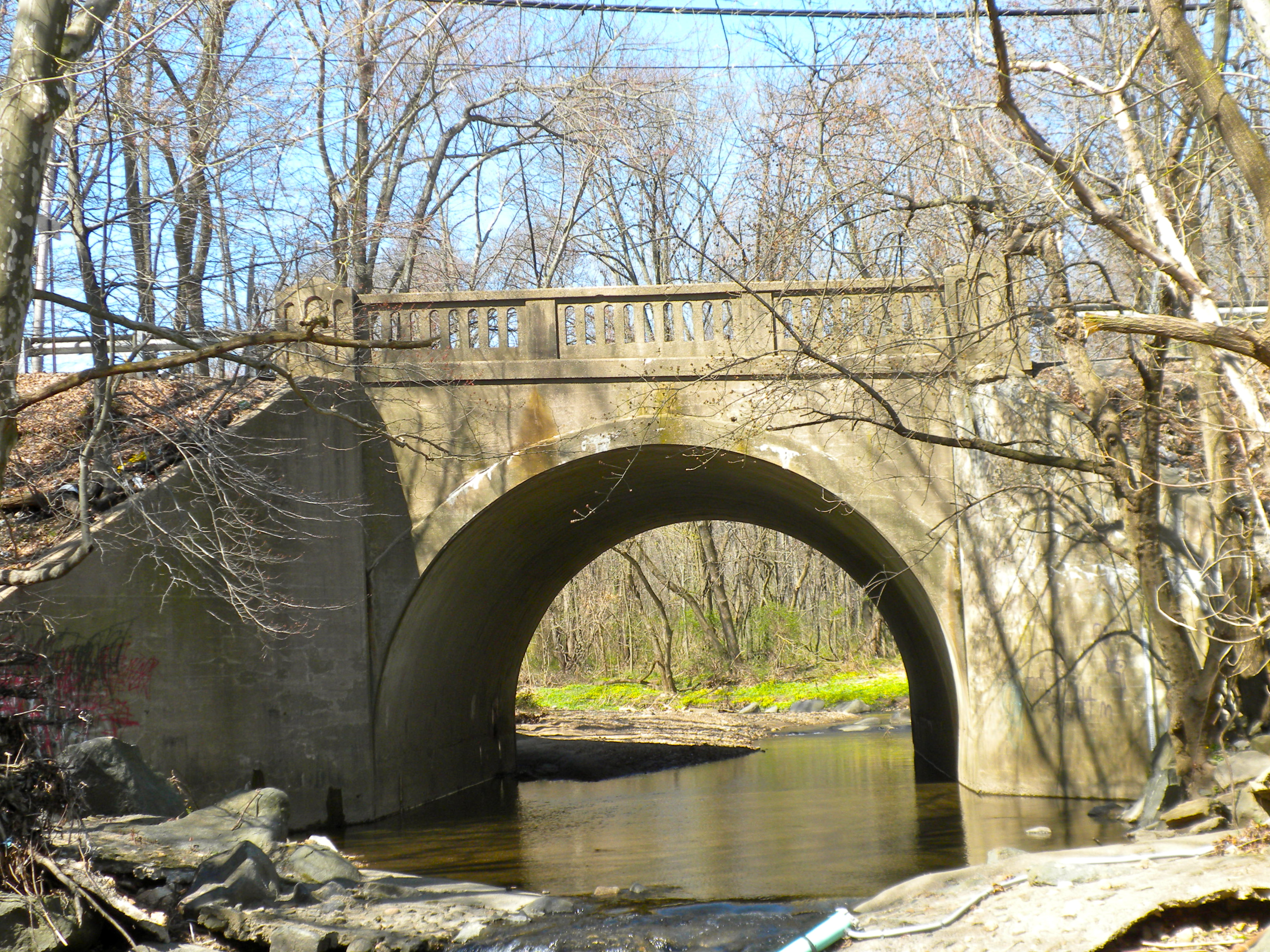
- City Line Avenue Bridge, March 2010

- Location within Philadelphia Location within Pennsylvania Location within the United States
- Location: City Ave. over E branch of Indian Creek, Philadelphia, Pennsylvania
- Coordinates: 39°59′7″N 75°15′33″W
- Area: less than one acre
- Built: 1913
- Built by: Patrick J. Lawler
- Architect: John H. Dager
- Architectural style: One-span solid barrel arch
- MPS: Highway Bridges Owned by the Commonwealth of Pennsylvania, Department of Transportation TR
- NRHP reference No.: 88000802
- Added to NRHP: June 22, 1988

City Line Avenue Bridge is a historic concrete barrel arch bridge spanning the East Branch of Indian Creek and located in the Overbrook Farms neighborhood of Philadelphia, Pennsylvania. It was built in 1913, and is a single-span bridge. The barrel arch measures 20-foot-wide (6.1 m).

It was added to the National Register of Historic Places in 1988.
