= Morris Park, Philadelphia =

City park in Philadelphia, Pennsylvania

Morris Park
- Interactive map of Morris Park
- Coordinates: 39.9798°N 075.2576°W
- Area: 147 acres

Morris Park is a neighborhood and park on the western edge of the West Philadelphia section of Philadelphia, Pennsylvania, United States.
