= Indian Creek (Cobbs Creek tributary) =

River in Pennsylvania, United States

Coordinates: 39.966502°N 75.260461°W

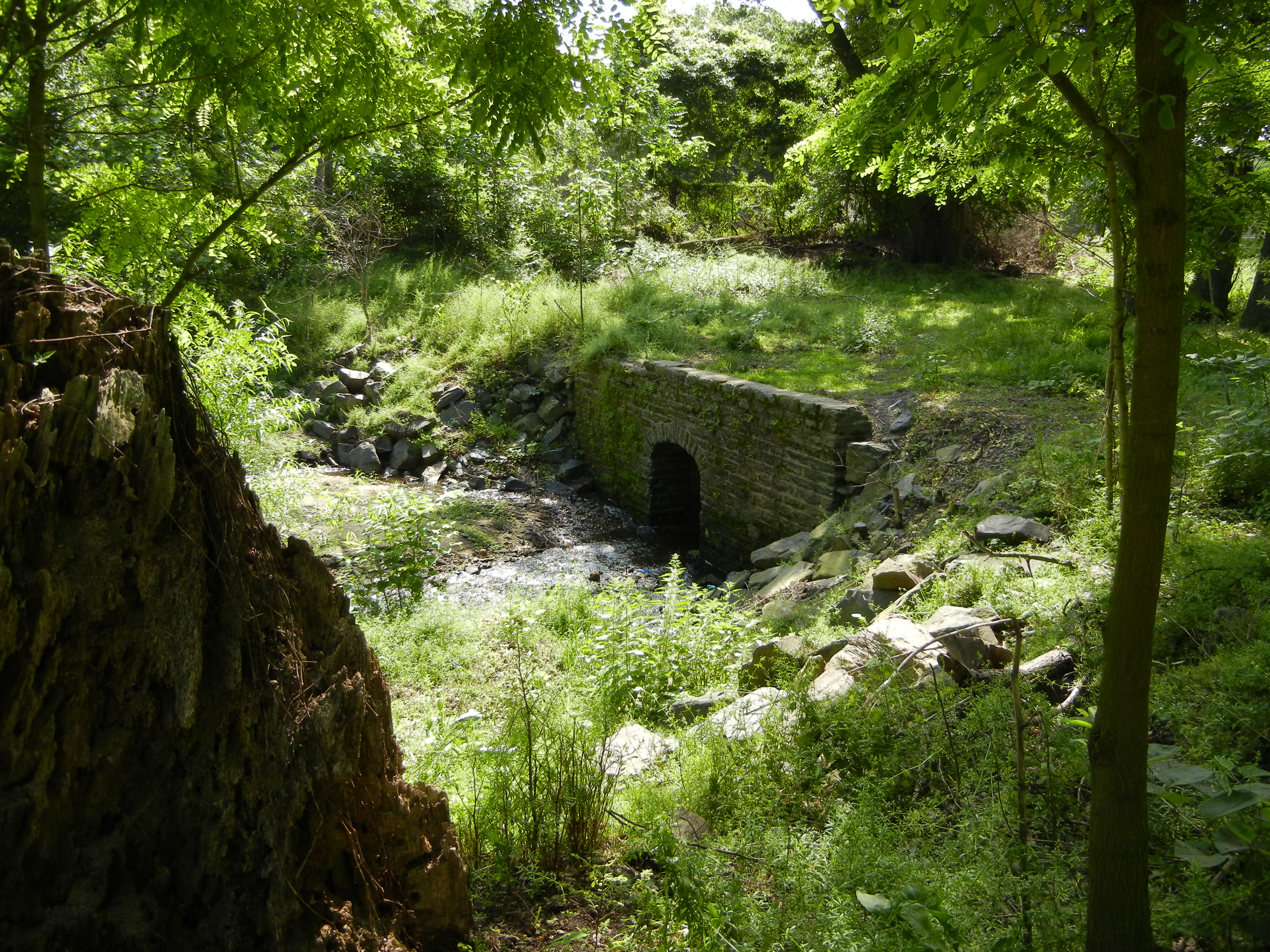
West branch, Indian Creek, entering the culvert in Morris Park

Indian Creek is a tributary of Cobbs Creek in the Philadelphia area of Pennsylvania in the United States.

Indian Creek has two branches that have their sources in Wynnewood, Montgomery County. The West Branch flows through the neighborhood of Penn Wynne and the East Branch flows through Narbrook Park, where it is exposed and has an open stream bed. It then passes through the Green Hill Condominiums. After flowing across City Line Avenue (U.S. Route 1) into Philadelphia, they enter Morris Park. Near Haverford Avenue both streams are piped underground, joining up beneath a recreational area within Morris park. The combined Indian Creek re-emerges on the south side of Haverford Avenue near 69th Street, and flows through more parkland and then the Cobbs Creek Golf Course, until it joins Cobbs Creek near the 69th Street Terminal, on the Upper Darby side of the banks of Cobbs Creek. The creek was once the site of a number of factories and mills.

== See also ==
- List of rivers of Pennsylvania
