= Overbrook Elementary School =

- Overbrook School
- U.S. National Register of Historic Places
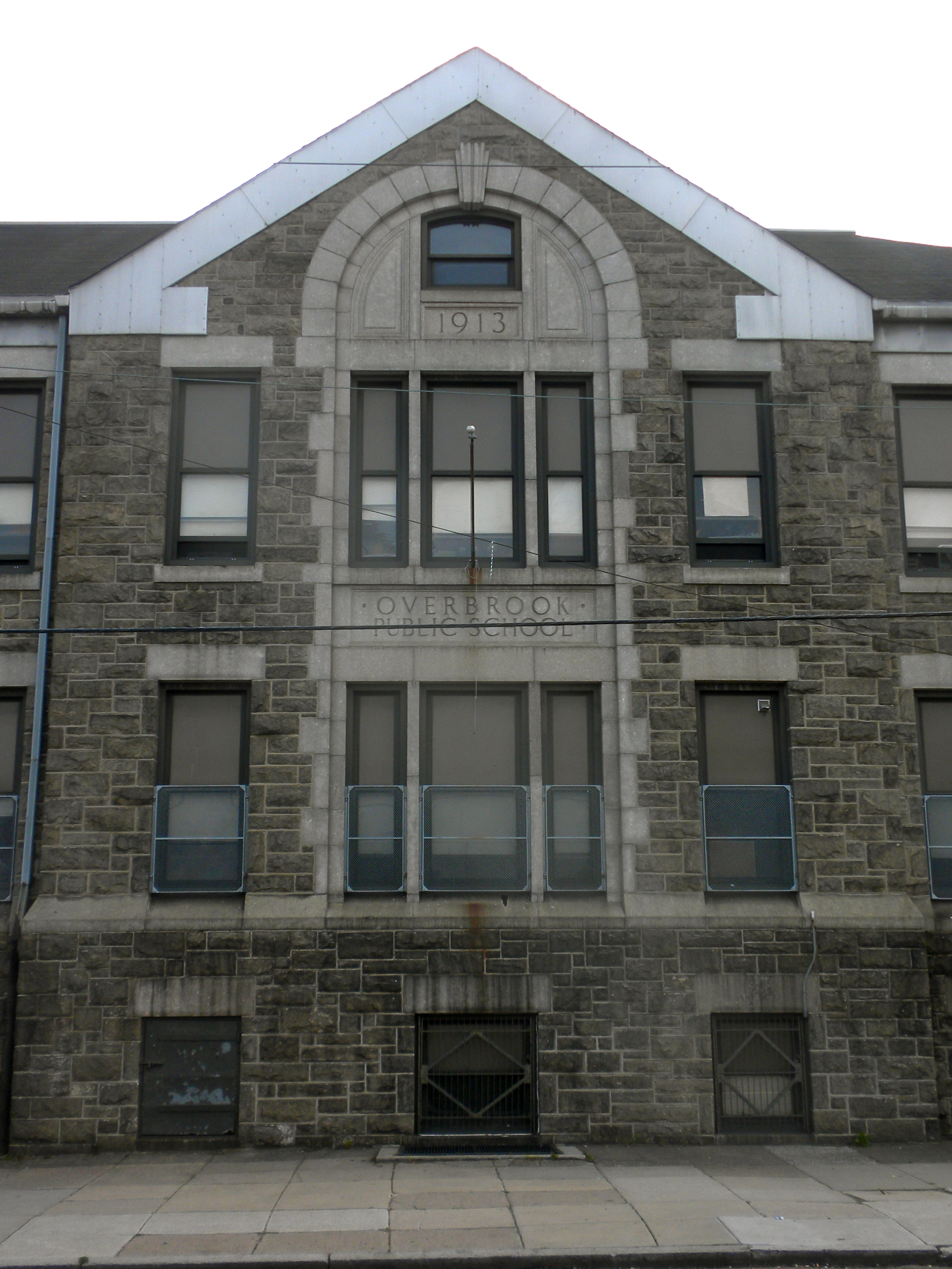
- Overbrook School, June 2010

- Location within Philadelphia Location within Pennsylvania Location within the United States
- Location: 2032 North 62nd Street, Philadelphia, Pennsylvania, United States
- Coordinates: 39°58′55″N 75°14′44″W
- Area: 2.5 acres (1.0 ha)
- Built: 1905–1907
- Built by: William J. Smith
- Architect: Lloyd Titus, Henry deCourcy Richards
- Architectural style: Colonial Revival
- MPS: Philadelphia Public Schools TR
- NRHP reference No.: 88002304
- Added to NRHP: November 18, 1988

The Overbrook Elementary School building is a historic elementary school located in the Overbrook neighborhood of Philadelphia, Pennsylvania, United States. It is part of the School District of Philadelphia.

This property was added to the National Register of Historic Places in 1988.

== History and architectural features ==
Built between 1905 and 1907, this historic structure is a two-story, nine-bay, brick building that was faced with granite. Designed in the Colonial Revival style, it sits on a raised basement. An eight-bay addition, which was designed by Henry deCourcy Richards, was built between 1913 and 1914. It features a slightly projecting front gable.
