= Overbrook High School (Philadelphia) =

- U.S. National Register of Historic Places
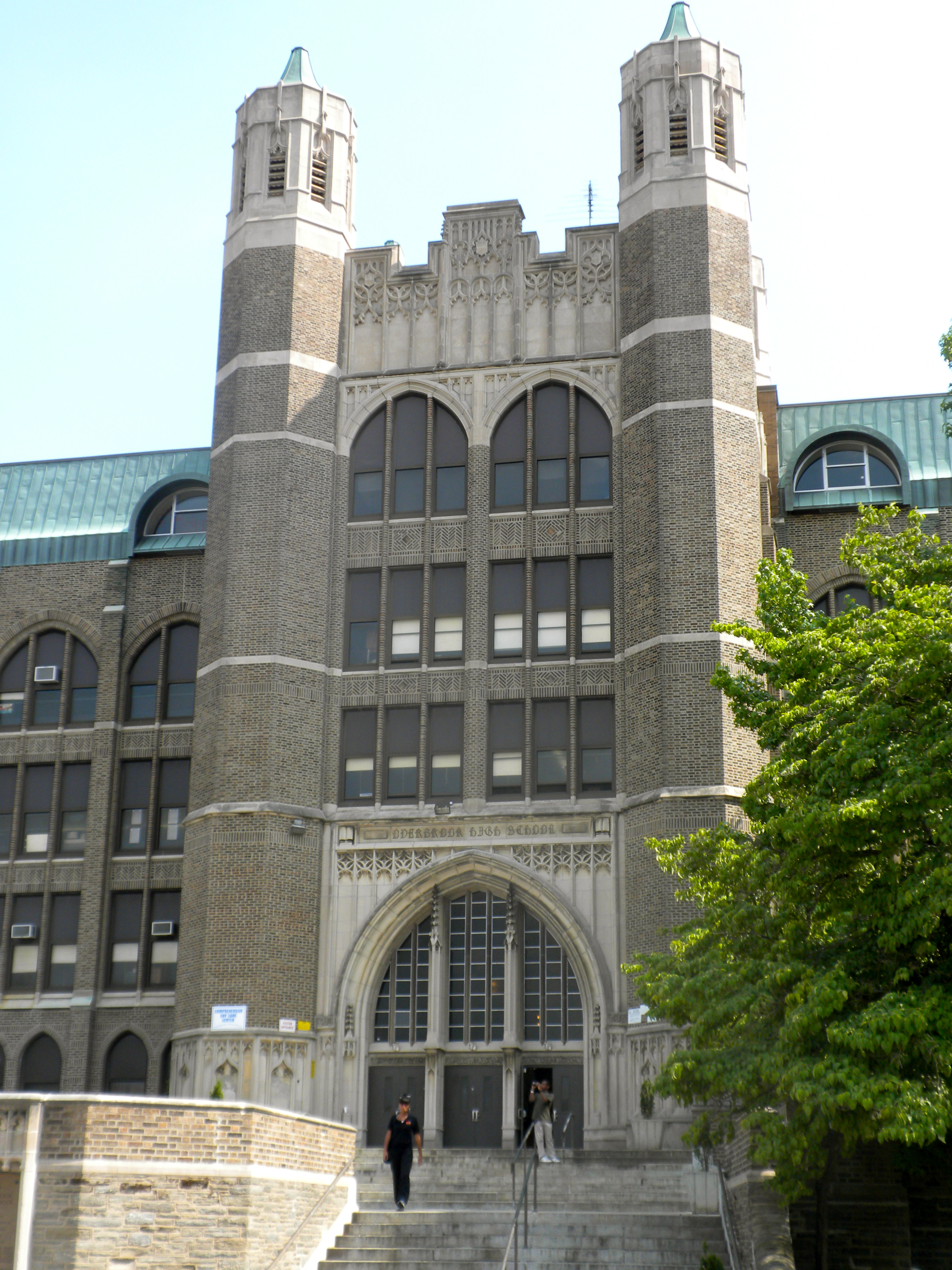
- Overbrook High School in Philadelphia

- Location within Philadelphia Location within Pennsylvania Location within the United States
- Location: 5898 Lancaster Ave., Philadelphia, Pennsylvania, U.S.
- Coordinates: 39.9812°N 75.2386°W
- Built: 1926
- Architect: Irwin T. Catharine
- Architectural style: Late Gothic Revival
- Website: overbrookhs.philasd.org
- MPS: School District of Philadelphia
- NRHP reference No.: 86003313
- Added to NRHP: December 4, 1986

Overbrook High School is a public, four-year high school in Philadelphia, Pennsylvania, United States. It is designated by the School District of Philadelphia as Location #402, in the West Region.

The building was built in 1926 and designed by Irwin T. Catharine. It was added to the National Register of Historic Places in 1986.

Enrollment for 2020–2021 was 5,111 students in grades 9 through 12. African Americans make up 96% of the student population. As of 2015, the school principal of Overbrook is Dr. Kahlila Johnson, who graduated from Overbrook in 1979.

== Notable alumni ==
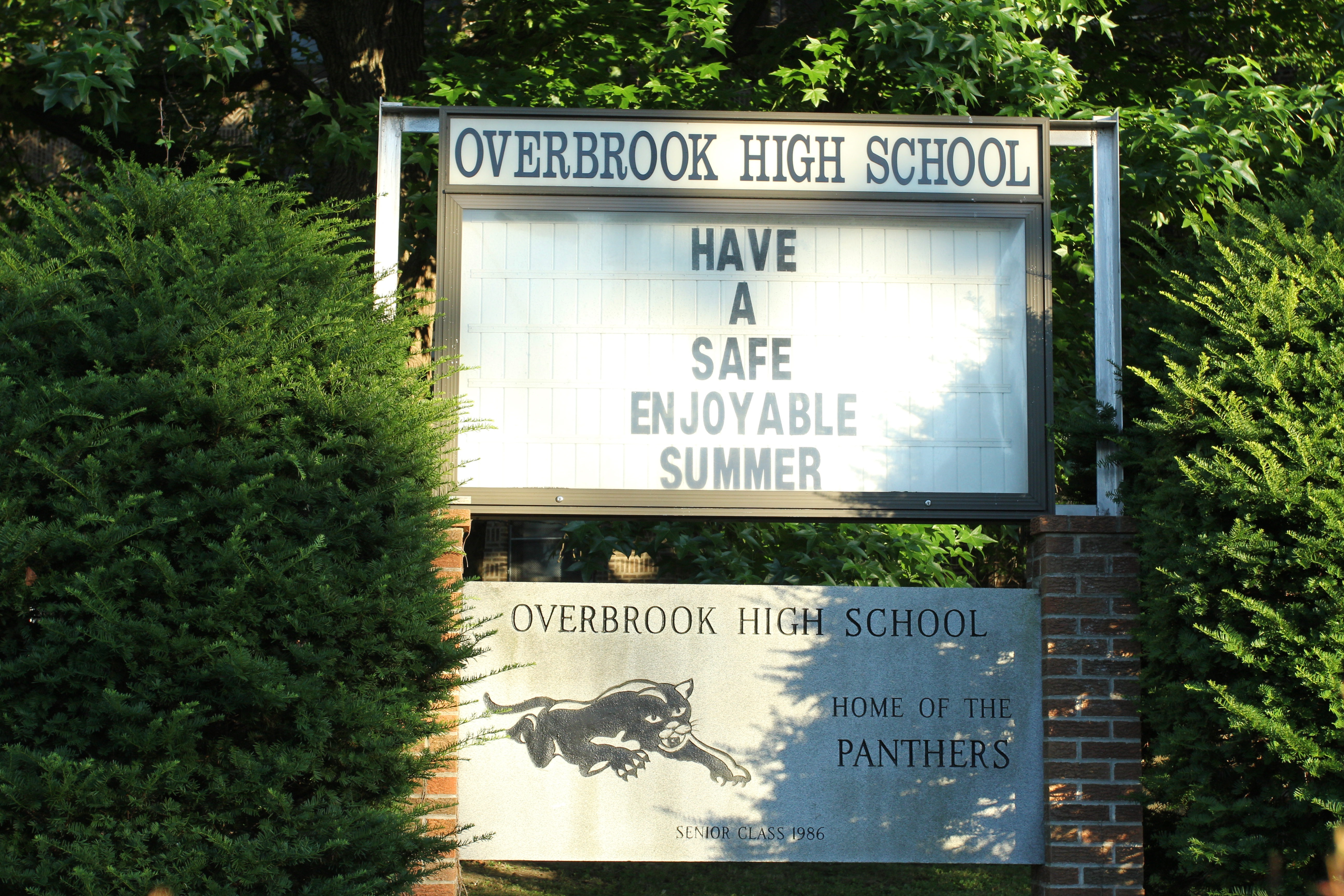
Overbrook HS sign

Overbrook is perhaps best known for its famous alumni, who include Wilt Chamberlain, Guion Bluford, Colman Domingo, Toukie Smith, First Choice, and Will Smith. At least 11 Overbrook alumni have played in the NBA, and the school is ranked sixth in that respect.

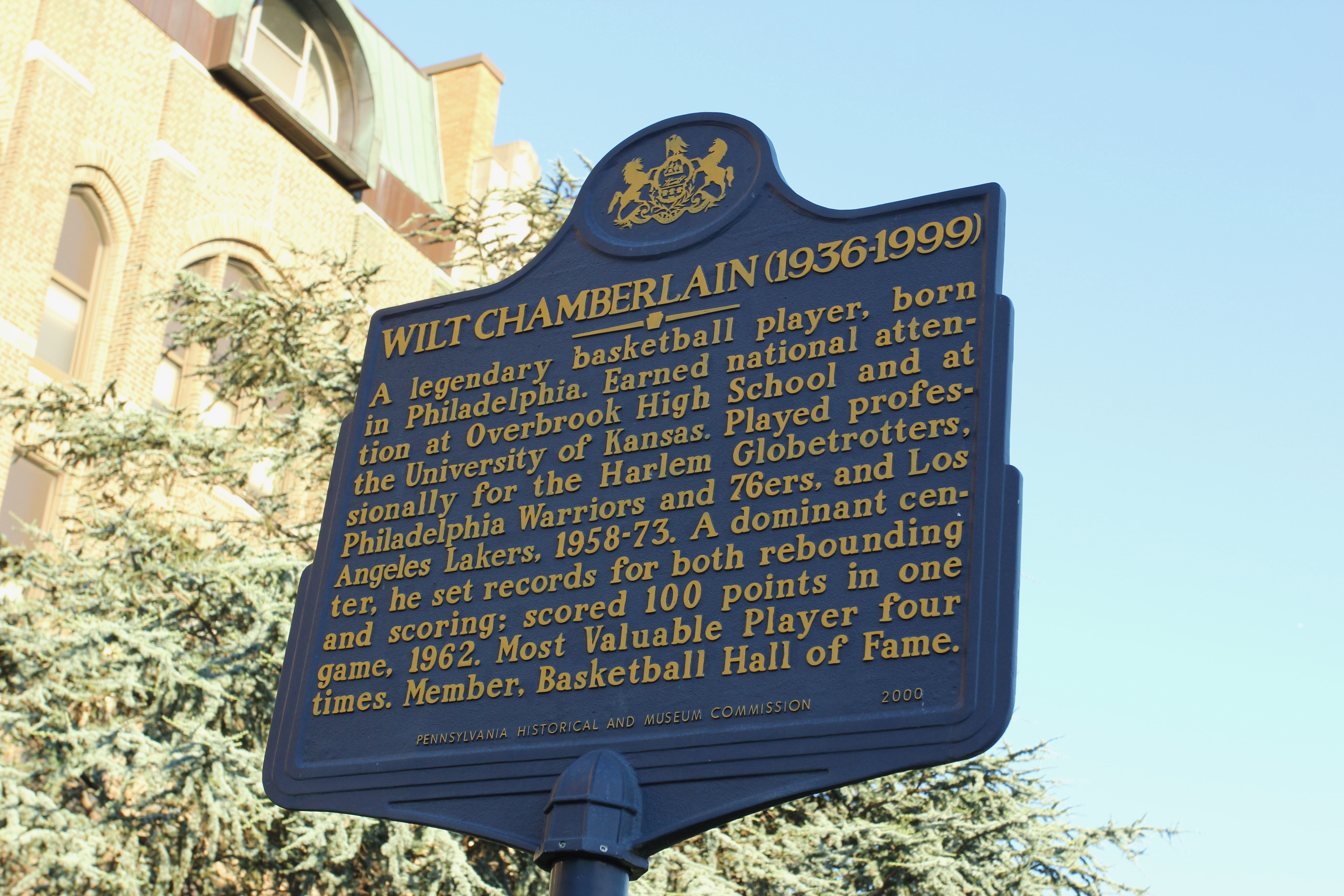
Wilt Chamberlain Historical Marker outside of the school
