= Free Library of Philadelphia =

Public library system in Philadelphia, Pennsylvania, US

Coordinates: 39.9595°N 75.1710°W

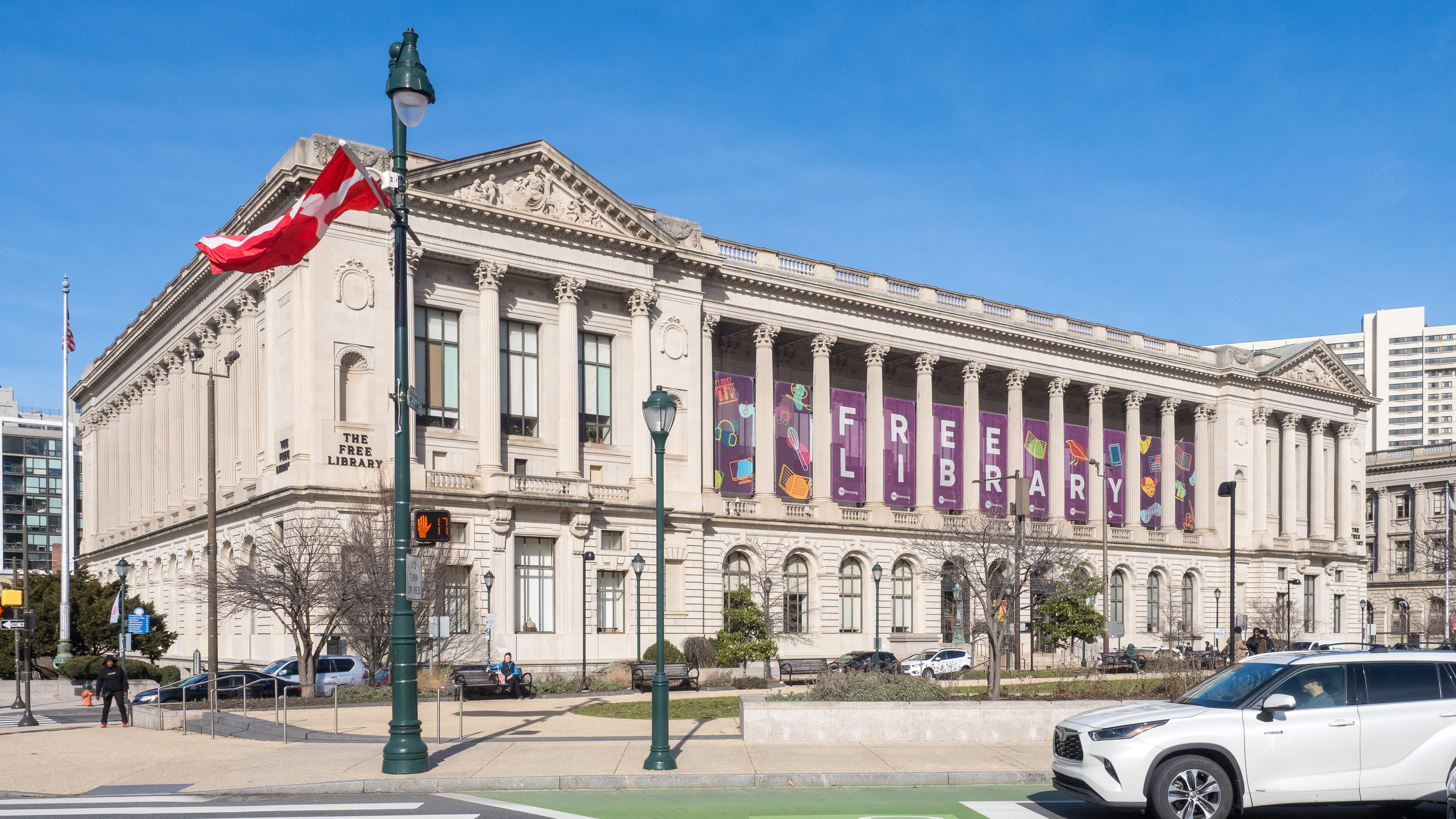
- Parkway Central Library in 2024
- Location: 1901 Vine Street, Philadelphia, Pennsylvania, U.S.
- Established: 1891
- Branches: 55

Collection
- Items collected: Chamber Music Collection; Children's Literature Research Collection; Drinker Choral Music Library; Early American Children's Books; Edwin A. Fleisher Collection of Orchestral Music; Map Collection; Print and Picture Collection; Rare Book Collections; Sheet Music Collection; Theatre Collection
- Size: 4,240,304

Access and use
- Population served: 1,560,297

Other information
- Director: Kelly Richards
- Website: http://www.freelibrary.org/

The Free Library of Philadelphia is the public library system that serves the city of Philadelphia, Pennsylvania. It is the 16th-largest public library system in the United States. The Free Library of Philadelphia is a non-Mayoral agency of the City of Philadelphia, governed by an independent Board of Trustees as per the Charter of the City of Philadelphia.

The Free Library of Philadelphia Foundation is a separate 501(c)(3) non-profit with its own board of directors and serves to support the mission of the Free Library of Philadelphia through philanthropic dollars.

== History ==
=== 19th century ===
The Free Library of Philadelphia was chartered in 1891 as "a general library which shall be free to all", through efforts led by Dr. William Pepper, who secured initial funding through a $225,000 bequest from his wealthy uncle, George S. Pepper. However, several libraries claimed the bequest, and only after the courts decided the money was intended to found a new public library did the Free Library finally open in March 1894. Its first location was three cramped rooms in City Hall. On February 11, 1895, the library was moved to the old Concert Hall at 1217-1221 Chestnut Street.

=== 20th century ===
Library officials criticized their new home as "an entirely unsuitable building, where its work is done in unsafe, unsanitary and overcrowded quarters, temporary make-shifts". On December 1, 1910, the Library was moved again, to the northeast corner of 13th and Locust Streets.

=== 21st century ===
In 2025, a study by A.H. Poole using archival research explored how between 1903 and 1916, concluding that the Free Library of Philadelphia’s story hours and its children’s work represented a crucible of community building.

== Operations ==
The Free Library of Philadelphia system, comprising 54 neighborhood library locations and the Rosenbach, advances literacy, guides learning, and inspires curiosity with millions of digital and physical materials; 28,000 yearly programs and events; free public computers and Wi-Fi; and rich special collections. With more than 6 million in-person visits and millions more online annually, the Free Library and the Rosenbach are among the most widely used educational and cultural institutions in Philadelphia and boast a worldwide impact.

=== Parkway Central Library ===
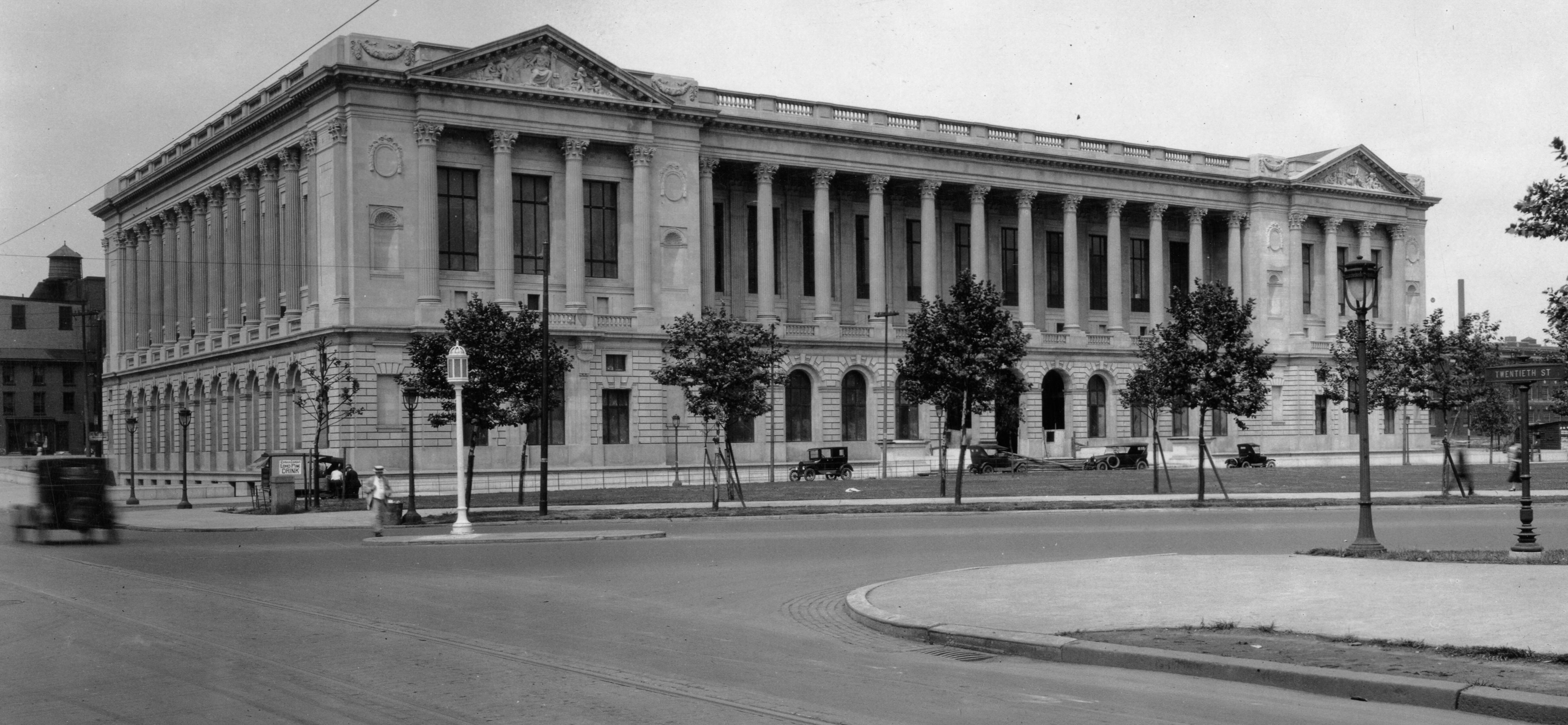
Street-level view of the front of the Parkway Central Library, July 1925.

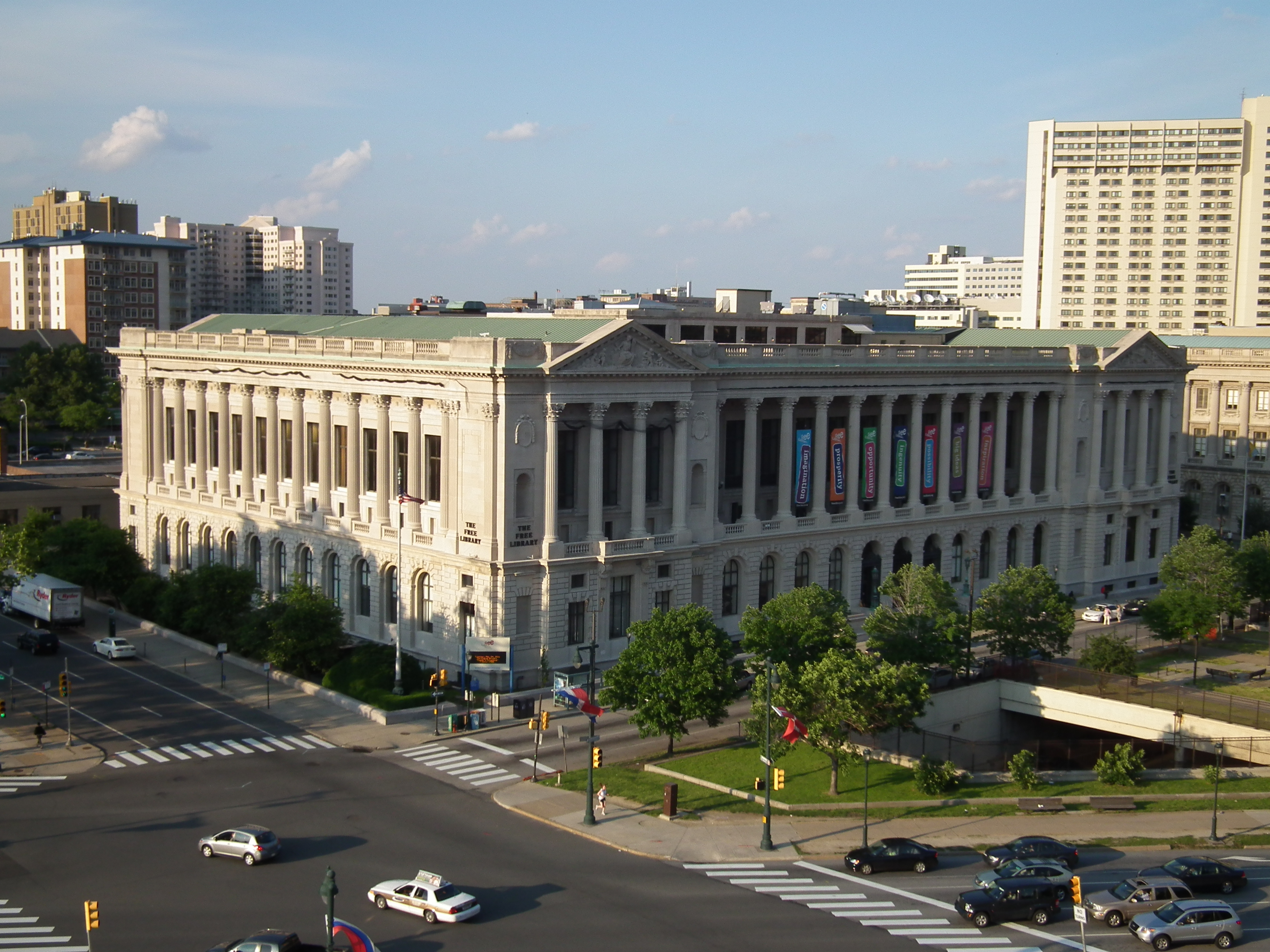
Parkway Central Library

On June 2, 1927, the Parkway Central Library opened for service at its present location at 1901 Vine Street on Logan Square. The building had been in planning since 1911; various obstacles, including World War I, held up progress. The grand Beaux-Arts building was designed by Julian Abele, chief designer in the office of prominent Philadelphia architect Horace Trumbauer, and first opened its doors in 1927. Its design, that of the adjacent Philadelphia Family Court building, and their placement on Logan Circle closely follow that of the Hôtel de Crillon and the Hôtel de la Marine on Paris's Place de la Concorde.

=== Mission ===
The mission of the Free Library of Philadelphia is "to advance literacy, guide learning, and inspire curiosity."

== Services ==
=== Programs ===
The Free Library of Philadelphia hosts more than 25,000 events each year, including job-search workshops, small business programming, English as a Second Language conversation groups, and computer classes. Many of these programs and services are funded in whole or in part by The Free Library of Philadelphia Foundation, a not-for-profit which exists to supplement the funds available through the City of Philadelphia for activities at the Free Library of Philadelphia. The Free Library's Culinary Literacy Center, which opened in the spring of 2014 at the Parkway Central Library, offers culinary classes for children, teens, families, and adults to teach literacy skills through cooking as well as math, chemistry, nutrition, and health. The Library hosts a renowned Author Events Series produced through its Foundation, which brings more than 100 writers, politicians, scientists, researchers, and musicians to the Free Library annually. The Library Foundation also supports the Library in hosting the citywide One Book, One Philadelphia program, which encourages all Philadelphians to read and discuss the same book, fostering community and connection; the Summer Reading program, which engages some 50,000 Philadelphia school children each summer; and the Literacy Enrichment After-school Program (LEAP). In addition, the Free Library hosts months-long celebrations of literary milestones, from the birthdays of influential writers like Charles Dickens and William Shakespeare to the publication anniversaries of groundbreaking titles like Pride and Prejudice and Alice’s Adventures in Wonderland.

The Free Library Foundation also manages READ by 4th, a citywide effort of public and private organizations aiming to significantly increase the number of students in Philadelphia entering the 4th grade at reading level by 2020. READ by 4th's comprehensive strategy includes improving early learning, providing parents with resources to teach their children reading skills, emphasizing summer reading and other strategies to prevent learning loss, decreasing absenteeism by addressing behavioral and health concerns, and enhancing reading instruction in schools.

The Free Library also manages the Philadelphia Reading Olympics, Philadelphia's largest annual reading competition. The Reading Olympics engages up to 2,000 students between 4th-8th grade from Philadelphia's public schools, as well as private schools and after-school programs.

=== Digital services ===
The Free Library's digital offerings include nearly 300,000 streaming or downloadable ebooks; 1,000 public computers; 1,700-plus author event podcasts; 150 online databases; daily homework and computer literacy classes online; Hot Spot community computer training centers; and the roving Techmobile.

==== Hot Spots initiative ====
In March 2011, the library launched Free Library Hot Spots, placing new computer labs and computer trainers in existing community centers in low-income areas of the city. The initiative was funded by the John S. and James L. Knight Foundation and the Broadband Technology Opportunities Program. Each Hot Spot provides computers, internet access, printers, and a small selection of Free Library materials. (These are in addition to the 650 public-access computers and free WiFi throughout the Free Library's 54 branches.)

In April 2012, the Free Library added The Techmobile, a Hot Spot on Wheels, which brings service to neighborhoods throughout Philadelphia. The Techmobile has six public laptops.

=== Impact ===
According to a study conducted by Penn's Fels Institute of Government, in 2017 nearly 25,000 people learned to read or taught someone else to read solely because of the resources of the Free Library. In addition, nearly 1,000 people found jobs based on the career resources of the Free Library, and some 8,600 entrepreneurs were able to start, grow or improve their small businesses because of programs and resources available free of charge at the Library.

== Special collections ==
Located at the Parkway Central Library, the Free Library's Special Collections span genres and generations, from ancient cuneiform tablets to historic photographs of Philadelphia.

The Free Library of Philadelphia's Children's Literature Research Collection houses an extensive research collection of children's literature published after 1836.

The Rare Book Department features one of the world's most renowned Charles Dickens collections, with first editions, personal letters, and Dickens’ stuffed pet raven, Grip, as well as extensive collections of illuminated manuscripts, Americana, Beatrix Potter, early children's books, Edgar Allan Poe, Pennsylvania German folk art, and more. The collection includes over 50 Books of Hours and numerous bibles, liturgical texts, and psalters, including the Lewis Psalter (Lewis E M 185), a masterpiece of Parisian illumination from the reign of Saint Louis.

The Free Library's music collections include the Edwin A. Fleisher Collection of Orchestral Music, the largest lending library of orchestral performance sets in the world.

Additionally, the Rosenbach Museum & Library is a subsidiary of the Free Library of Philadelphia Foundation.

== Neighborhood libraries ==
In addition to the Parkway Central Library and the Rosenbach in downtown Philadelphia, the system operates 54 neighborhood and regional library locations throughout the city. Many of these locations were funded by Andrew Carnegie, who donated US$1.5 million to the library in 1903. The Parkway Central Library and twenty extant Carnegie-funded branch libraries were documented by the Historic American Buildings Survey in 2007, as noted in the HABS column of the table below.

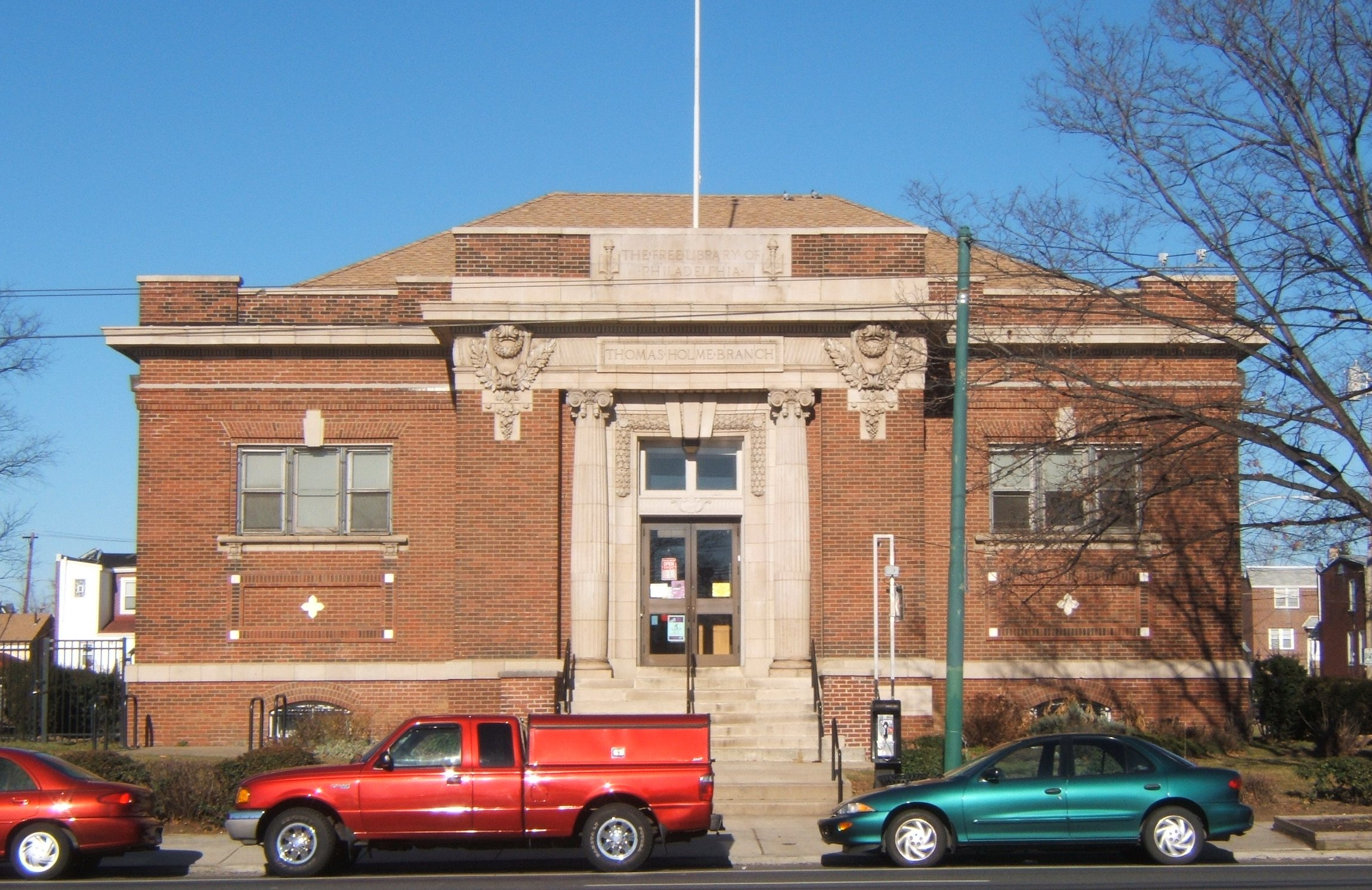
Holmesburg Library

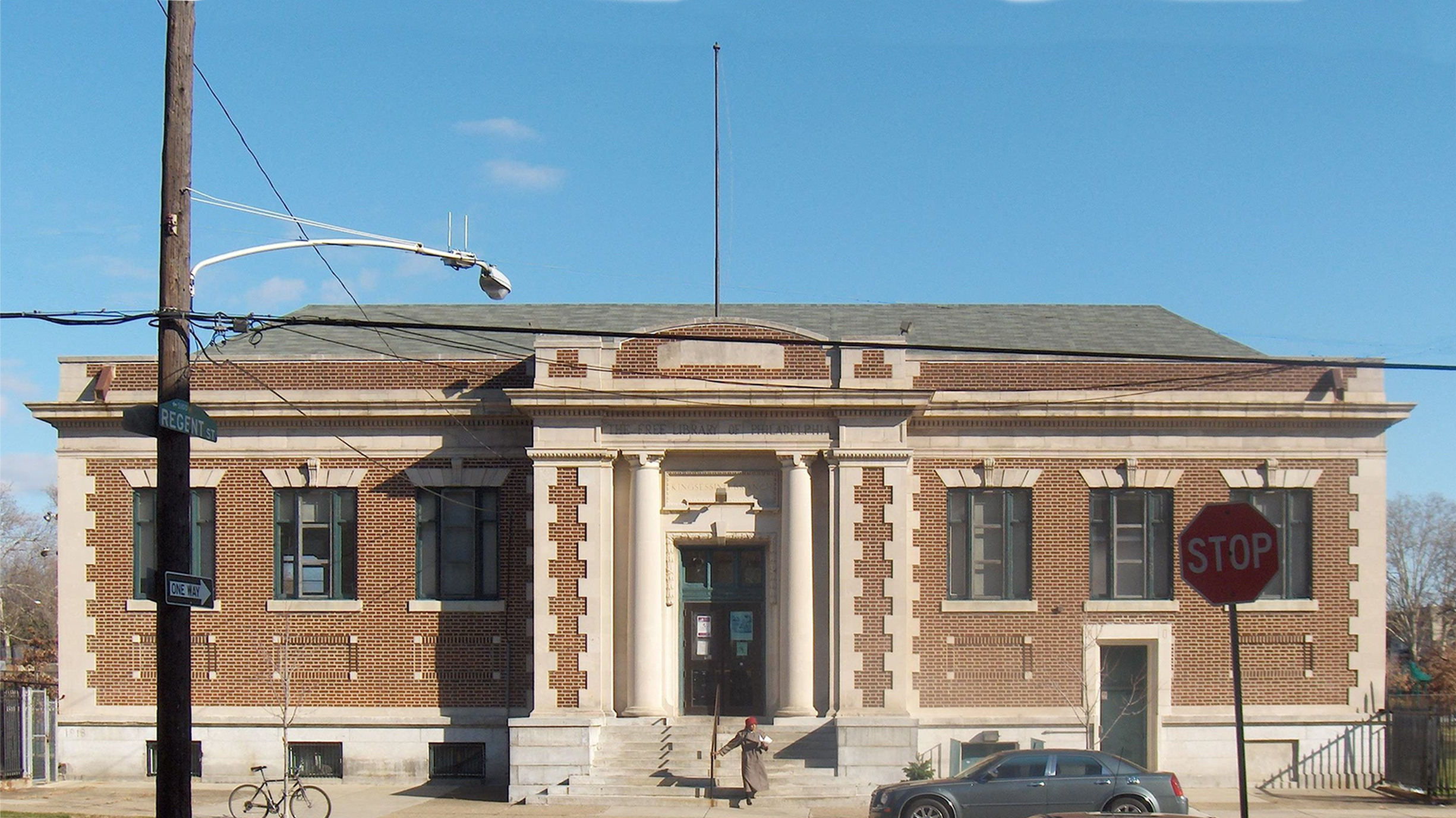
Kingsessing Library

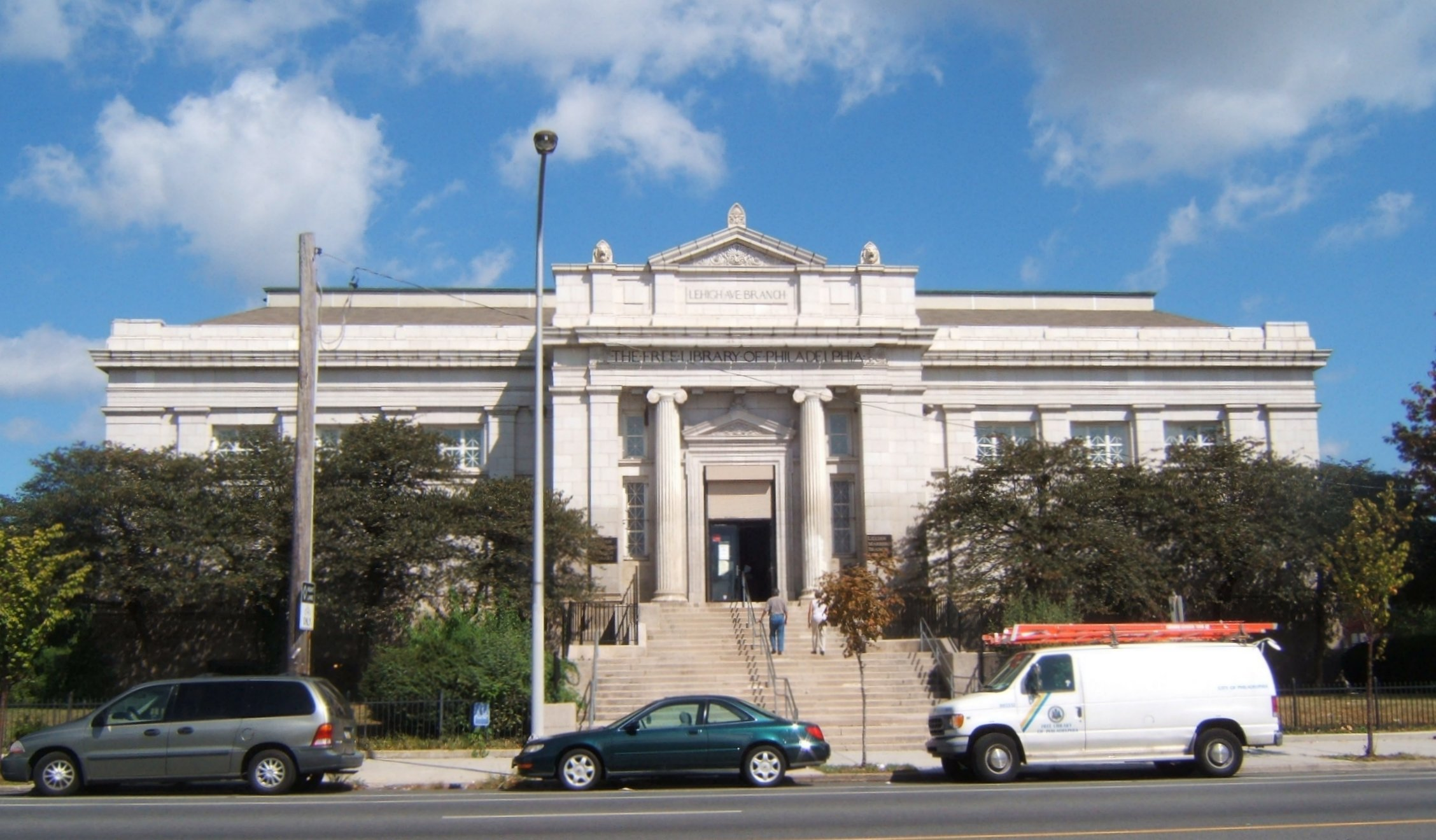
Lillian Marrero Library

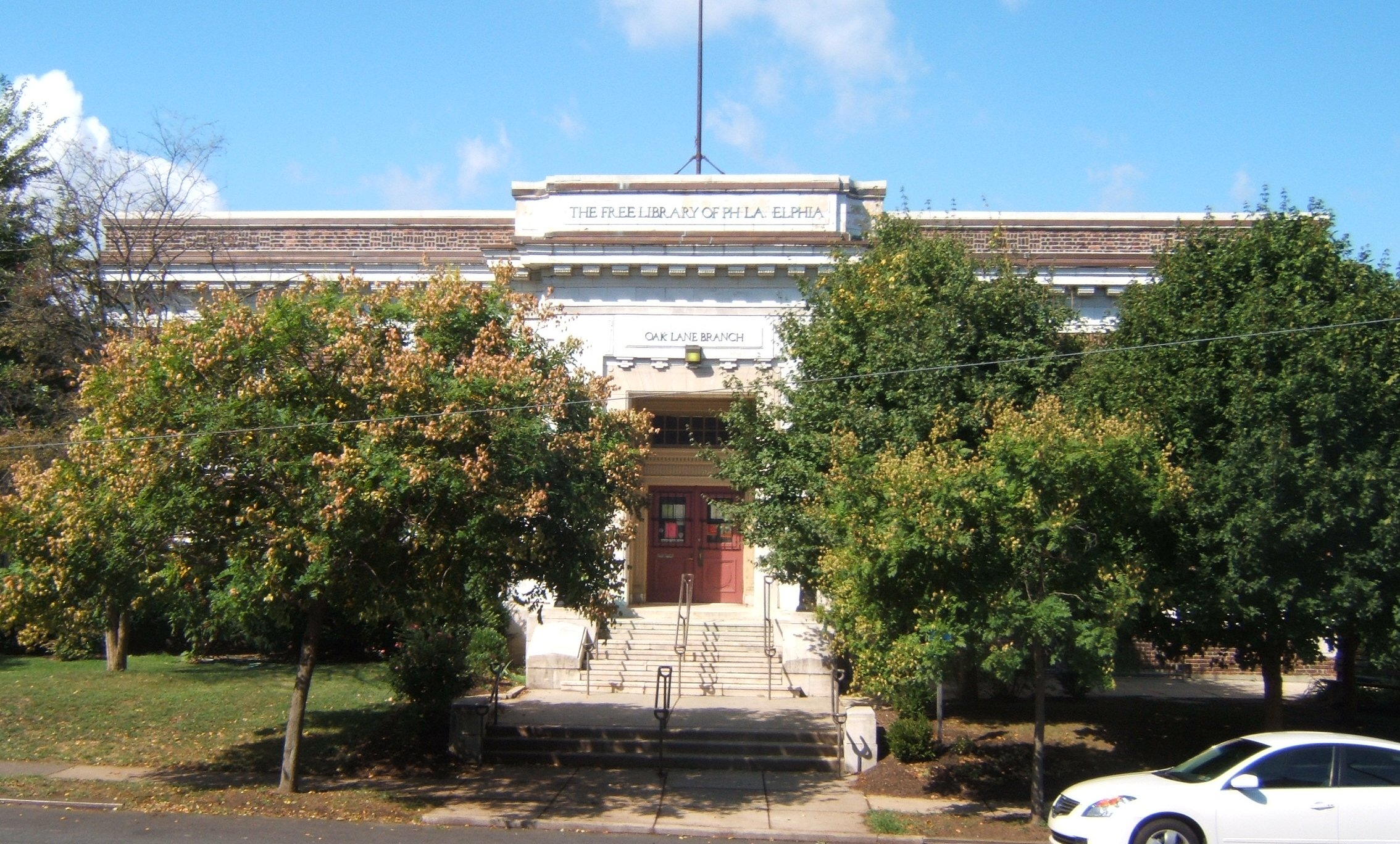
Oak Lane Library

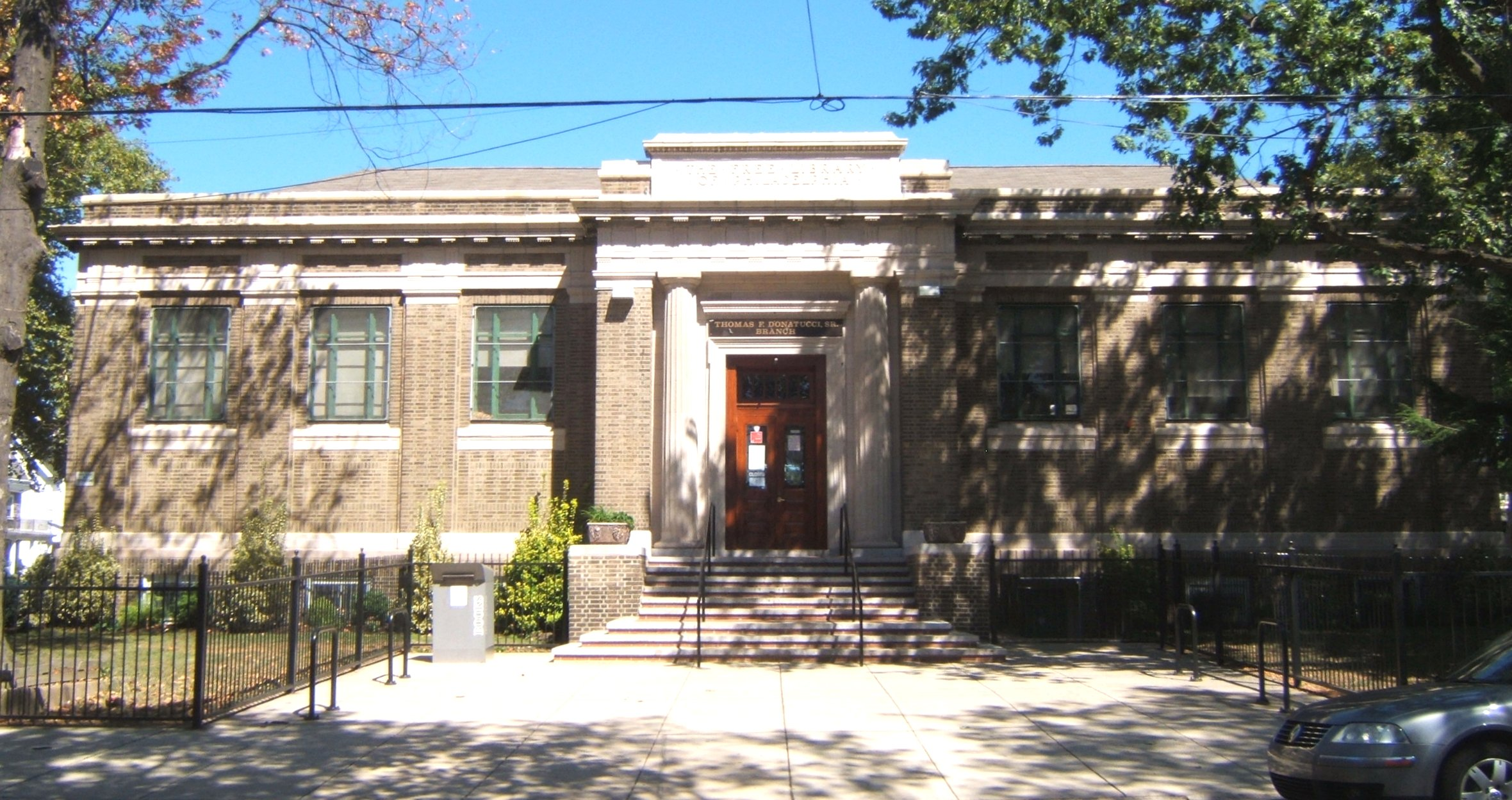
Thomas F. Donatucci Sr. Library

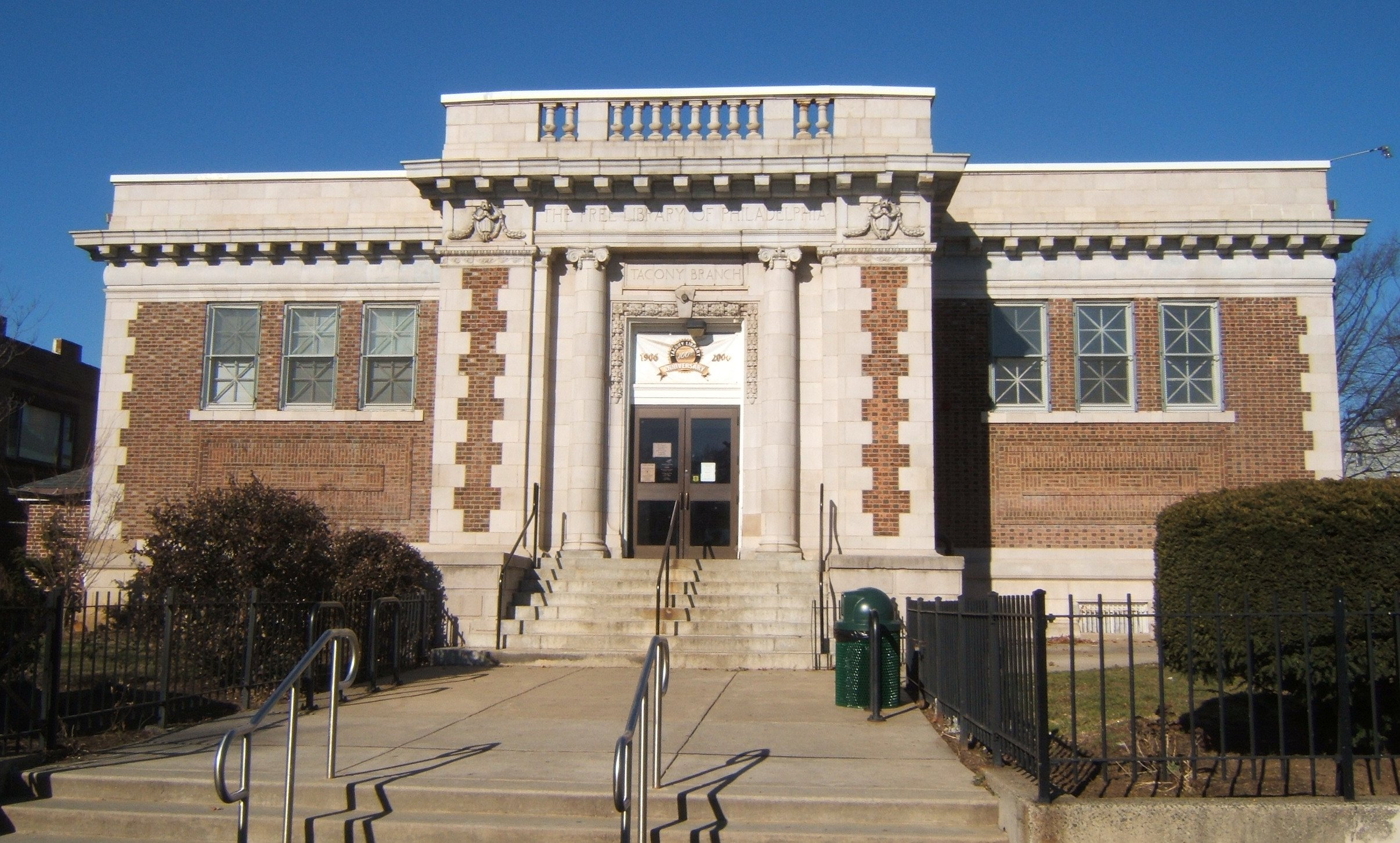
Tacony Library

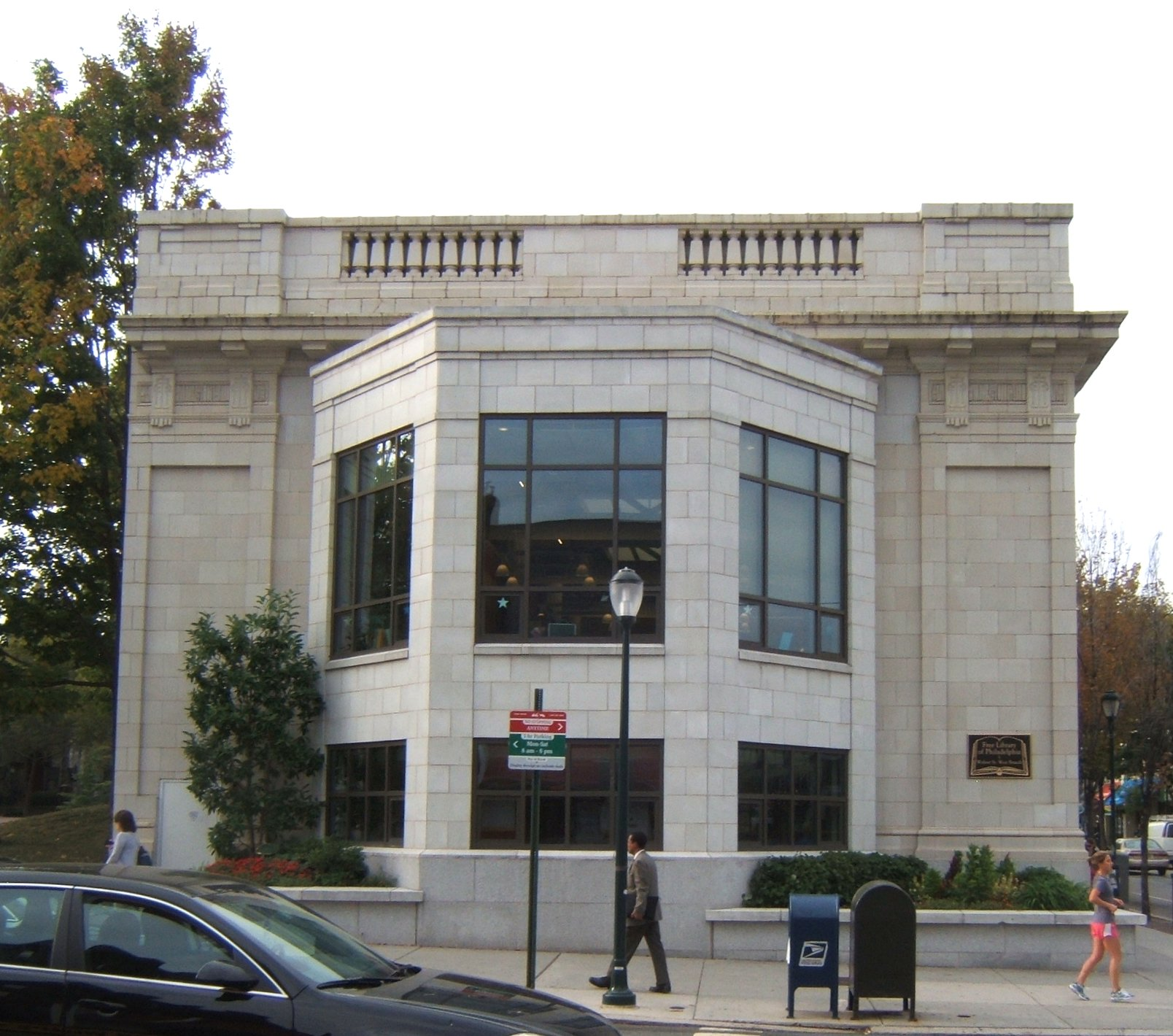
Walnut Street West Library

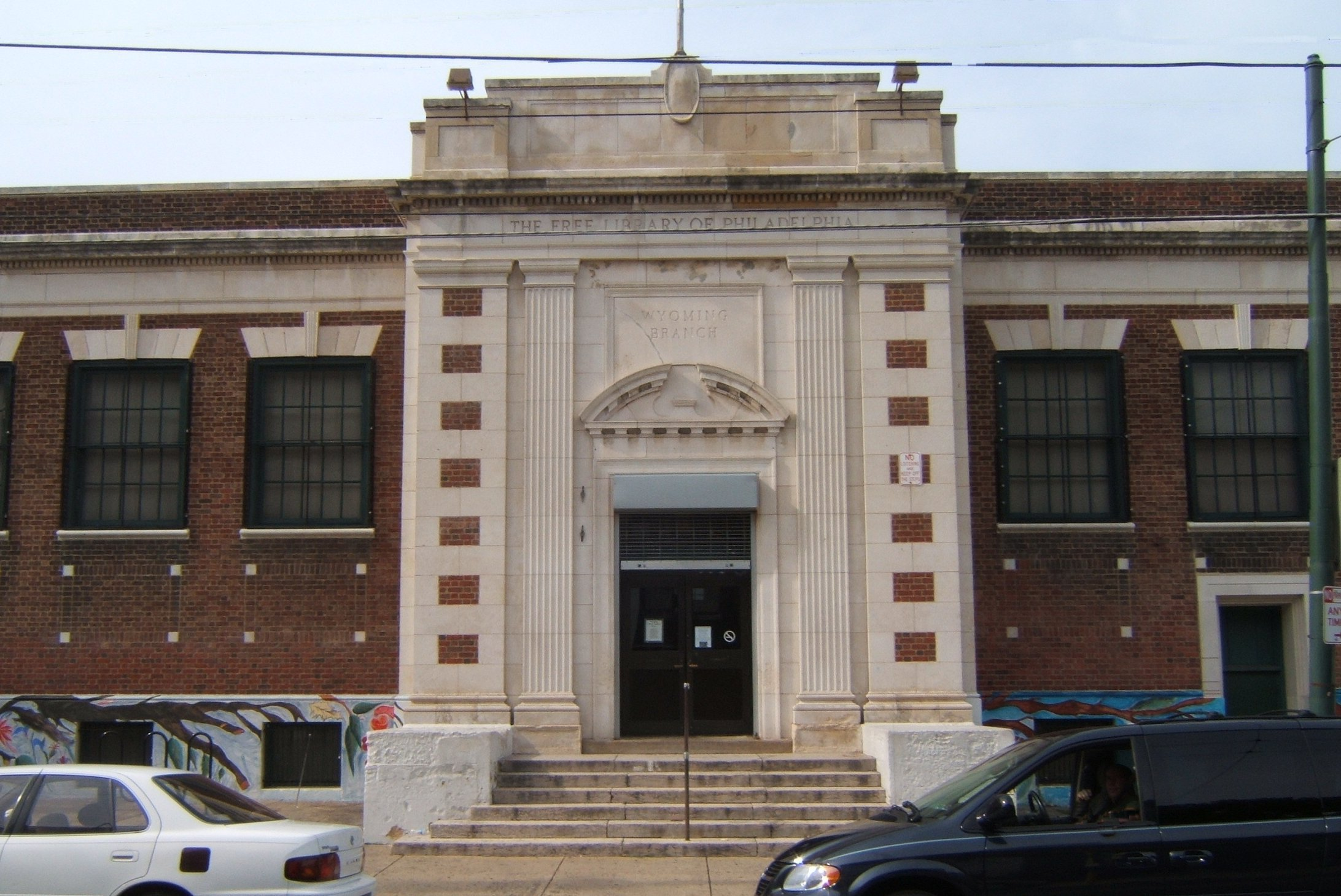
Wyoming Library

#	Name	Address	Neighborhood(s) Served	HABS No.
[01]	Andorra	705 East Cathedral Road	Andorra and Upper Roxborough	
[02]	Blanche A. Nixon	5800 Cobbs Creek Parkway	Cobbs Creek	PA-6751
[03]	Bushrod	6304 Castor Avenue	Oxford Circle, Castor Gardens, Upper Northwood, Summerdale, and the Lower Northeast	
[04]	Bustleton	10199 Bustleton Avenue	Bustleton and Somerton	
[05]	Cecil B. Moore	2320 Cecil B. Moore Avenue	North Central, Strawberry Mansion, Brewerytown, Sharswood, and the Johnson Homes	
[06]	Charles L. Durham	3320 Haverford Avenue	Mantua and Powelton	
[07]	Charles Santore	932 South 7th Street	Bella Vista, Queen Village, and Hawthorne	
[08]	Chestnut Hill	8711 Germantown Avenue	Chestnut Hill	PA-6750
[09]	David Cohen Ogontz	6017 Ogontz Avenue	Ogontz and Belfield	
[10]	Eastwick	2851 Island Avenue	Eastwick, Elmwood, Clearview, and Penrose Park	
[11]	Falls of Schuylkill	3501 Midvale Avenue	East Falls	PA-6764
[12]	Fishtown Community	1217 East Montgomery Avenue	Fishtown and New Kensington	
[13]	Fox Chase	501 Rhawn Street	Fox Chase and Burholme	
[14]	Frankford	4634 Frankford Avenue	Frankford, Northwood, Bridesburg, and part of Juniata Park	
[15]	Fumo Family	2437 South Broad Street	Melrose	
[16]	Greater Olney	5501 North 5th Street	Olney	
[17]	Haddington	446 North 65th Street	Haddington-Carroll Park and Overbrook-Morris Park	PA-6753
[18]	Haverford	5543 Haverford Avenue	Haddington-Carroll Park	
[19]	Holmesburg	7810 Frankford Avenue	Holmesburg and Mayfair	PA-6754
[20]	Independence	18 South 7th Street	Society Hill, Old City, Queen Village, Washington Square West, and Chinatown	
[21]	Joseph E. Coleman Northwest Regional Library	68 West Chelten Avenue	Germantown	
[22]	Katharine Drexel	11099 Knights Road	Normandy, North and West Torresdale, Morrell Park, Millbrook, Parkwood, Crestmont Farms, Brookhaven, and Walton Park	
[23]	Kensington	104 West Dauphin Street	Kensington, West Kensington, and Norris Square	
[24]	Kingsessing	1201 South 51st Street	Kingsessing	PA-6755
[25]	Lawncrest	6098 Rising Sun Avenue	Lawndale, Crescentville, Lawncrest, and Cedar Grove	
[26]	Library of Accessible Media for Pennsylvanians (LAMP)	919 Walnut Street	The Library of Accessible Media for Pennsylvanians serves the whole state of Pennsylvania	
[27]	Lillian Marrero	601 West Lehigh Avenue	Central North, Fairhill, St. Edwards, Hartranft, and West Kensington	PA-6756
[28]	Logan	1333 Wagner Avenue	Logan	PA-6757
[29]	Lovett	6945 Germantown Avenue	East and West Mt. Airy	
[30]	Lucien E. Blackwell West Philadelphia Regional Library	125 South 52nd Street	Cedar Park, Walnut Hill, West Market, Mill Creek, Dunlap, and West Park	
[31]	McPherson Square	601 East Indiana Avenue	Kensington, McPherson Square, and K & A	PA-6759
[32]	Nicetown-Tioga	3720 North Broad Street	Nicetown and Tioga	
[33]	Northeast Regional Library	2228 Cottman Avenue	Greater Northeast	
[34]	Oak Lane	6614 North 12th Street	Oak Lane	PA-6760
[35]	Overbrook Park	7422 Haverford Avenue	Overbrook Park	
[36]	Parkway Central	1901 Vine Street	--	PA-6749
[37]	Paschalville	6942 Woodland Avenue	Paschalville and Elmwood	PA-6761
[38]	Philadelphia City Institute	1905 Locust Street	Rittenhouse Square and Fitler Square	
[39]	Queen Memorial Library	1201 South 23rd Street	Point Breeze, Graduate Hospital, and Grays Ferry	
[40]	Ramonita de Rodriguez	600 West Girard Avenue	Olde Kensington, Kensington South, Ludlow, Yorktown, East and West Poplar, Northern Liberties, Girard, and Poplar	
[41]	Richmond	2987 Almond Street	Richmond and Port Richmond	PA-6763
[42]	The Rosenbach	2008-2010 Delancey Place	--	
[43]	Roxborough	6245 Ridge Avenue	Roxborough, Manayunk and Wissahickon	
[44]	South Philadelphia	1700 South Broad Street	South Philadelphia	PA-6767
[45]	Tacony	6742 Torresdale Avenue	Tacony and Wissinoming	PA-6692-H
[46]	Thomas F. Donatucci Sr.	1935 Shunk Street	Girard Estate, Packer Park, Passyunk Homes, St. Richards, and West Passyunk	PA-6762
[47]	Torresdale	3079 Holme Avenue	Academy Gardens, Ashton-Woodbridge, Pennypack, Pennypack Woods, Upper Holmesburg, and Winchester Park	
[48]	Wadsworth	1500 Wadsworth Avenue	Wadsworth, Cedarbrook, Ivy Hill, and East Mt. Airy	
[49]	Walnut Street West	201 South 40th Street	University City and Spruce Hill	PA-6765
[50]	Welsh Road	9233 Roosevelt Boulevard	Aston Wooden Bridge and Bustleton	
[51]	West Oak Lane	2000 Washington Lane	West Oak Lane and parts of Cedarbrook, Ivy Hill, and East Mt. Airy	
[52]	Whitman	200 Snyder Avenue	Whitman and Pennsport	
[53]	Widener	2808 West Lehigh Avenue	North Central, Strawberry Mansion, and Allegheny West	
[54]	Wynnefield	5325 Overbrook Avenue	Wynnefield and Overbrook Farms	
[55]	Wyoming	231 East Wyoming Avenue	Feltonville and Juniata Park	PA-6766

== See also ==
- List of Carnegie libraries in Philadelphia
- Philadelphia Reading Olympics
