= List of people from Philadelphia =

The following is a list of notable people presently or previously associated with the city of Philadelphia, Pennsylvania:

== Academia ==
- Joseph Addison Alexander (1809–1860), clergyman and biblical scholar
- Daniel Amey (1941–2026), application engineer
- E. Digby Baltzell (1915–1996), sociologist, author, and professor at the University of Pennsylvania
- Ellen Bass (born 1947), professor, poet, and author
- Leon Bass (1925–2015), educator and Benjamin Franklin High School principal
- Aaron Beck (1921–2021), psychiatrist, inventor of cognitive therapy, and Penn School of Medicine professor
- Algernon Sydney Biddle (1847–1891), lawyer and Penn Law School professor
- Ray Birdwhistell (1918–1994), anthropologist, University of Pennsylvania professor, and inventor of kinesics
- Atherton Blight (1834–1909), lawyer, businessperson, author, diarist, philanthropist, and Art Club of Philadelphia founding member
- Alfred Bloom, linguist, professor, and Swarthmore College president
- Francis Bohlen (1868–1942), Penn Law School professor
- Derek Bok (born 1930), lawyer, Harvard Law School dean, and former Harvard University president
- Lisa Bowleg, George Washington University social psychology professor
- Ruby Chappelle Boyd (1919–2024), librarian
- David D. Burns (born 1942), psychiatrist, author, Penn School of Medicine psychiatry professor
- Noam Chomsky (born 1928), linguist, Far-left political activist, anarchist, and professor
- Gordon Clark (1902–1985), Christian theologian and professor
- Leda Cosmides (born 1957), psychologist, helped develop evolutionary psychology field
- Philip D. Curtin (1922–2009), Africa historian on Atlantic slave trade
- Steven Drizin, lawyer and professor
- Drew Gilpin Faust (born 1947), historian, University of Pennsylvania administrator, and Harvard University president
- R. Buckminster Fuller (1895–1983), architect, systems theorist, author, University of Pennsylvania design professor
- Andrew Gelman (born 1965), Columbia University professor, statistics and political science
- Gaylord P. Harnwell (1903–1982), University of Pennsylvania professor and president
- Earl G. Harrison (1899–1955), Penn Law School dean and former INS commissioner
- Marc Lamont Hill (born 1978), professor, journalist, activist, and BET News correspondent
- Agnes Irwin (1841–1914), Agnes Irwin School founder and first dean of Radcliffe College
- Martin M. Kaplan (1915–2004), virologist and public health official
- Seymour S. Kety (1915–2000), neuroscientist and schizophrenia researcher
- Lawrence Klein (1920–2013), economist, Nobel laureate, University of Pennsylvania economics professor
- C. Everett Koop (1916–2013), U.S. Surgeon General
- Byard Lancaster (1942–2012), avant-garde jazz saxophonist and flutist
- Alain LeRoy Locke (1885–1954), writer, philosopher, educator, and first African-American Rhodes Scholar
- Kenneth Margerison (1946–2025), historian
- Margaret Mead (1901–1978), cultural anthropologist and author
- Virginia Ramey Mollenkott (1932–2020), feminist theologian and writer
- William Augustus Muhlenberg (1796–1877), considered "father of parochial schools"
- John Pittenger (1930–2009), lawyer, academic, and former Pennsylvania House of Representatives member
- Philip Rieff (1922–2006), sociologist, cultural critic, and University of Pennsylvania professor
- Vera Rubin (1928–2016), astronomer, cosmologist, professor at Georgetown University, and research fellow at the Carnegie Institution for Science
- Louis B. Schwartz (1913–2003), University of Pennsylvania Law School law professor
- Dora Adele Shoemaker (1873–1962), educator, writer
- Jacob Soll (born 1968), historian and MacArthur Fellow
- Lawrence H. Summers (born 1954), economist, U.S. Secretary of the Treasury and Harvard University president
- Elaine Svenonius (born 1933), librarian and library scholar
- George Thayer (1933–1973), American political writer
- Howard M. Temin (1934–1994), Nobel Prize co-laureate in physiology or medicine
- Cornelius Van Til (1895–1987), Christian theologian, professor, originator of modern presuppositional apologetics
- Lawrence Venuti (born 1953), translation theorist and translation historian
- Andrew Weil (born 1942), celebrity doctor and alternative medicine advocate
- Gayraud Wilmore (1921–2020), writer, historian, ethicist, educator, and theologian
- Walter E. Williams (1936–2020), economist, commentator, and academic
- Harris Wofford (1926–2019), Peace Corps director, Bryn Mawr College president, U.S. senator appointee
- Bernard Wolfman (1924–2011), University of Pennsylvania Law School law professor and dean
- Josh Wurman (born 1960), meteorologist on Storm Chasers

== Art and architecture ==
- Julian Abele (1881–1950), architect who contributed to the design of over 400 buildings
- Robb Armstrong (born 1962), African-American cartoonist, creator of Jump Start
- Edmund Bacon (1910–2005), urban planner, architect, educator, and author
- Bill Bamberger (born 1956), documentary photographer and photojournalist
- Albert C. Barnes (1872–1951), creator of the Barnes Collection of Art and Argyrol inventor
- Mary Enoch Elizabeth Baxter (born 1981), multimedia artist and activist
- Cecilia Beaux (1855–1942), portrait painter
- William Bell (1830–1910), photographer
- Alexander Calder (1898–1976), sculptor
- Alexander Milne Calder (1846–1923), sculptor
- Alexander Stirling Calder (1870–1945), sculptor
- John Carlin (1813–1891), painter
- Mary Cassatt (1844–1926), impressionist painter and printmaker
- Florence Van Leer Earle Coates (1850–1927), poet
- Robert Crumb (born 1943), underground comics artist, writer
- Heather Dewey-Hagborg (born 1982), information artist and bio-hacker
- Marley Dias, activist and writer
- Thomas Eakins (1844–1916), realist painter, photographer, sculptor, Pennsylvania Academy of Fine Arts professor
- Frank Heyling Furness (1839–1912), architect who designed over 600 buildings
- Sonia Gechtoff (1926–2018), abstract expressionist painter
- William W. Gilchrist Jr., impressionist painter
- Ginger Gilmour (born 1949), sculptor and first wife of Pink Floyd guitarist David Gilmour
- Phoebe Gloeckner (born 1960), cartoonist, illustrator, painter, novelist
- Elizabeth Shippen Green (1871–1954), children's books illustrator
- Hal Hirshorn (1965–2025), painter and photographer
- Donelson Hoopes (1932–2006), art historian
- Ian Hornak (1944–2002), draughtsman, painter, and printmaker
- Amy Ignatow (born 1977), illustrator, cartoonist, and author
- Louis Kahn (1901–1974), architect
- Bil Keane (1922–2011), cartoonist, The Family Circus
- Walt Kelly (1913–1973), cartoonist, Pogo
- H. Mather Lippincott Jr. (1921–2010), architect
- Henry P. McIlhenny (1910–1986), art and antique connoisseur, philanthropist, curator, and Philadelphia Museum of Art chairman
- John Moran (1831–1902), photographer and artist
- Alice Neel (1900–1984), painter
- Albert Newsam (1809–1864), born deaf and former artist
- Linda Nochlin (1931–2017), feminist art historian and Bryn Mawr College professor
- Martin Nodell (1915–2006), comic book artist and creator of the original Green Lantern
- Charles Willson Peale (1741–1827), artist and progenitor of the Peale family of American artists
- Edmund R. Purves (1897–1964), architect
- William H. Rau (1855–1920), photographer]
- Seymour Remenick (1923–1999), artist
- Elizabeth Wentworth Roberts (1871–1927), painter and founder of Concord Art Association
- Judith Schermer (born 1941), artist and writer
- Carolee Schneemann (1939–2019), visual experimental artist on sexuality and gender
- Mary B. Schuenemann (1898–1992), painter
- Denise Scott Brown (born 1931), architect, planner, writer, and educator
- Sarai Sherman (1922–2013), painter and sculptor
- Grover Simcox (1867–1966), illustrator, naturalist, and polymath
- Jessie Wilcox Smith (1863–1935), illustrator
- Willi Smith (1948–1987), fashion designer
- Zoe Strauss (born 1970), photographer
- William Strickland (1788–1854), architect and civil engineer
- Thomas Sully (1783–1872), portrait painter of national political leaders
- Henry Ossawa Tanner (1859–1937), one of the first African-American painters
- Daniel Traub (born 1971), photographer and filmmaker
- Horace Trumbauer (1868–1938), architect
- Robert Venturi (1925–2018), architect
- Thomas Ustick Walter (1804–1887), architect and American Institute of Architects co-founder and president
- Andrew Wyeth (1917–2009), visual artist
- Jamie Wyeth (born 1946), painter
- N.C. Wyeth (1882–1945), artist and illustrator
- Lily Yeh (born 1941), artist

== Business ==
- Frank Baldino Jr. (1953–2010), pharmacologist, scientist, and Cephalon co-founder
- John C. Bogle (1929–2019), investor, money manager, and Vanguard founder
- Amar Bose (1929–2013), founder and chairman, Bose
- David L. Cohen (born 1955), senior executive vice president and chief lobbyist for Comcast, chief of staff to Philadelphia mayor, U.S. ambassador to Canada nominee
- Pat Croce (born 1954), entrepreneur, Philadelphia 76ers executive and part-owner, author, and television personality
- George Dashnau (1923–2001), advertising executive who started first mail order delivery service to supply human skulls
- Charles Henry Davis (1865–1951), businessperson, civil engineer, philanthropist; founded World Peace Movement
- Warren Lyford DeLano (1972–2009), advocate for increased open sourcing and PyMol creator
- George H. Earle Jr. (1856–1928), attorney
- Maria Anna Fisher (1819–1911), African-American baker, entrepreneur, and philanthropist
- Kenneth Frazier (born 1954), Merck & Co. chief executive officer
- A. O. Granger (Arthur Otis Granger; 1846–1914), industrialist and soldier
- Albert M. Greenfield (1887–1967), local realty magnate, philanthropist, and political activist
- Solomon R. Guggenheim (1861–1949), Yukon Gold Company founder and philanthropist who established Solomon R. Guggenheim Foundation and Solomon R. Guggenheim Museum
- Richard Hayne (born 1947), Urban Outfitters founder and chief executive officer
- Michael Johns (born 1964), healthcare executive and former White House presidential speechwriter
- Eldridge R. Johnson (1867–1945), Victor Talking Machine Company founder
- Tom Knox, UnitedHealthcare of Pennsylvania chief executive officer and former Philadelphia mayoral candidate
- John Leamy (1757–1839), Spanish Empire trade pioneer
- J. Howard Marshall (1905–1995), oil businessman, Koch, Inc. stakeholder, husband of Anna Nicole Smith
- George Meade (1741–1808), merchant
- Richard W. Meade (1778–1828), merchant and art collector
- Samuel Meeker (1763–1831), merchant
- Jim Murray, Ronald McDonald House Charities co-founder and former Philadelphia Eagles general manager
- Joel Myers (born 1939), AccuWeather founder and executive chairman
- Pat Olivieri (1910–1970), founder of Pat's King of Steaks and reputed creator of the cheesesteak
- William S. Paley (1901–1990), CBS chief executive
- Randal Pinkett (born 1971), entrepreneur and The Apprentice 4 winner
- Felix Rappaport (1952–2018), Foxwoods Resort and Casino chief executive officer
- Lynda Resnick (born 1943), co-owner of Roll International, which owns POM Wonderful, FIJI Water, and Teleflora
- Brian L. Roberts (born 1959), Comcast Corporation chairman and chief executive officer
- Michael G. Rubin (born 1972), Kynetic founder and chief executive officer, Philadelphia 76ers part owner, and GSI Commerce founder and former chief executive officer
- Stephen A. Schwarzman (born 1947), The Blackstone Group founder and chief executive officer
- Ed Snider (1933–2016), Comcast Spectacor chairman
- Justus Strawbridge (1838–1911), department store founder
- John B. Thayer (1862–1912), businessman and executive of the Pennsylvania Railroad Company; died in the sinking of the Titanic
- Brian Tierney (born 1957), The Philadelphia Inquirer publisher
- John Wanamaker (1838–1922), department store founder
- Walter E. Williams (1936–2020), economist, commentator, and academic
- Vincent Wolanin, businessman and former professional racquetball player
- James Hood Wright (1836–1894), banker, financier, and corporate director, associate of J. P. Morgan and Thomas Edison
- William Wrigley Jr. (1861–1932), Wm. Wrigley Jr. Company founder

== Criminals ==
- Sydney Biddle Barrows (born 1952), escort service proprietor known as "The Mayflower Madam"
- Grover Bergdoll (1893–1966), draft dodger and escaped convict; brother of Erwin Bergdoll
- Antuan Bronshtein, convicted murderer, reputed Russian Mafia associate
- Angelo Bruno (1910–1980), Philadelphia crime family boss
- Juan Covington (born 1962), serial killer
- Legs Diamond (1897–1931), nemesis of mobster Dutch Schultz known as the "clay pigeon of the underworld"
- Ira Einhorn (1940–2020), environmental and anti-war activist, convicted murderer, and speaker at first Earth Day event in Philadelphia
- Mary Jane Fonder (1942–2018), convicted murderer of Rhonda Smith
- Keith Gibson (born 1982), convicted serial killer
- Kermit Gosnell (born 1941), convicted of 21 felony counts of illegal late-term abortion
- Harrison Graham, serial killer
- Gary Heidnik (1943–1999), convicted murderer
- Philip Leonetti (born 1953), underboss of Philadelphia crime family and government informant
- Nicodemo Scarfo (1929–2017), mafioso and head of Scarfo crime family

== Film, television, and theater ==
=== A–K ===
- Joe Augustyn, writer and producer
- Kevin Bacon (born 1958), actor and half of The Bacon Brothers
- Jim Bailey (1938–2015), singer, film, television, and stage actor
- Chuck Barris (1929–2017), actor, composer, writer, director, producer, and game show host
- Ethel Barrymore (1879–1959), actress
- John Barrymore (1882–1942), actor
- Lionel Barrymore (1878–1954), actor, Mr. Potter in Frank Capra's It's a Wonderful Life
- Eddie Barth (1931–2010), actor and voiceover artist
- Jules Bass (1935–2022), director and composer
- Laurie Beechman (1953–1998), Broadway singer and actress
- Willam Belli (born 1982), actor, drag queen, model, and recording artist
- Maria Bello (born 1967), actress and writer
- Ed Bernard (born 1939), actor
- John Biddle (1925–2008), yachting cinematographer and lecturer
- Edward Binns (1916–1990), actor
- Joey Bishop (1918–2007), entertainer
- Danny Bonaduce (born 1959), actor
- David Boreanaz (born 1969), actor
- Jim Boyd (1933–2013), actor
- Peter Boyle (1935–2006), actor
- El Brendel (1890–1964), vaudeville comedian and actor
- David Brenner (1936–2014), stand-up comedian, actor, and author
- Richard Brooks (1912–1992), screenwriter, film director, novelist, and film producer
- Quinta Brunson (born 1989), actor, creator of Abbott Elementary
- Matt Bush (born 1986), actor, Adventureland
- Eugene Byrd (born 1975), actor
- Michael Callan (1935–2022), actor
- Gia Marie Carangi (1960–1986), supermodel
- Joan Carroll (born 1932), coloratura soprano
- Dick Clark (1929–2012), host, American Bandstand and Dick Clark's New Year's Rockin' Eve, game show host, and producer
- Bessie Clayton (1875–1948), Broadway, vaudeville, and burlesque specialty dancer and choreographer
- Imogene Coca (1908–2001), actress and comedian
- Nathan Cook (1950–1988), actor
- Bradley Cooper (born 1975), actor
- Catherine Corcoran, actress
- Bill Cosby (born 1937), comedian, actor, and author
- David Crane (born 1957), writer and producer
- Broderick Crawford (1911–1986), actor
- Susan Webb Cushman (1822–1859), stage actress
- Blythe Danner (born 1943), actress
- Mildred Davis (1901–1969), actress
- Bruce Davison (born 1946), actor
- John de Lancie (born 1948), actor
- Francis De Sales (1912–1988), actor
- Kim Delaney (born 1961), actress
- Kat Dennings (born 1986), actress
- Curly Joe DeRita (1909–1993), comedian, actor, and member of The Three Stooges
- John Doman (born 1945), actor, The Wire
- Mike Douglas (1920–2006), singer and television talk show host
- Gary Dourdan (born 1966), actor
- Rel Dowdell, filmmaker
- Ja'net Dubois (c. 1932–2020), actress and singer
- Cheryl Dunye (born 1966), director, writer, and producer
- Kevin Eubanks (born 1957), musician and leader of The Tonight Show Band
- Lola Falana (born 1942), dancer and actress
- Norman Fell (1924–1998), actor
- Tina Fey (born 1970), actress and comedian
- W. C. Fields (1880–1946), actor and comedian
- Mademoiselle Fifi (1890–1982), dancer
- Larry Fine (1902–1975), comedian, actor, and member of The Three Stooges
- Linda Fiorentino (c. 1958), actress
- Kate Flannery (born 1964), actress
- Jeremy Gable (born 1982), playwright and game designer
- John Gallaudet (1903–1983), actor
- Ralph Garman (born 1964), actor and radio personality
- Janet Gaynor (1906–1984), actress
- Richard Gere (born 1949), actor
- Todd Glass (born 1964), comedian
- Adam F. Goldberg (born 1976), television and film producer
- Robert X. Golphin (born 1982), actor and filmmaker
- Kate Gosselin (born 1975), reality television personality, Jon and Kate Plus Eight
- Bruce Graham (1925–2010), playwright
- Seth Green (born 1974), actor
- Chief Halftown (1917–2003), children's television personality
- Grayson Hall (1922–1985), television, film, and stage actress
- Charles Hallahan (1943–1997), television, film, and stage actor
- Veronica Hamel (born 1943), actress and model
- Rachel Harlow (born 1948), actress, nightclub hostess, and socialite
- Kevin Hart (born 1979), comedian and actor
- Rodney Harvey (1967–1998), actor
- Sherman Hemsley (1938–2012), actor
- Emmaline Henry (1928–1979), actress, I Dream of Jeannie
- Marc Lamont Hill (born 1978), television host
- Tigre Hill, producer and director
- Paul Hipp (born 1963), actor, musician, and producer
- Billie Holiday (1915–1959), singer
- Wendell Holland (born 1984), Survivor: Ghost Island winner
- Kevin Hooks (born 1958), actor and director
- Abby Huntsman (born 1986), co-host of The View
- Mark Indelicato (born 1994), actor, singer (Justin Suarez on Ugly Betty)
- Abbi Jacobson (born 1984), actress, comedian, and co-creator of Broad City
- Barry Jenner (1941–2016), actor
- Aleeza Ben Shalom, matchmaker, relationship coach, and author
- Clark Johnson (born 1954), actor and director
- Nicole Kassell (born 1972), director and writer
- George Kelly (1887–1974), playwright, screenwriter, director, and actor
- Grace Kelly (1929–1982), actress and Princess of Monaco
- Michael Kelly (born 1969), actor
- Irvin Kershner (1923–2010), director, The Empire Strikes Back
- Taylor Kinney (born 1981), actor, Vampire Diaries and Chicago Fire
- Jack Klugman (1922–2012), actor, The Odd Couple, Quincy, M.E., and You Again?

=== L-Z ===
- Patti LaBelle (born 1944), R&B and soul musician, actress, and entrepreneur
- Michael Landon (1936–1991), actor, producer, and director
- Mario Lanza (1921–1959), singer and actor
- Stan Lathan (born 1945), film producer, television producer, and director
- Andrew Lawrence (born 1988), actor
- Joey Lawrence (born 1976), actor
- Matthew Lawrence (born 1980), actor
- Raw Leiba (born 1975), actor, stuntman, and sports model
- Aaron Levinson, producer, musician
- Brooke Lewis (born 1975), actress, producer and television personality
- Shari Lewis (1933–1998), children's television personality
- Gene London (1931–2020), artist and local children's television personality
- Lisa Lopes (1971–2002), rapper, singer, songwriter, record producer, and dancer
- Donja R. Love, playwright
- Sidney Lumet (1924–2011), film director
- David Lynch (1946–2025), film director
- Jeanette MacDonald (1903–1965), actress and singer
- Stephen Macht (born 1942), actor
- Abby Mann (1927–2008), film writer and producer
- Melanie Mayron (born 1952), actress
- Adam Mazer, writer and Emmy winner
- Bob McAllister (1935–1998), children's television personality
- Andrea McArdle (born 1963), singer, actress, Broadway's original Annie
- Joan McCracken (1917–1961), dancer and actress
- Paul McCrane (born 1961), actor and musician
- Rob McElhenney (born 1977), actor and creator of It's Always Sunny in Philadelphia
- Andrew Repasky McElhinney (born 1978), film director, writer, Museum of Modern Art artist
- Adam McKay (born 1968), director and writer
- David Mirkin (born 1955), writer and director
- Silas Weir Mitchell (born 1969), actor
- Katherine Moennig (born 1977), actress
- Kelly Monaco (born 1976), model and actress
- George W. Munroe (1857–1932), actor famous for female impersonation
- Natalie Nevins (1925–2010), singer, The Lawrence Welk Show
- J. J. North (born 1964), actress
- Clifford Odets (1906–1963), playwright, director, and screenwriter
- Leslie Odom Jr. (born 1981), actor and singer
- Ana Ortiz (born 1971), actress, Hilda Suarez on Ugly Betty
- Daphne Oz (born 1986), author, television host on The Chew
- Holly Robinson Peete (born 1964), actress
- Lisa Peluso (born 1964), actress, Saturday Night Fever
- Gervase Peterson (born 1969), contestant, original season of Survivor
- Teddy Pendergrass (1950–2010), R&B and soul musician, lead singer for Harold Melvin & the Blue Notes
- Robert Picardo (born 1953), actor
- S. Henry Pincus (died 1915), actor, impresario, and inventor
- Noam Pitlik (1932–1999), actor, television director, and producer
- Jack Polito (born 1941), animator
- Jon Polito (1950–2016), actor, Miller's Crossing
- Da'Vine Joy Randolph (born 1986), Oscar-winning actress
- Joe Renzetti, musician, Oscar-winning film composer, The Buddy Holly Story
- Adele Ritchie (1874–1930), singer
- Matt Robinson (1937–2002), Sesame Street actor
- James Rolfe (born 1980), creator and star of Angry Video Game Nerd internet series and film director
- Lisa Roma (1892–1965), operatic soprano and music educator
- J. D. Roth (born 1968), actor and game show host
- Bob Saget (1956–2022), actor, comedian, and game show host
- Mathew St. Patrick (born 1968), actor
- Diane Salinger (born 1951), actress
- Camillia Sanes, actress, The Shield
- Jessica Savitch (1947–1983), local and national news broadcaster, NBC
- Bill Scott (1920–1985), voice actor, voice of Bullwinkle J. Moose, Mr. Peabody, and Dudley Do-Right
- Vivienne Segal (1897–1992), actress
- Susan Seidelman (born 1952), film director, television director, Desperately Seeking Susan and Sex and the City
- Howard Merrill Shelley (1879–1956), playwright
- Craig Shoemaker (born 1962), stand-up comedian and film and television producer
- Sonya Smith (born 1972), queen of telenovela, actress
- Jimmy Shubert, stand-up comedian
- M. Night Shyamalan (born 1970), film director, The Sixth Sense and Signs
- Penny Singleton (1908–2003), radio, film, and voice actress
- Jack Thomas Smith (born 1969), horror filmmaker
- Toukie Smith (born 1952), model and actress
- Will Smith (born 1968), actor, hip-hop recording artist, half of the duo DJ Jazzy Jeff & The Fresh Prince, record producer, four time Grammy-winner
- David Smyrl (1935–2016), actor and television writer, Sesame Street
- Harry Snodgrass (born 1963), sound designer, supervisor, and editor, Alien 3, Napoleon Dynamite, Hot Shots! Part Deux, Robin Hood Men in Tights
- Tom Snyder (1936–2007), news and entertainment personality, NBC
- Sally Starr (1923–2013), children's television personality
- Joey Stefano (1968–1994), dancer, actor, and gay porn star
- Parker Stevenson (born 1952), actor
- Charles Stone III (born 1966), film director and creator of Budweiser's "Whassup?" advertising campaign
- Holland Taylor (born 1943), actress
- Teller (born 1948), magician and half of Penn & Teller
- Frank Tinney (1878–1940), vaudeville comedian
- Paul F. Tompkins (born 1968), actor and comedian
- Jean Vander Pyl (1919–1999), actress, voice of Wilma Flintstone and Rosie the Robot Maid
- Tom Verica (born 1964), actor
- Nancy Walker (1922–1992), actress and director
- Brendan Walter (born 1986), actor, director, and guitarist
- Jeff Ward (born 1986), actor
- Wee Willie Webber (1929–2010), local radio and television personality
- John Sylvester White (1919–1988), television actor
- Karen Malina White (born 1965), actress
- Nafessa Williams, actress
- Kenya D. Williamson, actress and screenwriter
- Thomas F. Wilson (born 1959), actor and stand-up comic
- Danny Woodburn (born 1964), actor and comedian
- Ed Wynn (1886–1966), actor and comedian, Uncle Albert in Walt Disney's Mary Poppins
- John Zacherle (1918–2016), actor, producer, and television horror host

== Government and politics ==
- Leon Abbett (1836–1894), New Jersey governor
- Lynne Abraham (born 1941), Philadelphia district attorney
- William Allen (1704–1780), Philadelphia mayor
- Chris Bartlett (born 1966), LGBT activist
- Raj Bhakta (born 1975), congressional candidate and contestant, The Apprentice Season 2
- Brendan Boyle (born 1977), U.S. representative for Pennsylvania
- Michael J. Bradley (1897–1979), U.S. representative for Pennsylvania
- Winfield S. Braddock (1848–1920), Wisconsin State Assembly member
- Bob Brady (born 1945), member, U.S. House of Representatives, Philadelphia mayoral candidate, NBC Universal and Independence Blue Cross lobbyist
- Raymond J. Broderick (1914–2000), U.S. federal judge
- William T. Cahill (1912–1996), New Jersey governor
- Ashton Carter (born 1954), physicist, Harvard University professor, and U.S. Secretary of Defense
- Mike Chitwood (born 1963), sheriff of Volusia County, Florida
- Augusta Clark (1932–2013), librarian, politician, lawyer, and second African-American woman to serve on Philadelphia City Council
- Joseph S. Clark (1901–1990), Philadelphia mayor and U.S. senator
- Mark B. Cohen (born 1949), member, Pennsylvania House of Representatives, Democratic leader of Pennsylvania House, and chairman, House Labor Relations Committee
- Henry Conner (1837–1918), member, Wisconsin State Senate
- George M. Dallas (1792–1864), U.S. vice president
- Richardson Dilworth (1898–1974), attorney, Philadelphia district attorney, and Philadelphia mayor
- Dwight Evans (born 1954), U.S. representative for Pennsylvania
- George H. Earle Sr. (1823–1907), founder of the Republican Party, abolitionist, and lawyer who represented fugitive slaves
- Chaka Fattah (born 1956), member, U.S. House of Representatives and former Philadelphia mayoral candidate
- Douglas J. Feith (born 1953), undersecretary of Defense and Iraq policy adviser
- Tom Feeney (born 1958), Florida politician
- Brian Fitzpatrick (born 1973), U.S. representative for Pennsylvania
- James Forten (1766–1842), African-American businessman, abolitionist leader, and sailmaker
- Benjamin Franklin (1706–1790), Founding Father, polymath, writer, scientist, inventor, statesman, diplomat, printer, publisher, political philosopher
- Shirley Franklin (born 1945), Atlanta major
- Mifflin Wistar Gibbs (1823–1915), lawyer, judge, diplomat, and banker
- Benjamin Goldman (born 1960), political advisor
- W. Wilson Goode (born 1938), Philadelphia mayor
- W. Wilson Goode Jr. (born 1965), Philadelphia City Council at-large member
- Oscar Goodman (born 1939), attorney and former Las Vegas mayor
- James P. Gourley, Pennsylvania House of Representatives member
- William H. Gray (1941–2013), Baptist minister, U.S. House of Representatives member, and former United Negro College Fund president
- William J. Green III (born 1938), Philadelphia mayor and U.S. House of Representatives member
- Morgan Griffith (born 1958), U.S. representative for Virginia
- Simon Guggenheim (1867–1941), U.S. senator and philanthropist
- Alexander Haig (1924–2010), U.S. Secretary of State and White House Chief of Staff
- Richard Helms (1913–2002), Central Intelligence Agency director
- Charles W. Heyl (1857–1936), businessman, fire chief, and politician
- Michael Johns (born 1964), White House presidential speechwriter
- Ro Khanna (born 1976), U.S. representative from California
- Joseph L. Kun (1882–1961), judge, Philadelphia Court of Common Pleas
- George Landenberger (1879–1936), American Samoa governor
- Frank J. Larkin (born 1955), U.S. Senate sergeant at arms
- John J. McCloy (1895–1989), Chase Manhattan Bank and Ford Foundation chairman, assistant U.S. Secretary of War during World War II, and Allies' high commissioner of Germany
- Robert F. McDonnell (born 1954), Virginia governor
- Katie McGinty (born 1963), U.S. Senate nominee, chair, Council on Environmental Quality, and former chief of staff to Pennsylvania governor Tom Wolf
- J. Whyatt Mondesire (1949–2015), president, NAACP Philadelphia chapter
- Cecil B. Moore (1915–1979), Philadelphia city council member and civil rights activist
- Patrick Murphy (born 1973), member, U.S. House of Representatives
- Benjamin Netanyahu (born 1949), current prime minister of Israel
- Robert N.C. Nix Sr. (1898–1987), member, U.S. House of Representatives
- Michael A. Nutter (born 1957), Philadelphia mayor and member, Philadelphia City Council
- Dennis M. O'Brien (born 1952), member, Pennsylvania House of Representatives and Pennsylvania House of Representatives speaker
- Tony J. Payton Jr. (born 1981), member, Pennsylvania House of Representatives
- Boies Penrose (1860–1921), U.S. senator and party boss
- Harriet Forten Purvis (1810–1875), abolitionist leader
- Charles H. Ramsey (born 1950), Philadelphia police commissioner
- Samuel J. Randall (1828–1890), U.S. House of Representatives member and Speaker of the House
- Ed Rendell (born 1944), Pennsylvania governor, Philadelphia mayor, and Philadelphia district attorney
- Frank Rizzo (1920–1991), Philadelphia mayor and police commissioner
- John Robbins (1808–1880), U.S. House of Representatives member
- Lisa Blunt Rochester (born 1962), U.S. senator for Delaware
- Deborah Ross (born 1963), U.S. representative for North Carolina
- Cynthia M. Rufe (born 1948), U.S. federal judge
- Allyson Schwartz (born 1948), member, U.S. House of Representatives
- Keith Self (born 1953), U.S. representative for Texas
- Helen Singleton (born 1932), civil rights activist and Freedom Rider
- Thomas Smith (born 1805), Indiana Supreme Court justice, Pennsylvania General Assembly member, and writer
- Arlen Specter (1930–2012), U.S. senator and Philadelphia district attorney
- Ben Stahl (1915–1998), labor leader and activist
- John F. Street (born 1943), Philadelphia mayor
- Milton Street (1941–2022), entrepreneur, Pennsylvania state legislator, and Philadelphia City Council candidate
- Norman Sussman (1905–1969), Wisconsin state senator
- Joel Barlow Sutherland (1792–1861), member, U.S. House of Representatives
- Al Taubenberger (born 1953), Philadelphia mayoral candidate
- John Timoney (1948–2016), Philadelphia police commissioner and Miami police chief
- Gregory Tony (born 1978), Sheriff of Broward County, Florida
- C. Delores Tucker (1927–2005), civil rights activist and Pennsylvania Secretary of State
- Anna C. Verna (1931–2021), Philadelphia City Council member and president
- Charles A. Waters (1892–1972), Pennsylvania auditor general, state treasurer, and president judge of the Philadelphia County Court of Common Pleas
- R. Seth Williams (born 1967), Philadelphia district attorney
- Fernando Wood (1812–1881), mayor of New York

== Historical figures ==
- David Hayes Agnew (1818–1892), surgeon and teacher
- Robert Aitken (1734–1802), publisher of first Bible in North America
- Louisa May Alcott (1832–1888), novelist
- Andrew Allen (1740–1825), delegate to Continental Congress
- Harrison Allen (1841–1897), anatomist and physician
- Joseph Anderson (1757–1837), United States senator
- Henry Graham Ashmead (1838–1920), historian of Delaware County, Pennsylvania
- Mary Stevens Beall (1854–1917), historian, writer, librarian
- Charles John Biddle (1819–1873), U.S. House of Representatives member
- Edward Biddle (1738–1779), Founding Father, soldier, lawyer, statesman, and delegate to Continental Congress
- Francis Biddle (1886–1968), U.S. solicitor general, U.S. attorney general, and Nuremberg trials principal judge
- Nicholas Biddle (1786–1844), financier and Second Bank of the United States president
- Nicholas Biddle (1750–1778), Continental Navy original captain
- Richard Biddle (1796–1847), U.S. House of Representatives member
- John C. Bowers (1811–1873), entrepreneur, organist, and vestryman, and founding member of first Grand United Order of Odd Fellows
- Thomas Bowers (c. 1823–1885), concert artist
- Ed Bradley (1941–2006), CBS News radio journalist and television journalist
- Henry "Box" Brown (c.1815–1897), abolitionist who escaped to freedom by arranging to have himself mailed in crate to abolitionists in Philadelphia
- William C. Bullitt Jr. (1891–1967), diplomat who conducted special mission to negotiate with Vladimir Lenin on behalf of the Paris Peace Conference; first U.S. ambassador to Soviet Union; U.S. ambassador to France during World War II
- Hetty Burr (c. 1796–1862), abolitionist and clubwoman
- John Pierre Burr (1792–1864), abolitionist and community leader. He was an illegitimate child of Aaron Burr
- Bebe Moore Campbell (1950–2006), author, journalist, and teacher
- Samuel Carpenter (1649–1714), first Pennsylvania treasurer and deputy governor to William Penn
- Octavius Valentine Catto (1839–1871), educator, civil rights activist, and baseball player
- Emilie Davis (1839–1889), writer who kept American Civil War diary
- Emma V. Day (1853–1895), missionary to Liberia
- Marguerite de Angeli (1889–1987), author and illustrator
- Branson DeCou (1892–1941), photographer and traveler
- Sarah Jane Corson Downs (1822–1891), president, New Jersey Woman's Christian Temperance Union
- Benjamin Franklin (1705–1790), American Founding Father and polymath
- Harriet Schneider French (1824–1906), physician and temperance movement activist
- Henry George (1839–1897), political economist and author, inspired economic philosophy known as Georgism
- T. Adelaide Goodno (1858–1931), social reformer
- Charlotte Forten Grimké (1837–1914), abolitionist, poet, and educator
- Benjamin Guggenheim (1865–1912), businessman who died aboard the RMS Titanic
- Andrew Harris, abolitionist and minister; first African-American to graduate from the University of Vermont
- John von Sonnentag de Havilland (1826–1886), American officer of arms in England
- A. Leon Higginbotham Jr. (1928–1998), Kerner Commission commissioner, U.S. Court of Appeals for the Third Circuit judge, and Presidential Medal of Freedom recipient
- Antonija Höffern (1803–1871), Slovenian noblewoman and educator, first Slovenian woman to immigrate to the United States
- John A. Hostetler (1918–2001), author, educator, and Amish and Hutterite scholar
- Rebecca Jones (1739–1818), Quaker minister and educator
- Grace Kelly (1929–1982), princess of Monaco and actress
- George Lippard (1822–1854), novelist, journalist, playwright, social activist, and labor organizer
- Alain LeRoy Locke (1885–1954), writer, Harlem Renaissance figure, and first African-American Rhodes Scholar
- Henry C. McCook (1837–1911), entomologist, clergyman, author, and Philadelphia city flag designer
- Joseph McKenna (1843–1926), U.S. Supreme Court associate justice, U.S. attorney general, and U.S. House of Representatives member
- Thomas Mifflin (1744–1800), Continental Army major general, fifth president of U.S. Congress, first Pennsylvania governor, and Founding Father
- Anna Balmer Myers (1884–1972), author
- Robert N. C. Nix Jr. (1928–2003), chief justice, Supreme Court of Pennsylvania
- Mrs. A. M. Palmer (1848–1923), clubwoman and civic leader
- Anne Parrish (1760–1800), Quaker philanthropist
- George W. Pepper (1867–1961), attorney and U.S. senator
- William Pepper (1843–1898), Free Library of Philadelphia founder and University of Pennsylvania provost
- Henry L. Phillips (1847–1947), African-American social reformer and Episcopal priest; born in Jamaica
- Philip Syng Physick (1768–1837), physician known as the "father of American surgery"
- Charles Burleigh Purvis (1842–1929), physician, co-founder of Howard University Medical School, and the first black physician to attend a sitting president (James A. Garfield)
- Marcus Aurelius Root (1808–1888), leading daguerreotypist and author
- Betsy Ross (1752–1836), sewed first American flag known as the Betsy Ross flag
- Benjamin Rush (1746–1813), physician, politician, social reformer, humanitarian, educator, and Founding Father who signed the Declaration of Independence
- Nikola Rušinović (1908–1993), Independent State of Croatia's unofficial envoy to the Holy See during World War II
- Peggy Shippen (1760–1804), to American Revolution traitor Benedict Arnold and highest-paid spy in the American Revolution
- Leon Sullivan (1922–2001), Baptist minister and social activist
- Manuel Torres (1762–1822), first Colombian ambassador to the U.S.
- Thomas Truxton (1755–1822), naval officer who rose to commodore
- Frank J. Webb (1828–c. 1894), novelist, poet, essayist, and writer

== Media and literature ==
- Isaac Ashmead (1790–1870), printer who served in the War of 1812
- Isaac Asimov (1920–1992), science fiction author
- Tony Auth (1942–2014), editorial cartoonist and Pulitzer Prize and Herblock Prize winner
- Doug Banks (1958–2016), nationally syndicated morning radio host
- Leslie Esdaile Banks (1959–2011), author
- Donald Barthelme (1931–1989), author
- Stan and Jan Berenstain (1923–2005), children's writing and illustration couple
- Evelyn Berckman (1900–1978), author
- Ben Bova (1932–2020), science fiction author
- Mary D. R. Boyd (1809–1893), children's book author
- Ed Bradley (1941–2006), journalist, 60 Minutes
- Tony Bruno (born 1952), sports radio talk show host
- Maxwell Struthers Burt (1882–1954), novelist, poet, and author
- Nathaniel Burt (1913–2003), novelist, poet, composer, and author
- Francesca Anna Canfield (1803–1833), linguist and writer
- Angelo Cataldi (born 1951), sports radio host
- Renee Chenault-Fattah (born 1957), WCAU-TV news anchor and wife of U.S. Representative Chaka Fattah
- Mary M. Cohen (1854–1911), social economist, journalist, belletrist, and educator
- Fritz Coleman (born 1948), KNBC chief meteorologist
- Michael Connelly (born 1956), author
- Benjamin De Casseres (1873–1945), journalist, critic, essayist, and poet
- Joseph Dennie (1768–1812), essaysist, The Lay Preacher, and The Port Folio founding editor
- Pete Dexter (born 1943), journalist, novelist, and National Book Award-winner
- Catharine H. Esling (1812–1897), hymn writer and poet
- John Facenda (1913–1984), broadcaster and sports announcer
- Courtney Friel (born 1980), KTLA-TV news anchor and reporter
- Charles Fuller (1939–2022), playwright, Pulitzer Prize for Drama recipient, and Tony Award for Best Revival of a Play winner
- Jim Gardner (born 1948), WPVI-TV news anchor
- Mike Golic (born 1962), ESPN radio and television personality, Philadelphia Eagles professional football player
- David Goodis (1917–1967), author
- Terry Gross (born 1951), radio host and co-executive producer, Fresh Air
- John Harvey (born 1951), radio and television personality
- Evalena Fryer Hedley (1865–1943), journalist, editor, and author
- James Fallows (born 1949), author and journalist
- Aries Keck, author and radio reporter
- Suzy Kolber (born 1964), television sportscaster
- Andrea Kremer (born 1959), television sportscaster
- Bob Lassiter (1945–2006), left-wing radio host
- Mark Levin (born 1957), lawyer, author, and radio personality
- Rachel Levin (born 1995), YouTuber, and beauty guru
- Jonathan Maberry (born 1958), suspense author, anthology editor, comic book writer, magazine feature writer, playwright, content creator, writing teacher and lecturer
- Michelle Malkin (born 1970), political commentator
- Chris Matthews (born 1945), NBC and MSNBC journalist and talk show host
- Edith May (1827–1903), writer and poet
- Brian McDonough, medical editor, author, and physician
- Jim McKay (1921–2008), ABC sports journalist
- Chris McKendry (born 1968), ESPN SportsCenter anchor
- Larry Mendte (born 1957), KYW-TV news anchor
- James A. Michener (1907–1997), author
- Aubertine Woodward Moore (1841–1929), musician, writer, musical critic, translator, and lecturer
- Frances Trego Montgomery (1858–1925), children's book writer
- Christopher Morley (1890–1957), novelist, short-story writer, and poet
- Wesley Morris (born 1975), film critic and podcast host
- Thom Nickels, author and journalist
- Joe Queenan (born 1950), author and humorist
- Matthew Quick (born 1973), author, The Silver Linings Playbook
- Edgar Allan Poe (1809–1849), novelist and short-story writer
- Chaim Potok (1929–2002), novelist and author, The Chosen and The Promise
- Richard P. Powell (1908–1999), novelist
- Beasley Reece (born 1954), KYW-TV sports journalist and former professional football player, Philadelphia Eagles
- Dave Roberts (born 1936), WPVI-TV meteorologist and former co-host, AM Philadelphia
- Lisa Scottoline (born 1955), author and attorney
- Peter Shellem (1960–2009), Patriot News journalist who obtained release of five wrongfully convicted innocent people
- Vai Sikahema (born 1962), WCAU-TV sports journalist and former professional football player, Philadelphia Eagles
- Michael Smerconish (born 1962), WPHT-AM radio talk show host, Philadelphia Daily News columnist, and MSNBC political analyst
- Anna Bustill Smith (1862–1945), author, genealogist, and suffragist
- Stephen A. Smith (born 1967), ESPN radio and television personality, Philadelphia Inquirer sports columnist
- Arthur R. G. Solmssen (1928–2018), attorney and novelist
- Louise Stockton (1838–1914), author, journalist, club organizer
- Kristie Lu Stout (born 1974), journalist
- Duane Swierczynski (born 1972), author and former Philadelphia City Paper editor
- Jake Tapper (born 1969), author, journalist
- Omar Tyree (born 1969), author
- Jeannette Walworth (1835–1918), novelist and journalist
- Ukee Washington (born 1958), KYW-TV news anchor
- Jesse Watters (born 1978), political commentator and author
- Jennifer Weiner (born 1970), author
- Kristen Welker (born 1976), television journalist and NBC News White House correspondent
- William Wharton (1925–2008), author, Birdy
- Walt Whitman (1819–1892), poet, essayist, and journalist

== Military figures ==
- Henry Harley "Hap" Arnold (1886–1950), U.S. Army general, Air Force general, and World War I hero known as "father of the U.S. Air Force"
- Upton Birnie Jr. (1877–1957), US Army major general, raised and educated in Philadelphia
- Albert Blithe (1923–1967), U.S. Army paratrooper featured in Band of Brothers
- Louis H. Carpenter (1839–1916), Brigadier General, Medal of Honor recipient and veteran, Civil War, American Indian War, and Spanish–American War
- George F. Good Jr. (1901–1991), U.S. Marine Corps lieutenant general, commanded Marine defense battalions during World War II
- William Guarnere (1923–2014), U.S. Army staff sergeant featured in Band of Brothers
- Alexander Haig (1924–2010), U.S. military officer, diplomat, U.S. Secretary of State
- Edward Heffron (1923–2013), U.S. Army Private featured in Band of Brothers
- Nelson Henry (1923–2020), U.S. Army Private
- Washington Hood (1808–1840), captain, U.S. Army Corps of Topographical Engineers
- Joseph Howell Jr. (1750–1798), major, Paymaster-General of the United States Army
- John Lawson (1837–1919), U.S. Navy sailor and Medal of Honor recipient
- Robert Leckie (1920–2001), U.S. Marine Corps veteran of World War II, author, and journalist
- George B. McClellan (1826–1885), Union Army general and presidential candidate
- H. R. McMaster (born 1962), major general and presidential chief of staff
- John J. McVeigh (1921–1944), Medal of Honor recipient for actions during Battle for Brest
- George Gordon Meade (1815–1872), Union army general and victor at the Battle of Gettysburg
- Charles Miller (1862–1928), resident of Bridesburg, US Army officer who served as Commandant of the United States Army Command and General Staff College
- Thomas H. Neill (1826–1885), Union Army general
- John C. Pemberton (1814–1881), Commander of Confederate defenders at Siege of Vicksburg
- Charles Sutherland (1831–1895), Surgeon General of U.S. Army
- Jack Thayer (1894–1945), World War I veteran, railway businessman, and Titanic survivor.
- Franklin W. Ward (1870–1938), Adjutant General of New York

== Music ==
- Andrew Adgate (1762–1793), musician, founder of music schools, and choir director
- Al Alberts (1922–2009), singer, The Four Aces
- Alex G (born 1993), singer-songwriter
- Marian Anderson (1897–1993), opera singer and contralto
- Frankie Avalon (born 1940), singer and actor
- Baauer (born 1989), DJ and producer
- Rachel Bagby, author, composer, singer, and composer
- Bahamadia (born 1966), rapper
- Pearl Bailey (1918–1990), singer, dancer, and actress
- Charli Baltimore (born 1974), hip hop artist
- Samuel Barber (1910–1981), composer, pianist, conductor, baritone, music educator, and composer
- All members of Grayscale, rock band
- Len Barry (1942–2020), recording star, vocalist, songwriter, lyricist, record producer, author, and poet
- Toni Basil (born 1943), singer, "Mickey"
- Eric Bazilian (born 1953), singer and musician, co-founder of The Hooters
- Jeanne Behrend (1911–1988), pianist, musicologist, music educator, and composer
- Diane Meredith Belcher (born 1960), concert organist, teacher, and church musician
- Steve Berlin (born 1955), keyboardist and saxophone player, Los Lobos
- Emile Berliner (1851–1929), inventor of the flat disc record, the gramophone, founder of Victor Talking Machine Company, and Gramophone Company
- Frankie Beverly (1946–2024, R&B singer and musician, founder and lead singer of Maze featuring Frankie Beverly
- Charlie Biddle (1926–2003), jazz bassist
- Bilal (born 1979), neo-soul singer and musician
- Cindy Birdsong (born 1939), founding member, Labelle, and replacement member, Diana Ross & the Supremes
- Joe Bonsall (born 1948), country music singer and member of The Oak Ridge Boys
- Dante Bucci (1980–2014), handpan musician
- Lil Dicky (born 1988), rapper
- Solomon Burke (1940–2010), R&B singer
- Uri Caine (born 1956), composer, arranger, and jazz pianist
- Cassidy (born 1982), rapper
- Sarah Chang (born 1980), child prodigy violinist with major orchestras
- Chubby Checker (born 1941), singer
- Stanley Clarke (born 1951), bassist
- Alice Cohen (born 1958), singer and songwriter known as Alice Desoto
- John Coltrane (1926–1967), jazz saxophonist
- Norman Connors (born 1947), singer
- Tommy Conwell (born 1962), guitarist, songwriter, and performer
- Cool C (born 1969), rapper
- Jim Croce (1943–1973), singer
- Dalex (born 1990), singer
- James Darren (1936–2024), singer and actor
- Rick DeJesus (born 1983), lead singer, Adelitas Way
- James DePreist (1936–2013), orchestra conductor
- Dieselboy (born 1972), drum and bass DJ and producer
- Fred Diodati, lead singer, The Four Aces
- Diplo (born 1978), DJ and producer
- Bill Doggett (1916–1996), jazz and R&B organist and pianist
- Gail Ann Dorsey (born 1962), bassist
- Charles Earland (1941–1999), organist
- Nathan East (born 1955), jazz, R&B, rock bass player, and vocalist
- Kevin Eubanks (born 1957), jazz guitarist
- Robin Eubanks (born 1955), jazz trombonist
- Duane Eubanks (born 1969), jazz trumpeter
- Eve (born 1978), rapper and actress
- Fabian (born 1943), singer and actor
- Nick Falcon (born 1968), guitarist, composer, lyricist, and singer
- Sheila Ferguson (born 1947), singer, The Three Degrees
- Wilhelmenia Fernandez (born 1949), opera singer and soprano
- Rachelle Ferrell (born 1961), jazz vocalist
- Eddie Fisher (1928–2010), singer and actor
- Sam Fogarino (born 1968), rock music drummer, Interpol
- Freeway (born 1978), rapper
- Kenny Gamble (born 1943), producer and co-founder, Philadelphia International Records
- Melody Gardot (born 1985), jazz singer
- Stan Getz (1927–1991), jazz saxophonist
- Benny Golson (1929–2024), jazz saxophonist
- Charlie Gracie (1936–2022), rock singer
- Gogi Grant (1924–2016), singer, "The Wayward Wind"
- Anthony Green (born 1982), singer, Saosin and Circa Survive
- Vivian Green (born 1979), R&B singer
- Daryl Hall (born 1946), singer and half of Hall & Oates duo
- Joseph Hallman (born 1979), composer, arranger, singer, and producer
- Rufus Harley (1936–2006), jazz musician and first jazz musician to use Great Highland bagpipe as primary instrument
- Robert Hazard (1948–2008), new wave musician and composer
- Albert Heath (born 1935), jazz drummer
- Jimmy Heath (1926–2020), jazz saxophonist
- Percy Heath (1923–2005), jazz bassist
- Leon Huff (born 1942), producer and co-founder, Philadelphia International Records
- Phyllis Hyman (1949–1995), R&B and jazz vocalist
- Hiroshi Iizuka (born 1945), luthier known for innovations in viola design, born in Japan but immigrated to Philadelphia in 1977
- DJ Jazzy Jeff (born 1965), hip-hop DJ, neo-soul producer, and half DJ Jazzy Jeff & the Fresh Prince duo
- Joan Jett (born 1958), rock musician
- Philly Joe Jones (1923–1985), jazz drummer
- Kitty Kallen (1921–2016), pop singer
- Jason Karaban, singer and songwriter
- Tom Keifer (born 1961), glam metal vocalist, Cinderella
- Keith (born 1949), singer who wrote "98.6"
- Bill Kenny (1914–1978), singer
- Khia (born 1977), rapper
- King Britt (born 1968), house DJ and producer
- Kurupt (born 1972), rapper
- Patti LaBelle (born 1944), R&B & soul singer and actress
- Mario Lanza (1921–1959), operatic singer
- Lil Uzi Vert (born 1995), rapper and hip hop artist
- Lynda Laurence (born 1949), part of Stevie Wonder's backup group The Third Generation and part of The Supremes
- Amos Lee (born 1977), folk and blues singer
- Lisa "Left Eye" Lopes (1971–2002), member, TLC
- Monie Love (born 1970), rapper and radio personality
- Leonard MacClain (1899–1967), theatre organist
- Al Martino (1927–2009), singer and actor, Johnny Fontane in The Godfather
- Pat Martino (1944–2021), jazz guitarist
- Barbara Mason (born 1947), R&B singer and composer
- Christian McBride (born 1972), jazz bassist
- Marian Anderson (1897–1993), gospel singer
- Marshmello (born 1992), DJ and producer
- Meek Mill (born 1987), rapper
- Lizzy McAlpine (born 1999), singer and songwriter
- Ms. Jade (born 1979), hip hop artist
- Lee Morgan (1938–1972), jazz trumpeter and composer
- James Mtume (1946–2022), R&B and jazz musician and founder of Mtume
- Musiq Soulchild (born 1977), R&B and neo-soul singer
- James E. Myers (1919–2001), songwriter, actor, and co-writer of "Rock Around the Clock"
- Marc Nelson (born 1971), R&B singer, Boyz II Men and Az Yet
- Lobo Nocho (1919–1997), jazz singer
- John Oates (born 1948), singer and half of Hall & Oates duo
- Maurie Orodenker (1908–1993), journalist, music critic, and advertising agency executive who coined the term "rock and roll"
- Hugh Panaro (born 1964), tenor singer, Broadway and opera
- Billy Paul (1934–2016), Grammy Award-winning soul singer
- Vinnie Paz (born 1977), rapper, founder of Jedi Mind Tricks and Army of the Pharaohs
- Peedi Peedi (born 1977), rapper
- Teddy Pendergrass (1950–2010), R&B singer, Harold Melvin & the Blue Notes
- Christina Perri (born 1986), singer
- Vincent Persichetti (1915–1987), composer and music educator
- Pink (born 1979), R&B and rock music singer
- Fayette Pinkney (1948–2009), singer, The Three Degrees
- Trudy Pitts (1932–2010), jazz keyboardist
- Princess Superstar (born 1971), hip hop performer
- Questlove (born 1971), drummer, producer, DJ, writer, journalist, and photographer
- Sun Ra (1914–1993), jazz pianist and band leader
- Danny Rapp (1941–1983), singer, Danny & the Juniors
- Joe Renzetti, guitarist and Oscar Award winner
- Res, R&B singer
- RJD2 (born 1976), producer
- Paul Robeson (1898–1976), singer, activist, attorney, and All-American collegiate athlete
- PnB Rock (1991–2022), rapper
- Jack Rose (1971–2009), guitarist
- Todd Rundgren (born 1948), musician, singer, songwriter, and producer
- Bobby Rydell (born 1942–2022), singer and actor
- Santigold (born 1976), punk singer
- John Sebastian (1914–1980), classical harmonica player and composer
- Danny Sembello (1963–2015), R&B singer, songwriter, record producer, and multi-instrumentalist
- Michael Sembello (born 1954), R&B singer, guitarist, keyboardist, and songwriter
- Schoolly D (born 1962), rapper
- Jill Scott (born 1972), R&B and neo-soul singer
- Shirley Scott (1934–2002), organist
- Dee Dee Sharp (born 1945), singer and actress
- Gene Shay (1935–2020), folk music musician
- Oscar Shumsky (1917–2000), violinist and conductor
- Beanie Sigel (born 1974), rapper
- Bunny Sigler (1941–2017), R&B singer, multi-instrumentalist, composer, and producer
- Steady B (born 1969), rapper
- Jazmine Sullivan (born 1987), R&B and soul singer-songwriter, 2-time Grammy award winner, and 2-time BET Award-winner
- Taylor Swift (born 1989), singer-songwriter, 14-time Grammy award winner, 2023 Apple Music Artist of the year
- William Takacs (born 1973), trumpet player
- Tammi Terrell (1945–1970), soul, R&B, and Motown singer
- Russell Thompkins Jr. (born 1951), soul and R&B singer
- Tariq "Black Thought" Trotter (born 1973), lead MC and co-founder, The Roots
- Robbie Tronco, DJ
- Ira Tucker (1925–2008), lead singer, The Dixie Hummingbirds
- McCoy Tyner (1938–2020), jazz pianist and composer, John Coltrane quartet
- Charlie Ventura (born 1916), tenor saxophonist and band leader
- Kurt Vile (born 1980), guitarist and vocalist
- Lee Ving (born 1950), singer and songwriter, frontman of hardcore punk band Fear
- Johannes von Trapp (born 1939), singer and member of Trapp Family
- Evan Sewell Wallace (1982–2017), singer, songwriter, and rapper known as "E-Dubble"
- Clara Ward (1924–1973), gospel singer
- Grover Washington Jr. (1943–1999), jazz saxophonist and founder of smooth jazz genre
- Crystal Waters (born 1961), dance and house music singer
- Ethel Waters (1896–1977), blues singer and actress
- André Watts (1946–2023), pianist
- Tierra Whack (born 1995), rapper and singer
- Pamela Williams (born 1963), jazz saxophonist
- Josh Wink (born 1970), DJ and electronic music producer
- Emily Yacina, singer-songwriter
- Karen Young (1951–1991), disco singer

== Sports ==
- Chris Achuff (born 1975), defensive line coach, Syracuse University
- John Abadie (1854–1905), professional baseball player, Brooklyn Atlantics and Philadelphia Athletics
- Cal Abrams (1924–1997), professional baseball player, Baltimore Orioles, Brooklyn Dodgers, Chicago White Sox, Cincinnati Reds, and Pittsburgh Pirates
- Chris Albright (born 1979), soccer player who represented the United States national team
- Dick Allen (1942–2020), professional baseball player, Chicago White Sox, Oakland Athletics, Los Angeles Dodgers, Philadelphia Phillies, and St. Louis Cardinals, National League Rookie of the Year, and seven-time All-Star
- Anthony Allison (born 1987), soccer player
- Doug Allison (1846–1916), first professional baseball player ever to use a baseball glove
- Eddie Alvarez (born 1984), mixed martial artist, ONE Championship, UFC Lightweight Champion
- Rubén Amaro Jr. (born 1965), professional baseball player, general manager, and coach
- Dan Antoniuk (born 1981), soccer player
- Walter Bahr (1927–2018), soccer player, manager, and National Soccer Hall of Fame inductee
- Deion Barnes (born 1993), professional football player, Kansas City Chiefs and New York Jets
- Barry Barto (born 1950), soccer player and coach
- Reds Bassman (1913–2010), professional football player, Philadelphia Eagles
- Bert Bell (1895–1959), founder of Philadelphia Eagles football team and former NFL commissioner
- Erwin Bergdoll (1890–1965), former auto racer and draft dodger; brother of Grover Bergdoll
- Barney Berlinger (1908–2002), 1928 Summer Olympics decathlete
- Mohini Bhardwaj (born 1978), 2004 Summer Olympics gymnast
- Tyrell Biggs (born 1960), boxer, 1984 Summer Olympics gold medalist
- Audrey Bleiler (1933–1975), All-American Girls Professional Baseball League player, South Bend Blue Sox
- Chaim Bloom (born 1983), Boston Red Sox chief baseball officer
- Tony Bono (born 1963), soccer player
- Thomas Brennan (1922–2003), professional hockey player, Boston Bruins
- Charles Brewer (born 1969), boxer and IBF super middleweight champion
- Derek Bryant (born 1971), former heavyweight boxer
- Roy Campanella (1921–1993), professional baseball player, three-time National League Most Valuable Player
- Abdul Carter (born 2003), professional football player
- Gene Chyzowych (1935–2014), soccer player and coach
- Ben Clime (1891–1973), professional football player
- Randall "Tex" Cobb (born 1950), boxer and actor
- Tim Cooney (born 1990), professional baseball player
- Don Cohan (1930–2018), 1972 Olympic bronze medalist, sailing
- Brian Cohen (born 1976), professional boxer
- Julia Cohen (born 1989), professional tennis player
- Steve Coleman (born 1950), professional football player
- Bobby Convey (born 1983), soccer player who represented the United States national team
- Tyrone Crawley (1958–2021), boxer
- Fran Crippen (1984–2010), professional swimmer
- Maddy Crippen (born 1980), swimmer in 2000 Olympics
- Ray Culp (born 1941), Phillies right-handed pitcher and runner-up to Dick Allen for National League Rookie of the Year
- Steve Cunningham (born 1976), boxer and cruiserweight champion
- Matthew "Super" DeLisi (born 2000), esports player
- Ollie Dobbins (born 1941), football player
- CJ dos Santos (born 2000), soccer player who represented the Cape Verde national team
- Buster Drayton (born 1952), boxer and light middleweight (super welterweight) champion
- Jon Drummond (born 1968), track and field athlete, 1996 and 2000 Olympic medalist
- Dave Dunaway (1945–2001), professional football player
- Angelo Dundee (1921–2012), boxing trainer
- Fred Dunlap (1859–1902), professional baseball player
- John Edelman (born 1935), professional baseball player
- Gary Emanuel (born 1958), defensive line coach, Atlanta Falcons
- Jahri Evans (born 1983), professional football player
- Paul Felder (born 1984), mixed martial artist with UFC and Cage Fury Fighting Championships
- Craig Fitzgerald, professional football coach
- Joe Flacco (born 1985), professional football player
- Francine Fournier (born 1972), professional wrestling valet, Extreme Championship Wrestling
- Joe Frazier (1944–2011), boxer, 1964 Olympic gold medalist and former world heavyweight champion
- Marvis Frazier (born 1960), boxer
- Harry Fritz (1890–1974), baseball player
- Jim "Sandman" Fullington (born 1963), professional wrestler, Extreme Championship Wrestling and WWE
- Mark Gerban (born 1979), first world champion rower, Palestine
- Eddie George (born 1973), professional football player and Heisman Trophy winner
- Kerry Getz (born 1975), professional skateboarder
- Joey Giardello (1930–2008), professional boxer and middleweight champion
- Brent Grimes (born 1983), professional football player
- Randy Grossman (born 1952), professional football player and four-time Super Bowl Champion
- Mark Gubicza (born 1962), professional baseball player
- Drew Gulak (born 1987), professional wrestler
- Brendan Hansen (born 1981), Olympic swimmer
- Eric Harding (born 1972), boxer
- Marvin Harrison (born 1972), professional football player
- Kirk Hershey (1918–1979), professional football player
- Bill Holland (1907–1984), 1949 Indianapolis 500 winner and three-time second-place finisher
- Bernard Hopkins (born 1965), boxer and world middleweight champion
- Demetrius Hopkins (born 1980), boxer
- Michael Iaconelli (born 1972), professional bass angler and winner of 2003 Bassmaster Classic
- Reggie Jackson (born 1946), Hall of Fame baseball player
- Judith Jamison (born 1943), dancer; choreographer, and artistic director, Alvin Ailey American Dance Theater
- Joe Judge (born 1981), professional football head coach, New York Giants
- Gabe Kapler (born 1976), professional baseball player and manager
- John B. Kelly Sr. (1889–1960), triple Olympic gold medal winner, rowing
- John B. Kelly Jr. (1927–1985), champion rower
- Florian Kempf (born 1956), football player
- Matt Kilroy (1866–1940), professional baseball player
- Sam Kimber (1854–1925), professional baseball player
- Bart King (1873–1965), cricket bowler
- Darnell Kittrell (born 1975), professional wrestler
- Kenny Koplove (born 1993), baseball player
- Mike Koplove (born 1976), professional baseball pitcher
- Julian Krinsky, tennis player
- Rick Lackman (1910–1990), professional football player
- Dave LaCrosse (born 1955), professional player
- Bernie Lemonick, football player and coach
- Sonny Liston (c.1930–c. 1970), boxer and world heavyweight champion
- Tommy Loughran (1902–1982), boxer and light heavyweight champion
- Harry Luff (1856–1916), Major League Baseball player
- John Macionis (1916–2012), Olympic swimmer, 1936 silver medalist
- Brooke Makler (1951–2010), Olympic fencer
- Paul Makler Jr. (born 1946), Olympic fencer
- Paul Makler Sr. (1920–2022), Olympic fencer
- Donovan McNabb (born 1976), professional football player, Philadelphia Eagles
- Dick McBride (1847–1916), baseball player and manager
- John McDermott (1891–1971), professional golfer
- Benny McLaughlin (1928–2012), professional soccer player and member, U.S. Soccer Hall of Fame
- Jake Metz (born 1991), football player
- Levi Meyerle (1849–1921), professional baseball player
- Nate Miller (born 1963), boxer and cruiserweight champion
- Alvin Mitchell (born 1943), football player
- Tony Morgano (1913–1984), boxer
- Willie Mosconi (1913–1993), professional billiards player
- Matthew Saad Muhammad (1954–2014), boxer and light heavyweight champion
- Browning Nagle (born 1968), professional football player
- Kathryn Nesbitt (born 1988), professional soccer assistant referee
- Vince Papale (born 1946), professional football player, inspiration for the movie Invincible
- Kyle Pitts (born 2000), professional football player, Atlanta Falcons
- Mike Powell (born 1963), track and field athlete, 1988 and 1992 Olympic silver medalist and current long jump world record holder
- Zahir Raheem (born 1976), boxer and 1996 Olympian
- Merrill Reese (born 1942), Philadelphia Eagles radio broadcaster
- David Reid (born 1973), boxer, 1996 Olympic gold medalist, light middleweight
- Stevie Richards (born 1971), professional wrestler, Extreme Championship Wrestling and WWE
- Robin Roberts (1926–2010), Phillies right-handed pitcher, Cy Young Award recipient, and member of the Baseball Hall of Fame
- Ivan Robinson (born 1971), boxer
- Allen Rosenberg (1931–2013), rower and rowing coach
- Mike Schmidt (born 1949), Phillies Golden Glove third baseman and member of Baseball Hall of Fame
- Carol Schultz Greenberg, lacrosse player
- Vic Seixas (1923–2024), tennis player
- Kirk Shelmerdine (born 1958), NASCAR driver and crew chief
- Ed Sheridan (born 1957), retired professional soccer player
- Steve Slaton (born 1986), NFL player
- Gunboat Smith (1887–1974), boxer turned actor and boxing referee
- Frank Spellman (1922–2017), Olympic champion weightlifter
- David Starr (born 1991), professional wrestler
- John Sterling (1865–1908), professional baseball player
- Harry Stovey (1856–1937), professional baseball player
- Joe Sugden (1870–1959), professional baseball player
- Cavan Sullivan (born 2009), professional soccer player; youngest person to appear in a league match for a major professional league in the United States
- Quinn Sullivan (born 2004), professional soccer player
- Eric Tangradi (born 1989), professional hockey player
- Meldrick Taylor (born 1966), boxer, 1984 Olympic gold medalist, welterweight and junior welterweight champion
- Aaron Torres (born 1978), boxer and contestant on The Contender 2
- Najai Turpin (1981–2005), boxer and contestant on The Contender
- Harp Vaughan (1903–1978), professional football player
- Iosif Vitebskiy (born 1938), Soviet/Ukrainian Olympic medalist and world champion fencer and fencing coach
- John Waerig (born 1976), professional football player
- Steve Wagner (born 1967), Olympic field hockey player
- Bobby "Boogaloo" Watts (born 1949), boxer
- Charles Way (born 1972), professional football player
- Maia Weintraub (born 2002), national champion and Olympic foil fencer
- Reece Whitley (born 2000), swimmer and former Sports Illustrated Kid of the Year
- Erik Williams (born 1968), professional football player, Dallas Cowboys
- Ike Williams (1923–1994), boxer and lightweight champion
- Joe Williams (born 1942), former football player
- Stevie Williams (born 1979), professional skateboarder
- Brad Wanamaker (born 1989), professional basketball player, Boston Celtics
- Ned Williamson (1857–1894), professional baseball player
- George Winslow (born 1963), professional football player
- Jimmy Young (1948–2005), boxer

=== Philadelphia native basketball players ===
- Ryan Arcidiacono (born 1994), professional basketball player, New York Knicks
- Paul Arizin (1928–2006), professional basketball player, Camden Bullets and Philadelphia Warriors
- Matt Bahr (born 1956), professional football and soccer player
- Gene Banks (born 1959), professional basketball player, Chicago Bulls and San Antonio Spurs
- Mike Bantom (born 1951), professional basketball player, Indiana Pacers, New York Nets, Philadelphia 76ers, Phoenix Suns, and Seattle Seahawks
- Michael Brooks (1958–2016), professional basketball player
- Joe Bryant (1954–2024), professional basketball player, Houston Rockets, Philadelphia 76ers, and San Diego Clippers
- Kobe Bryant (1978–2020), professional basketball player, Los Angeles Lakers
- Rasual Butler (1979–2018), professional basketball player
- Tony Carr (born 1997), basketball player in the Israeli Premier Basketball League
- Fred Carter (born 1945), NBA
- Wilt Chamberlain (1936–1999), professional basketball player
- Dionte Christmas (born 1986), NBA
- Bryan Cohen (born 1989), American-Israeli, Israel Basketball Premier League
- Mardy Collins (born 1984), NBA
- Dallas Comegys (born 1964), NBA
- Brandon Davies (born 1991), American-born Ugandan professional basketball player
- Mark Davis (born 1960), NBL (Australia) – Adelaide 36ers
- Wayne Ellington (born 1987), NBA
- Julius Erving (born 1950), Philadelphia 76ers 11-time All-Star, 2-time NBA champion, two-time ABA champion, Naismith Memorial Basketball Hall of Fame member
- Tyreke Evans (born 1989), NBA
- D'or Fischer (born 1981), American-Israeli
- Tom Gola (1933–2014), professional basketball player, La Salle University men's basketball head coach, and Philadelphia mayoral candidate
- Eddie Griffin (1982–2007), professional basketball player
- Matt Guokas (born 1944), professional basketball player and coach
- Gerald Henderson Jr. (born 1987), NBA
- Rondae Hollis-Jefferson (born 1995), professional basketball player
- De'Andre Hunter (born 1997), current NBA player for the Atlanta Hawks
- Allen Iverson (born 1975), Philadelphia 76ers professional basketball player, 11-time All-Star, NBA MVP, Naismith Memorial Basketball Hall of Fame member
- Marc Jackson (born 1975), NBA
- Amile Jefferson (born 1993), NBA G League
- Wali Jones (born 1942), NBA
- Bo Kimble (born 1966), NBA
- Red Klotz (1920–2014), American Basketball League basketball player
- Betnijah Laney-Hamilton (born 1993), WNBA
- Howard Lassoff (1955–2013), American-Israeli basketball player
- Ryan Lexer (born 1976), American-Israeli former basketball player, Israeli Basketball Premier League
- Kyle Lowry (born 1986), NBA
- Aaron McKie (born 1972), NBA
- Cuttino Mobley (born 1975), NBA
- Earl Monroe (born 1944), NBA
- Marcus Morris (born 1989), NBA
- Markieff Morris (born 1989), NBA
- Ronald "Flip" Murray (born 1979), NBA
- Jameer Nelson (born 1982), NBA
- Jim O'Brien (born 1952), NBA coach
- Aaron Owens (born 1974), streetball player
- Jack Ramsay (1925–2014), basketball coach, Saint Joseph's College men's team, NBA coach, general manager, television commentator, and Hall of Famer
- Red Rosan (1911–1976), American Basketball League professional basketball player
- Malik Rose (born 1974), NBA
- John Salmons (born 1979), NBA
- Art Spector (1920–1987), professional basketball player
- Dawn Staley (born 1970), WNBA
- Dion Waiters (born 1991), NBA
- Rasheed Wallace (born 1974), NBA
- Hakim Warrick (born 1982), NBA
- Mike Watkins (born 1995), professional basketball player, Antwerp Giants in the BNXT League
- Maurice Watson (born 1993), Maccabi Rishon LeZion of the Israeli Basketball Premier League
- Maalik Wayns (born 1991), NBA
- Alvin Williams (born 1974), NBA
- Khalif Wyatt (born 1991), NBA G League
- Reggie Redding (born 1988) Professional Basketball Player / G League Coach

== Other ==
- Richard Allen (1760–1831), African Methodist Episcopal Church bishop and abolitionist
- Gloria Allred (born 1941), women's rights attorney
- Hart O. Berg (1865–1941), engineer and businessman
- Anna Pierce Hobbs Bixby (c. 1810–c. 1870), midwife, frontier doctor, dentist, herbologist, and scientist who discovered the cause of milk sickness
- Guion Bluford (born 1942), astronaut and first African-American in space
- Frank Erdman Boston (1890–1960), physician
- Stanley Branche (1933–1992), civil rights activist and Philadelphia night club owner
- William E. Carter (1875–1945), a survivor of the RMS Titanic
- Pete Conrad (1930–1999), astronaut, the third man to walk on the Moon with Apollo 12
- Percy Crawford (1902–1960), clergyman and religious broadcaster
- Wilbur Davenport (1920–2003), engineer and scientist
- Steve DeAngelo (born 1958), social activist
- Anthony F. DePalma (1904–2005), orthopedic surgeon and medical school professor
- Katherine Drexel (1858–1955), Roman Catholic saint
- William Duane (1872–1935), a former physicist
- Daniel Faulkner (1955–1981), Philadelphia police officer killed in the line of duty; Mumia Abu-Jamal was convicted of his murder
- Christopher Ferguson (born 1961), astronaut
- Ellen Greenberg (1983–2011), teacher, died either of suicide or homicide
- Jacquelyn Frazier-Lyde (born 1961), Philadelphia municipal court judge and boxer
- Barbara Harris (1930–2020), Anglican Communion bishop
- Paul B. Higginbotham (born 1954), judge, Wisconsin Court of Appeals
- Herman S. Hoffman (1841–1912), Reformed Episcopalian bishop
- Umar Johnson (born 1974), Afrocentrist psychologist and activist
- Ruth Malcomson (1906–1988), Miss America
- James Martin (born 1960), Jesuit priest, writer, and commentator on modern Catholicism
- Seamus McCaffrey (born 1950), justice, Supreme Court of Pennsylvania and presiding judge, "Eagles Court"
- Carol McCain (c. 1938), ex-wife of U.S. presidential candidate John McCain
- Silas Weir Mitchell (1829–1914), physician, scientist, novelist, and poet considered "father of neurology"
- Bawa Muhaiyaddeen (?–1986), Sufi mystic
- Clarence Charles Newcomer (1923–2005), U.S. district judge, U.S. District Court for Eastern District of Pennsylvania
- John Joseph O'Connor (1920–2000), Roman Catholic cardinal and archbishop, Archdiocese of New York
- George A. Palmer (1895–1981), clergyman and religious broadcaster
- David L. Reich (born 1960), academic anesthesiologist, professor, Mount Sinai Hospital president
- Marjorie Rendell (born 1947), judge, U.S. Court of Appeals for the Third Circuit and First Lady of Pennsylvania
- Amber Rose (born 1983), model and actress
- Charles Sanna (1917–2019), Swiss Miss creator, director
- Samuel Gilbert Scott (c. 1813–1841), daredevil
- Lester Shubin (1925–2009), inventor, Kevlar bulletproof vest
- Nancy Spungen (1958–1978), girlfriend of Sex Pistols bassist Sid Vicious
- Marian Thayer (1872–1944), socialite and survivor of the Titanic
- Marion Turner Stubbs (1910–1994), founder of Jack and Jill of America
- Kee Taylor (living), hair stylist, business executive, and YouTuber
- Michael Tollin, film producer
- Floyd W. Tomkins (1850–1932), Church of the Holy Trinity, Philadelphia rector
- Walter E. Williams (1936–2020), economist, commentator, and academic
- Jeremiah Wright (born 1941), pastor, Trinity United Church of Christ
- Joshua Wurman (born 1960), meteorologist and VORTEX2 leader

== See also ==
- List of people from Havertown, Pennsylvania
