= Bagby (surname) =

Bagby is a surname. Notable people with the surname include:

- Andrew Bagby (1973–2001), murdered by his former partner
- Anne Luther Bagby (1859–1942), American Baptist missionary from Texas
- Arthur P. Bagby (1795–1858), governor of Alabama
- Arthur P. Bagby Jr. (1833–1921), American lawyer, editor, and Confederate general
- Benjamin Bagby, American singer and composer
- George Bagby (author) (1906–1985), American author
- George Bagby (politician) (born 1937), American politician
- George William Bagby (1828–1883), American librarian and writer
- Hank Bagby (1922–1993), American jazz musician
- Jim Bagby Jr. (1916–1988), American baseball player
- Jim Bagby Sr. (1889–1954), American baseball player
- John C. Bagby (1819–1896), U.S. Representative from Illinois
- Lamont Bagby (born 1976), American politician
- Larry Bagby (born 1974), American actor and musician
- R. Michael Bagby, Canadian psychologist
- Rachel Bagby (born 1956), American performance artist

== See also ==
- Bagby (disambiguation)
