= Bagby (disambiguation) =

Bagby may refer to:

== People ==
- Bagby (surname)

== Places ==
- Bagby, North Yorkshire, England
- Bagby, California, US
- Independence, Kentucky, US, formerly known as Bagby
- Bagby, Virginia, US
- Bagby Hot Springs, Oregon, US

== Other ==
- Sir Bagby, American comic strip
