= Mary B. Schuenemann =

American painter (1898–1992)

- Born: September 5, 1898; Philadelphia, Pennsylvania, U.S.
- Died: June 15, 1992 (aged 93); Toms River, New Jersey, U.S.
- Education: University of Pennsylvania (BS)
- Known for: Watercolor

Mary B. Schuenemann (September 5, 1898 – June 15, 1992) was an American artist and art teacher, based in Philadelphia, best known as a painter of watercolors.

== Early life and education ==
Mary B. Schuenemann born on September 5, 1898, in Philadelphia, Pennsylvania, the daughter of Paul Schuenemann and Celia Frances Bernard Schuenemann. She received a B.S. degree in education from the University of Pennsylvania; with further studies at the Philadelphia College of Arts (now University of the Arts), the Tyler School of Art, and the Modern School of Painting in Gloucester, Massachusetts, where she studied with Earl Horter, Ernest Thurn, and John Lear.

== Career ==
Schuenemann worked in various media, but is best known as a watercolorist. Her subjects were often in floral, landscape, or still life categories. She received numerous awards from art associations. Schuenemann's art appeared in shows near Philadelphia, including exhibitions by the Philadelphia Art Alliance Red Door Gallery, Woodmere Art Gallery, the Old York Road Art Guild, and The Plastic Club of Philadelphia. Her paintings "From 1922" (a still life) and "Central City" (a cityscape) were featured in the annual watercolor show of the Plastic Club of Philadelphia in 1943. "Indications of Fall" was featured in the club's 1944 exhibition, and her "Three Tables" was featured in the club's 1949 exhibition. Her painting "Pennsylvania Barns" was described in 1965 as being "striking" and "semi-abstract" with "painstaking details".

Schuenemann was also an art educator in the Philadelphia public schools for many years. In 1966 she was an exhibition judge for the American Artists Professional League.

== Personal life ==
Schuenemann lived in Pine Beach, New Jersey after 1959. She died in 1992, at the age of 93 in Toms River, New Jersey.
