= List of people from Havertown, Pennsylvania =

This is a list of people who were born in, lived in, or are closely associated with the city of Havertown, Pennsylvania.

== Athletics ==
- David Abrahams (swimmer), Blind paralympic swimmer
- Edward Burke (basketball), Coach for the Drexel Dragons men's basketball team
- Jerry Crawford, former Major League Baseball umpire
- Joey Crawford, NBA referee
- Shag Crawford, major league umpire and father of Jerry and Joey Crawford
- Mark DiFelice, Former pitcher for the Milwaukee Brewers
- Tim Donaghy, former NBA referee, game fixer
- Jimmy Dykes, baseball player and manager
- Kyle Eckel, NFL player, two-time MVP of Army–Navy Game
- Sinead Farrelly, footballer for the Republic of Ireland national team
- Michael Fitzgerald, racing driver and CEO of Acero Precision
- Randy Grossman, tight end on Pittsburgh Steelers Super Bowl champions
- Brendan Hansen, four-time Olympic medalist
- Steve Joachim, Quarterback for the New York Jets
- Billy King, former GM of NBA's Philadelphia 76ers
- John LeClair, played for NHL's Philadelphia Flyers
- Marcus McElhenney, coxswain, 2008 Beijing Olympics bronze medalist
- John Middleton, Owner of the Philadelphia Phillies
- Ryan Mulhern, former Washington Capitals hockey player
- Shane Ryan (swimmer), Swimmer competing for Ireland
- Jean Shiley-Newhouse, 1932 Olympic gold medalist
- Ron Shumon, Linebacker for the Cincinnati Bengals and San Francisco 49ers
- Durham Smythe, TIght-end for the Baltimore Ravens
- Robin Roberts, Phillies pitcher, Hall of Famer, resided in Manoa
- Amos Strunk, Major League Baseball player for the Philadelphia Athletics and Boston Red Sox
- Cindy Timchal, Lacrosse coach
- Sam Venuto, former running back in National Football League

== Arts and entertainment ==
- Marguerite de Angeli, award-winning children's book author who lived in Manoa in 1930s
- Howard Benson, two-time Grammy nominated producer
- Jan Berenstain, co-creator of the Berenstain Bears, briefly attended Manoa in the late 1920s until the family returned to Philadelphia during the Depression
- Jonny Chops, Drummer and rock musician
- Susanna Dalton, Actress
- Regina Doman, Catholic fiction writer
- John Facenda, Philadelphia newscaster and narrator for NFL Films
- Rick Fisher, two-time Tony Award winner for lighting
- Alex G, singer-songwriter
- Julie Gold, composer & Grammy Song of the Year Award winner, 1991, "From a Distance"
- Ross Katz, film producer
- John Henry Kurtz, Singer-songwriter
- Joe Lunardi, ESPN bracketologist
- Lauren MacMullan, Animation director
- Glen Macnow, Philadelphia radio personality
- Clay Myers (photographer), Photographer and animal welfare advocate
- David Ricketts, composer, guitarist, producer for A&M Records
- Michael Sembello, composer, guitarist, wrote "Maniac" for Flashdance film soundtrack
- Sidney Silodor, Bridge player
- Mike Tollin, film producer and director
- Tom Verica, actor

== Education, politics, and service ==
- Leo Burt, anti-war activist, still at-large; on FBI Most Wanted List in connection with 1970 Sterling Hall bombing at University of Wisconsin campus
- Stephen Freind, Republican representative in Pennsylvania General Assembly
- Frank Gasparro, Chief Engraver of the US Mint
- Theophilus Herter, Episcopal bishop who served in Havertown for 17 years
- Joshua Humphreys, shipbuilder
- Anne E. Kazak, Pediatric psychologist
- Mary Matz, Theologian of the Moravian Church
- Aaron Muderick, innovator and thought leader, company founder
- Greg Vitali, Member of the Pennsylvania House of Representatives
- Mark Yudof, president of University of California
