= Mouse in House =

1979 children's book by Judith Schermer

- Author: Judith Schermer
- Illustrator: Judith Schermer
- Language: English
- Genre: Children's fiction
- Publisher: Houghton Mifflin
- Publication date: April 1979
- Publication place: United States
- ISBN: 0-395-27801-5

Mouse in House is a 1979 children's picture book, which gave Philadelphia artist and illustrator Judith Schermer her only such writing credit. The account of a turn-of-the-20th-century family who wrecks their home trying to get rid of a mouse, it was published by Houghton Mifflin to positive reviews.

== Plot ==
At the turn of the 20th century, a girl named Tess tells her parents of a mouse scurrying near them, leading them to try ridding it away at the expense of wrecking their house and leaving Tess' baby sibling bawling. When Tess gets their cat to take care of the mouse, their dog is awakened, and then "chases the cat, who chases the mouse—remindful of 'The House That Jack Built.'"

== Background ==
Mouse in House was the first and only book to be written by Judith Schermer, an artist and illustrator hailing from Philadelphia. At the time of its publication, Schermer had spent the past six years of her career on other clients' titles. The story's rhyming text, using a vocabulary of only 20 words, is expressed exclusively in speech balloons.

== Reception ==
Reviews for Mouse in House were highly positive. Eleanor Eby of The Philadelphia Inquirer declared it "a most commendable book"; the School Library Journal called it "A pleasant change from the standard 'see and read' type production"; and the Sioux City Journal said, "Very simple text and gay illustrations will encourage the reluctant reader." The religious Marriage & Family Living magazine shared similar thoughts: "Very young children will enjoy repeating the brief text as they enjoy looking at the lively pictures."

The International Reading Association's The Reading Teacher remarked that Tess' resourcefulness "should make girl readers feel rather good about themselves." As the Language Arts journal pointed out, "Children call this a silly book and mean the remark to be complimentary." The latter two publications took note of Schermer's cartoon-style art.
