= Crazy Aaronʼs =

American toy company

- Native name: Crazy Aaron’s
- Type: Private
- Industry: Toy
- Founded: 1998
- Founder: Aaron Muderick
- Headquarters: Norristown, PA, United States
- Area served: Worldwide
- Parent: Goliath Games
- Website: crazyaarons.com

Crazy Aaronʼs is a private American toy company best known for manufacturing Thinking Putty and a range of other toy compounds. Founded in 1998 by Aaron Muderick, the company operates from its headquarters in Norristown, Pennsylvania, and serves a global market.

== History ==
Crazy Aaron's was founded in 1998 by Aaron Muderick, a former software engineer who began experimenting with putty as a creative pastime. Initially producing small batches of putty by hand, Muderick transformed his hobby into a full-scale business, eventually launching Thinking Putty as the company's flagship product.

In 2018, the company relocated to a larger facility that houses its global headquarters, manufacturing plant, and offices in Norristown, Pennsylvania. A year later, in 2019, Crazy Aaron's expanded its product portfolio by acquiring Land of Dough, a brand offering eco-friendly play dough made from sustainable materials.

In 2023, to commemorate its 25th anniversary, Crazy Aaron's introduced a new product line called Slime Charmers, featuring compounds with various textures. The following year, in 2024, the company announced a strategic partnership with Kroeger Canada to strengthen its presence in the Canadian market.

In 2026 Crazy Aaron's was bought by multinational toy and game manufacturer Goliath Games.

== Reception ==
Crazy Aaron's products were initially designed as stress-relief tools for adults. Over time, the brand gained popularity as a children's toy and became widely used in sensory therapy. The tactile and interactive qualities of Thinking Putty have contributed to its appeal among both educators and therapists.

In 2025, Crazy Aaron's collaborated with several U.S. elementary schools to integrate Thinking Putty into classroom-based STEM learning activities focused on tactile engagement and creativity.

== Awards and recognition ==
Crazy Aaron's has received several industry accolades for innovation and educational value, including:

- Creative Play of the Year (2022)
- Mom's Choice Awards (2024)
