= Stepdog =

1983 children's book by Marlene F. Shyer

- Author: Marlene Fanta Shyer
- Illustrator: Judith Schermer
- Language: English
- Genre: Children's fiction
- Published: October 1983
- Publisher: Scribner
- Publication place: United States
- Pages: 32 (unpaged)
- ISBN: 0-684-17998-9

Stepdog is a 1983 children's book by Marlene Fanta Shyer, with illustrations by Judith Schermer. Shyer's story revolves around a girl's excitement over her father's new wife, and the jealousy the latter's pet dog develops after they wed. It received positive reviews, and several publications throughout the 1980s discussed its portrayal of stepfamily dynamics.

== Plot ==
A girl named Terry (Note: Referred to as a boy in Monson 1985.) is excited that her father will soon marry a new wife, Marilyn, as they all move to a summer lakeshore home. The father is confident his daughter will enjoy the company of Marilyn's pet dog, Hoover, who can "shake hands, run fast, and wag his tail at sixty miles an hour". But Hoover develops strong apathy over the thought of the marriage, leading to his jealousy and misbehavior soon after. Through consoling him and dreaming of herself as a dog, Terry comes to terms with the dog's feelings. On a later morning, she wakes up to the sight of various shoes the jealous canine collected from the family for several days, and the two thank each other in the process. The story ends with a family lake race where Terry wins and Hoover is runner-up, and Terry's confession that she likes her "stepdog" after all.

== Background ==
Philadelphia artist Judith Schermer's pen-and-ink illustrations for Stepdog marked the second and final appearance of her work in children's literature (despite having several forthcoming projects at the time); from that point onward, she continued her career as a painter.

== Thematic analysis ==
The title Stepdog, in the view of Marilyn Coleman and Lawrence H. Ganong, "is a metaphor for [being] a stepchild." According to Joe Bearden in the School Library Journal, "Poor Hoover's plight paints a sympathetic picture of a dog suffering human-like emotional disorientation due to the change in his family." Amid Terry's delight about her dad's remarriage, readers relating to her character arc "may see some of their own adjustment issues in Hoover's troubles" (Dreyer 1989).

== Reception ==
Stepdog received positive reviews. As the SLJ's Bearden noted, "The resolution is both believable and happy and the telling is warm and humorous". The Bulletin of the Center for Children's Books gave it an "R" (Recommended) grade. "The story is told in a light style," the journal's staff said, "[and the] pictures are of adequate quality, not technically or aestetically polished, but realistic and animated." Most enthusiastic was the Young Children journal: "[A marvelous] twist on the 'boy meets dog' theme [where] Hoover's personality radiates...he will warm the hearts of anyone who reads it!"

Critical assessment continued during the rest of the 1980s. Coleman and Ganong called the book "funny, well-written...[and] very upbeat", while the American Guidance Society publication The Bookfinder remarked, "This book should work well to initiate discussions of...remarriage [and stepfamily]." Dianne L. Monson stated that "The text is a bit fragmented at the start, but it reads more clearly as the story progresses."
