= Bagby, Virginia =

Unincorporated community in Virginia, United States

- Unincorporated community
- Location within Virginia Location within the United States
- Coordinates: 37°55′34″N 77°13′53″W
- Country: United States
- State: Virginia
- County: Caroline
- Elevation: 194 ft (59 m)
- Time zone: UTC-5 (Eastern (EST))
  - Summer (DST): UTC-4 (EDT)
- Area code: 804
- GNIS feature ID: 1477090

Bagby is an unincorporated community in Caroline County, in the U.S. state of Virginia.
