= Mademoiselle Fifi (dancer) =

Mary Elizabeth Dawson, née Elizabeth Buzby and better known as Mademoiselle Fifi (February 7, 1890 – July 21, 1982), was a dancer. In Rowland Barber's 1960 novel The Night They Raided Minsky's, this "Mademoiselle Fifi" is credited with an onstage performance at Winter Garden Theatre on the night of April 20, 1925.

== Early life ==
A Philadelphia native, her given name was Mary Dawson. According to Barber's novel, her father was "a Quaker and a Cop" and her mother was an ex-Lutheran Quaker convert (although a 21st-century work of "sizzle history" characterizes her mother instead as "a devout Catholic").

== Fictional performance ==
According to Barber's novel, on the evening of April 20, Mademoiselle Fifi wore a skintight black net from her toe tips to her bra. As the orchestra played a medley of Puccini, ragtime music, and Offenbach's Gaîté Parisienne, she pulled one of her straps from her shoulder and then removed her bra. Mademoiselle Fifi concluded her strip act that evening bare-chested. She was later arrested by John Sumner, the secretary of the New York Society for the Suppression of Vice under the action of public obscenity. Fond of classic subjects, Mademoiselle Fifi performed The Dance of the September Morn. She is also credited with an oriental shimmy with a live garter snake. However, these accounts, based only on Barber's novel (a work of fiction), are likely apocryphal. No evidence exists in local newspapers, police files, or NYSSV archives of a raid on that date, and Dawson herself denied ever stripping on stage.
