= Howard Merrill Shelley =

American dramatist

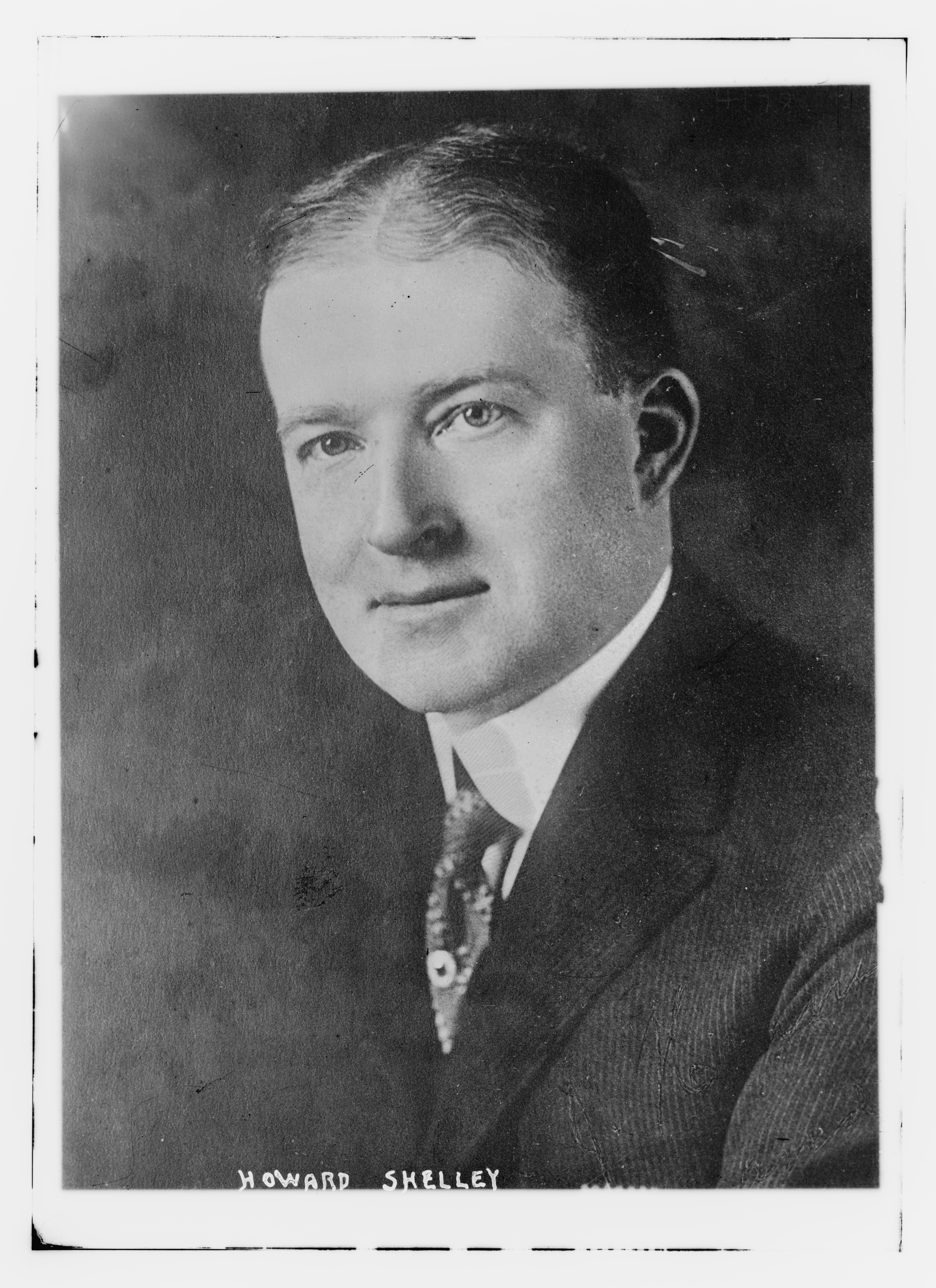
Howard Merrill Shelley

Howard Merrill Shelley (1879-1956) was a playwright and theatrical press agent.

== Biography ==
Shelley was born in Philadelphia and attended Villanova College, now referred to as Villanova University. Villanova bestowed Shelley with an honorary Master of Arts Degree in 1956.

=== Lineage ===
Shelley's family lineage contained a number of notable figures. Howard's mother, Sophia Rittenhouse Shelley, is directly descended from the scientist and astronomer, David Rittenhouse. Howard's grandmother, Amanda McClellan is related by marriage to Benjamin Franklin and is directly related to the Civil War general, George Brinton McClellan. George Brinton McClellan the son of Dr. George McClellan and the grandson of James McClellan who was the son of General Samuel McClellan of the Revolutionary War. Samuel married Rachel Abbe, a direct descendant of Governor William Bradford of Plymouth, Massachusetts. Howard also had a second cousin named Kate Shelley who as a young girl risked her own life to save hundreds of lives by averting a potential train accident and became a household name in her own time. Also related to Shelley on his grandmother's side were John Test, who served as a sheriff under William Penn, and William Roberts, one of the original settlers of Merion, Pennsylvania.

=== Works ===
Shelley drew from his family history and wrote a play based on it in 1914 called The Family Tree. Shelley took inspiration from the genealogical craze that was sweeping Philadelphia and other major cities in order to write the satirical work. Prior to The Family Tree Shelley co-wrote a popular musical called The Beauty Doctor in 1904. An article in the Geneva Daily Times described this production as a piece “based on the beauty culture craze, which is handled in a broadly humorous way and is said to afford ample opportunity for hearty fun”.

After writing satires for the stage, Howard went on to become a theatrical press agent. He wrote about society under the name Barclay Beekman for the New York Daily Mirror. Shelley was also employed by stars of the stage, including Lillian Russell, an actress and singer, and Luisa Tetrazzini, an Italian opera soprano, as well as Mary Garden, an opera star, and the Hammerstein family.

Howard Shelley died on December 11, 1956, after an illness of two years. He was seventy-seven.
