= Charles Sanna =

American inventor (1917–2019)

- Born: November 9, 1917; Philadelphia
- Died: March 13, 2019 (aged 101); Madison, Wisconsin
- Education: University of Wisconsin–Madison
- Occupation: Inventor
- Known for: Swiss Miss
- Children: 5
- Parent(s): Anthony Sanna; Anna Romona

Charles Sanna (November 9, 1917, Philadelphia – March 13, 2019, Madison, Wisconsin) was an American inventor, best known for inventing Swiss Miss instant hot chocolate.
