= George Dashnau =

American advertising executive

- Born: October 12, 1923
- Died: February 9, 2001 (aged 77); Willingboro Township, New Jersey, U.S.
- Occupations: Advertising executive, business owner
- Years active: 1970s
- Known for: Human skull mail order delivery service

George Dashnau (October 12, 1923 – February 9, 2001) was an advertising executive in Philadelphia who started the first mail order delivery service that supplied human skulls. He was 55 years old when he started the business.

== Business ==
Dashnau sold human skulls for $100 each in the 1970s, which he claimed to be from a medical supply firm that wanted to be nameless. The business was based out of his post office box under the trade name The Skull Man. He started the business because he wanted to become rich, a dream that he had had for many years. He believed the idea came from years of reading science fiction. Dashnau said that he tried to think of the skulls as old bones and not as people. In the hope that human skulls would become novelty items, he did not market them for medical purposes but as decorations for home and work. Roger Simmons, of the Chicago Sun-Times, asked Dashnau why he would not reveal where the skulls were from. Dashnau said that he would not reveal where they came from because he did not want imitators using the same supplies. Dashnau said that The Wall Street Journal refused to run his ad.

== Human skulls ==
Each skull was treated to prevent decalcification. The cranium was made so that people could view the lower brain cavity and the lower jaw was fastened with springs which allowed someone to open and close the mouth. Dashnau had no idea how old the skulls were or where they came from, but that people bought them as pieces for conversation. Two of Dashnau's hopes were that business executives would buy a skull as an unusual desk ornament and to be able to expand his offered merchandise, including full human skeletons for $500 each.

== Death ==
Dashnau died on February 9, 2001, due to a stroke in Willingboro Township, New Jersey. He was buried at Monument Cemetery in Beverly, New Jersey, on February 14, 2001.

== Bibliography ==
In 1979 and again in a 1981 edition, Dashnau had an entry in the book Famous Americans You Never Knew Existed. In 1990, Dashnau had an entry in the book Best Of Gravestone Humor.
