= Earl Horter =

American painter

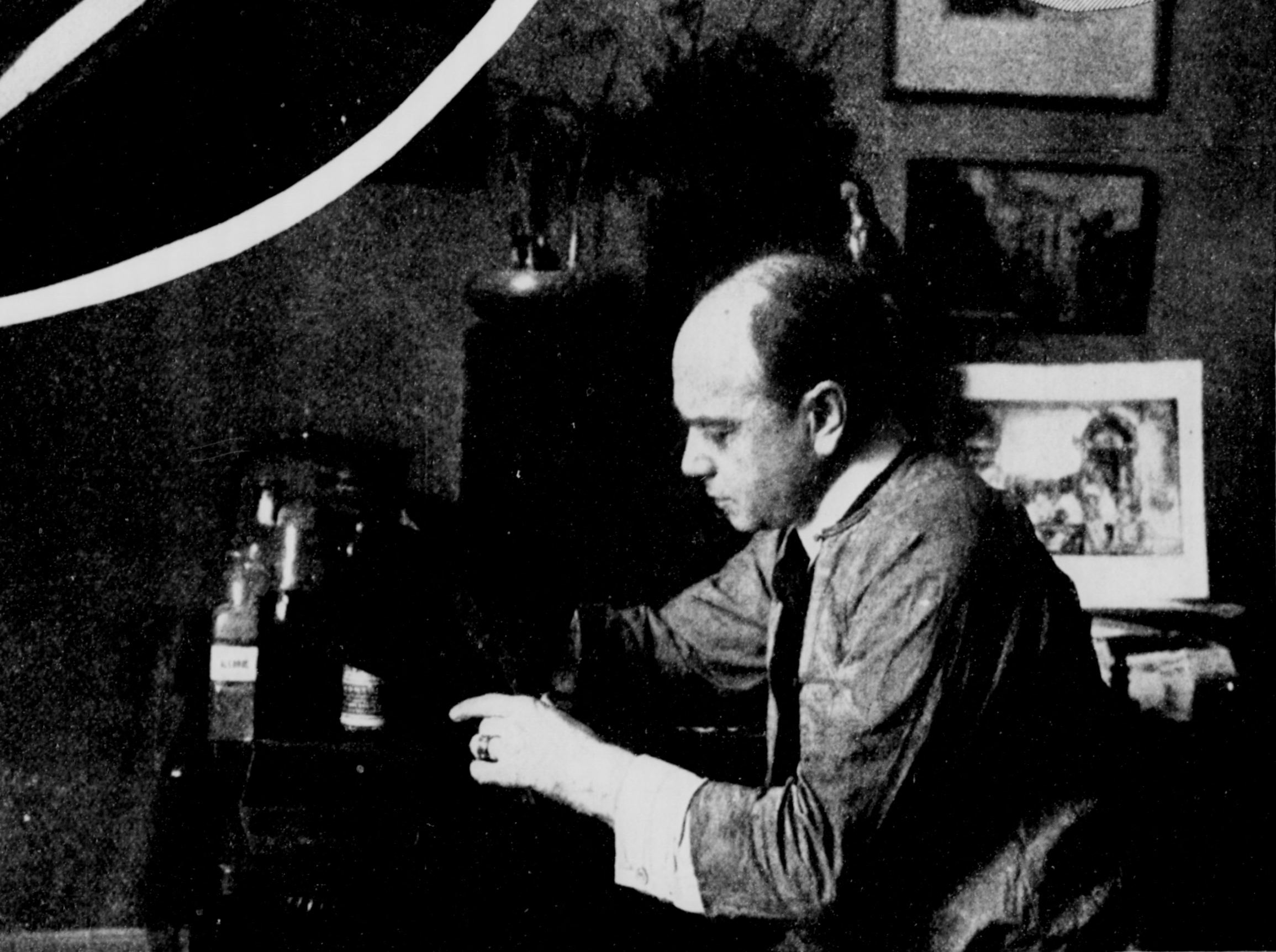
- Earl Horter, date unknown
- Born: December 8, 1880; Philadelphia
- Died: March 29, 1940 (aged 59); Chestnut Hill, Philadelphia
- Style: Cubism, Abstract

Earl Horter (December 8, 1880 – March 29, 1940) was an American painter, illustrator, printmaker, teacher and art collector. He was instrumental in introducing modern art to Philadelphia as both an artist and collector of Cubist and abstract art. During the 1920s, he had one of the largest collections of modern art in the United States, and he was among the most prominent etchers of his generation.

== Early years and education ==
Earl Blumner Horter was born on December 8, 1880, to Jacob and Jeanette Horter (Blumner was her maiden name), a working-class family in Philadelphia. A student at the Germantown Boys Combined Grammar School in the 1890s, he began drawing as a young boy. As a youth, he was an apprentice to a commercial engraver and found a job designing bank notes. He was also said to be a draftsman who engraved stock certificates for the John Wanamaker department store. At age 19, he was living with his widowed mother and his occupation was listed as landscape artist on the 1900 U.S. Census. Over the years, he signed his name as “Earl” and “Earle.”

== Years as an artist, 1900–1919 ==
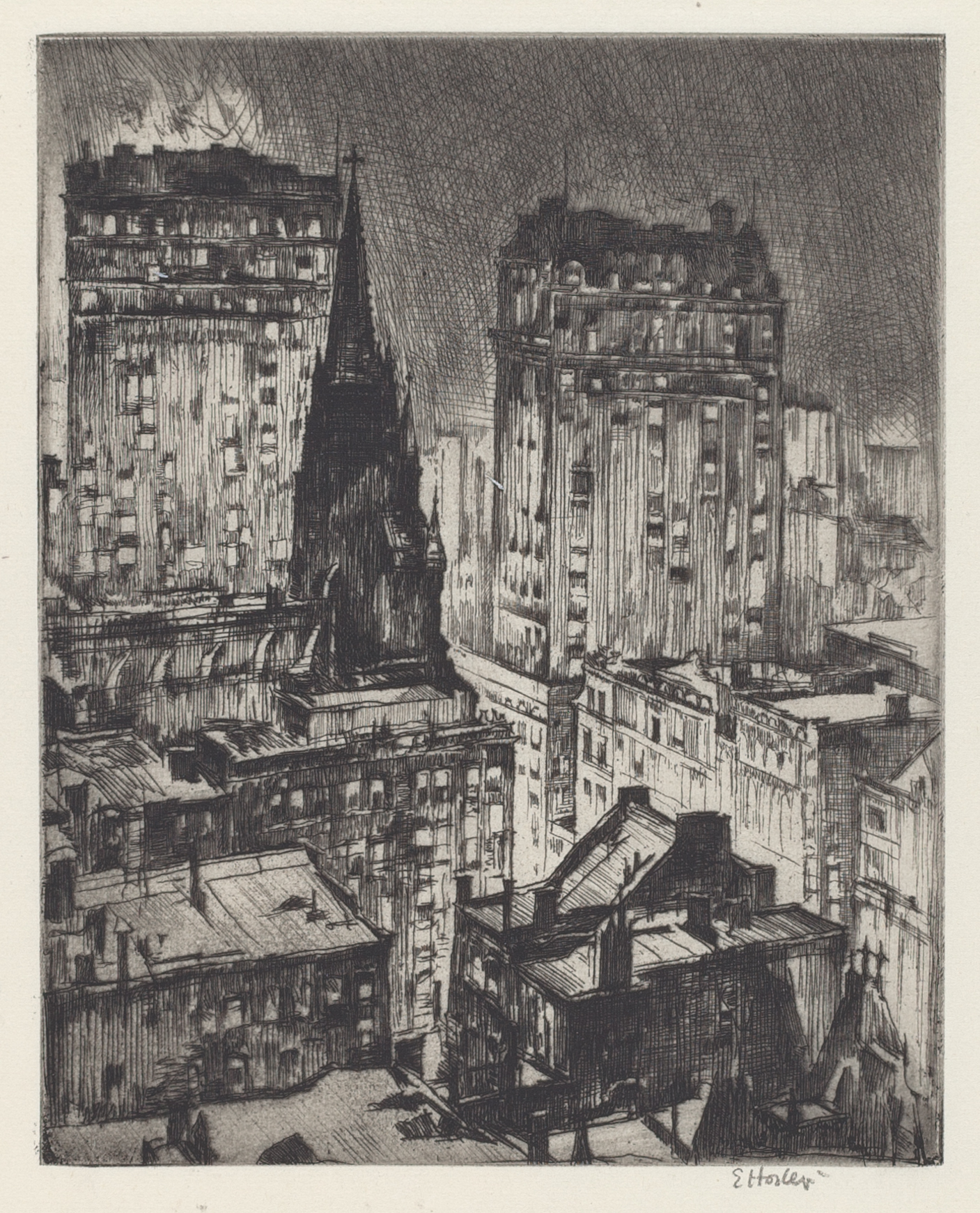
The Dark Tower, 1919

Horter was a self-taught artist who never attended art school. He studied etching with George Senseney, the first color etcher in the United States who taught at the Art Students League in New York. Horter was enamored with the old-master drawings he saw in museums and galleries, especially the architectural work of Italian artists Vittore Carpaccio, Giovanni Battista Piranesi and French artist Charles Meryon. He felt that he could render the changes in the architectural landscapes of Philadelphia and New York in the same dramatic way as they had done with Old World structures. He wanted to “depict this tremendous epic of new cities emerging full grown out of the chrysalis of the old.”

He was prolific during the 1920s and 1930s, producing etchings, aquatints, watercolors, oil paintings, lithographs and drawings. He was most noted for his etchings of architectural structures and city-street scenes in Philadelphia, New York and European cities. He exhibited widely in Philadelphia, New York, Chicago and other cities in shows where etchings were predominant. He was often cited in newspaper articles - even today - as one of the most important etchers in American art history. His style was likened to his contemporary Joseph Pennell as well as James Abbott Whistler.

Early on, he worked as a both a paid and freelance commercial artist. In 1903, he married the first of four wives and moved to New York. He was hired by the Calkins and Holden advertising agency based on his drafting skills. Horter worked at several other agencies, including Carlton Illustrators and the Cheltenham Advertising Agency. His first etching dates to 1908.

In 1911, the New York Edison Company commissioned Horter and two other artists, including Pennell, to produce illustrations for its book “Glimpses of New York: An Illustrated Handbook of the City.” In 1914, he created an automobile ad for the Packard ’38’ Phaeton car and was included in the “Yearbook of American Etching. As a member of the Association of American Etchers, he was represented in its exhibition in 1914 and the following year.

In 1911, he was identified in the “Annual of the Society of Illustrators” as one of the new wave of artists. He had become a member of the society the year before. He exhibited in a society show in 1913 with an etching of Pittsburgh smelters. Also that year, the Brown Robertson Company, which published prints and art reproductions, included him in a show of etchings of New York streets.

He was one of the 25 organizers of the New York Society of Illustrators in 1913 and was chosen as its secretary. He participated in its 1914 exhibition. In 1917, he helped form the Painter-Gravers of America, which promised to show nothing that had been shown before. Other members were Childe Hassam, George Bellows and John Sloan.

Horter won a silver award in etchings and engravings at the Panama-Pacific International Exposition in San Francisco in 1915.

He exhibited in 1915 at Keppel Galleries as part of a group exhibit. He had the first one-man show of his drawings and etchings in 1916 at Keppel. A writer for the New York Times extolled his watercolors but found his etchings uneven. Another writer hailed his works with a “Bravo."

Horter participated for the first time in the Pennsylvania Academy of the Fine Arts annual show in 1915 with the etching “Madison Square.” In 1916, he participated in the first exhibit by the newly formed Brooklyn Society of Etchers and the New York Society of Etchers. In 1919, the New York Tribune reproduced his etchings that had run in Century magazine of buildings in Old Philadelphia. Etchings by Horter and Pennell were used as illustrations in the 1915 book “Romantic America” by Robert Haven Shauffler.

Around 1917, Horter returned to Philadelphia and began working for N.W. Ayer and Son, one of the largest advertising agencies in Philadelphia and the country. He rose to become its art director.

== Years as an artist, 1920–1929 ==
Horter was making a good income from his commercial artwork, and he was very active as an artist and exhibitor. In separation proceedings in 1915, his second wife Elin noted that his annual income was $7,000 to $10,000. In the 1930 Census, he noted that his home in Philadelphia was worth $25,000.

In 1923, the Joseph Dixon Crucible Company of New Jersey commissioned him to travel to Europe to sketch and draw whatever pleased him. The only requirement was that he use its Eldorado pencil. Horter booked a ship to Europe, bound for France, Italy, Spain, Germany, Greece and Portugal. He returned to the United States the next year. Horter created 55 drawings for Dixon ads over several years.

His painting “Toledo” came out of that trip, and demonstrated his leanings toward Cubism. He produced several paintings of the Spanish city in oils and watercolors. “Toledo” was shown in the annual exhibit of the Pennsylvania Academy of the Fine Arts in 1925.

His advertising work for Ayer was included in an exhibit by the company in 1923. The Huntington Library, Art Museum and Botanical Gardens in San Marino, CA, has copies of five flyers from his original pencil drawings for Crucible. They include scenes from Philadelphia, Italy and France.

Horter left Ayer around 1923, and became a freelance commercial artist while he continued his etching, painting and exhibiting.

He was represented often in the Pennsylvania Academy of the Fine Arts annual shows as an exhibitor and judge. In 1921, he was a judge for the watercolor competition and showed 10 pieces, including six nudes and another titled “Negro Head.” The academy bought his work “The Thames Bridge II” at the 1924 annual competition. Horter won the Philadelphia Water Color Club Prize in the 1936 annual. The academy bought his painting “Autumn in Rockport” that year. He exhibited with the Print Club of Philadelphia in 1922 and in 1928, took part in an exhibit of illustrations in Washington, DC, sponsored by the U.S. Chamber of Commerce.

Horter was a member of “The Thirty-One,” a group of Philadelphia artists who organized a non-juried show of paintings from the “modern school” in 1923. The group wanted to show paintings that were original, progressive and beautiful. Among the members was his good friend Arthur B. Carles. Horter was also represented with paintings in "Thirty" showings in 1929 and 1932. Artist Franklin Watkins described The Thirty One endeavors as the first awakening to modernism and rejection of the traditionalism of the Pennsylvania academy.

Horter's foray into modernism was influenced by that group, his trips to Europe and the encouragement of Carl Zigrosser, curator at the Museum of Modern Art. He began painting in the modern style and collecting its major European artists. Other influencers were Carles and Henry McCarter, also a member of The Thirty-One, and collector Albert C. Barnes.

In 1929, he won first place in an advertising art show at the Philadelphia Sketch Club in the “illustration for full color reproduction” category.

== Years as an artist, 1930–1939 ==
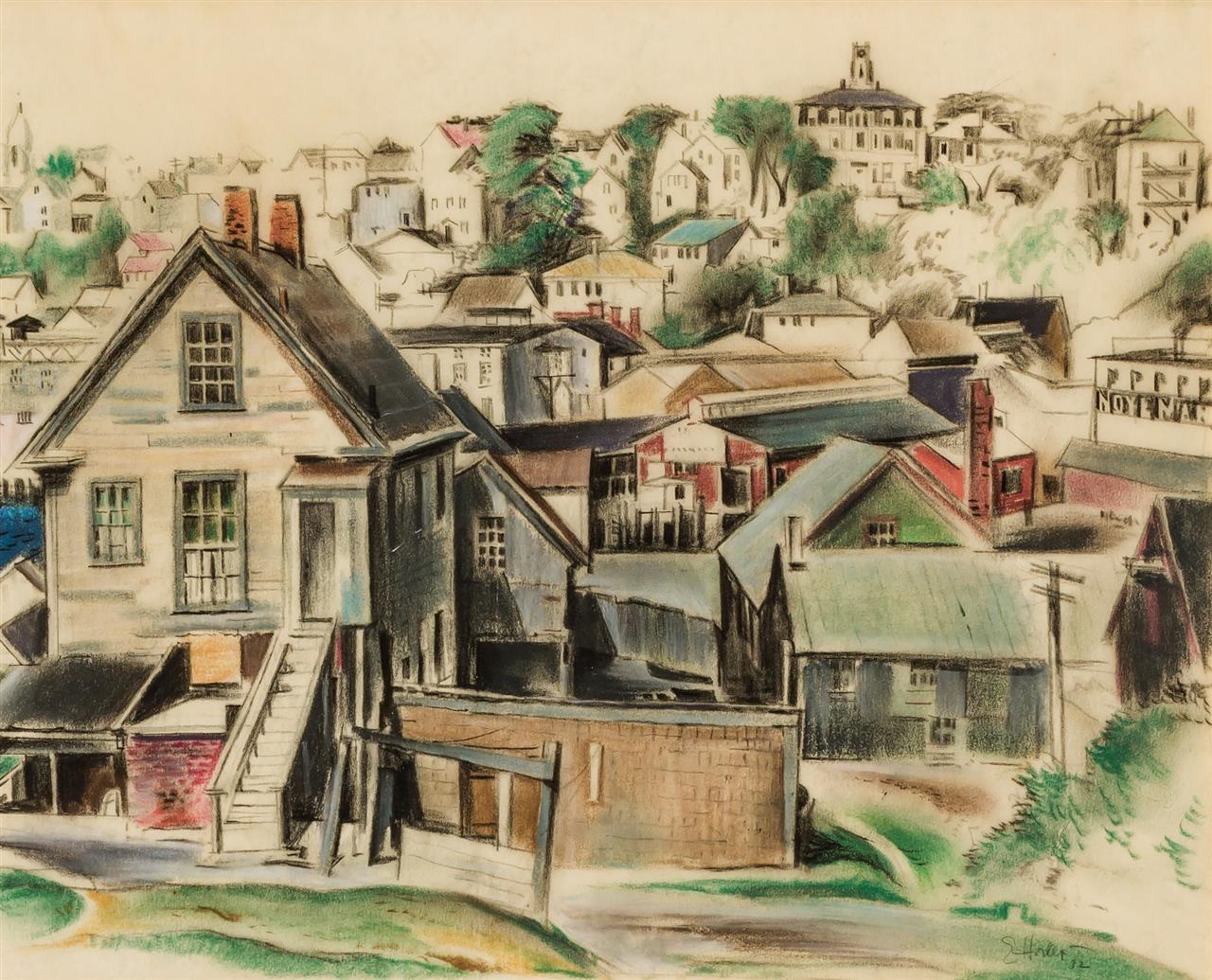
Gloucester, Massachusetts by Earl Horter, 1932, pastel on vellum

Like the 1920s, this was a busy decade for Horter, who was “here, there and everywhere these days, lecturing or exhibiting or winning prizes,” one newspaper writer noted. It was also a difficult time for him personally. The Depression had taken hold of the country, and his commercial work dried up, alimony payments became due and his expensive living strained his finances.

By the early 1930s, he was painting in aquatint with its soft tones evoking moods. In 1930, he wrote a book titled “Picasso, Matisse, Derain, Modigliani” that was part of a Museum of Modern Art exhibit a year later.

Some of his gallery and museum exhibits were:

- C. Philip Boyer gallery (Philadelphia), 1930
- Memorial Art Gallery (Rochester (NY), 1932
- Whitney Museum of American Art, 1932
- Little Gallery of Contemporary Art (Philadelphia), 1932
- Brooklyn Museum, 1933
- Smithsonian Institution, 1932
- Pennsylvania Academy of Fine Arts, 1933
- School Art League Alumni Association (Philadelphia), 1932
- Wilmington Society of Fine Arts (Delaware), 1935
- Philadelphia Art Alliance, 1937, 1939
- Philadelphia Water Color Club, 1939
- Delaware Water Color Show (also a judge), 1939

In 1932, he participated in the Art Institute of Chicago's international watercolor show in June; his work was said to have a strong French point of view. In the first National Exhibition of Etching and Engraving at the Art Institute in April, his aquatint “Junk Shop” won third place. It also took home the Print Club of Philadelphia's Charles M. Lea Prize for best print in May, only the second time in its history that the prize was awarded to a Philadelphian.

In December of that year, his etching “Light and Shadows” won the Charles M. Lea Prize for best etching in the First National Exhibition of Prints at the Print Club. In 1934, his watercolor “Chinatown, Night” won a $400 prize in an exhibit at the Art Institute.

In 1933, Crillon Galleries in Philadelphia held a one-man show of 26 nudes in watercolor, pastel and drawing in various poses. “There is nothing left to say about the female nude which Mr. Horter has not said,” stated a newspaper writer. “His exhibit is remarkably comprehensive and again reveals to how many artistic devices he can turn his facile and gifted hands.”

In 1936, he was among 20 painters and three sculptors to represent Pennsylvania in the National Exhibition of American Art at the Rockefeller Center. The Whitney Museum of American Art acquired one of his watercolors at its Second Biennial Exhibition of Contemporary American Watercolors and Pastels. His aquatint “Rainy Night, Chinatown” was selected by the Museum of Modern Art for an exhibit titled “Three Centuries of American Art” that was shown in Paris in 1936.

In 1938, his aquatint “Along the Harlem,” which was created with African American artist Allan Freelon, won the Charles M. Lea Prize of $100 in an exhibit at the Print Club. Freelon studied with Horter in the late 1920s.

Horter was among a group of artists who produced etchings on the life of George Washington sponsored by the George Washington Memorial Association. A portfolio of 20 etchings was presented to the White House in 1932. In the mid-1930s, he was commissioned by the American Art Foundation to create patriotic etchings. His was “Washington at Braddock's Defeat.”

In 1939, he was commissioned by the New Jersey Council to create reproductions of etchings of historic houses and buildings in the state. The reproductions were published weekly in local newspapers. Another of his commissions was a promotional poster for the city of Ridgewood, NJ, (1916). A versatile artist, Horter also made portraits, including one of President Lincoln as a young man without a beard and another of Dr. George H. Meeker, dean of the Graduate School of Medicine at the University of Pennsylvania (1933).

Horter also produced still lifes, some of which are in museum collections.

== His art collection ==
During the 1920s, Horter amassed an impressive collection of modern art, African sculptures and Native American art. Over the years, he loaned some to museum exhibitions. Even his friend Carles - as well as Leon Kelly - used the collection as inspiration for his own modernistic works.

Horter purchased his first painting in 1913 at the famous New York Armory show of modern art, which introduced Cubism and abstract art to America. He purchased 13 lithographs by French artist Édouard Vuillard. Horter bought his first Picasso for $180, according to Carles. Horter made his purchases with the income he earned as a commercial artist.

"I work so hard, and when I'm done I look at the work of some great master - he seems so universal like a wonderful thunderstorm - or like looking over the edge of Vesuvius - and I the little firecracker that goes off with a hiss - thank God I can detect greatness here and there and worship it," he stated.

Horter filled his Delancey Street home with the works of Pablo Picasso, Constantin Brancusi, Marcel Duchamp, Georges Braque, Henri Matisse, Amedeo Modigliani and Juan Gris. He also purchased works by Charles Sheeler, an American precisionist painter, as well Henri de Toulouse-Lautrec, Maurice Denis, Käthe Kollwitz and Carles. At one point, his collection included 30 Cubist works by Picasso and Braque, two paintings by Gris and one by Matisse, and four sculptures by Brancusi.

He owned Duchamp's “Nude Descending a Staircase, No. 1” (1911), Picasso's “Portrait of Daniel Henry Kahnweiler” (1910) and Sheeler's “Church Street El” (1920).

Early in his collecting, he had about 80 African sculptures. He began collecting them in 1925 with the encouragement of Barnes, French art dealer Paul Guillaume and American photographer Alfred Stieglitz. Horter's collection contained a Guro mask from the Ivory Coast, Songye male figurines from Congo and a Kota reliquary guardian figure from Gabon.

In 1934, the Philadelphia Museum of Art held a major exhibit of oils, watercolors and sculptures from his collection. There were eight Braque abstracts and still lifes, Duchamp's “Nude,” six Picassos, a Raoul Dufy, Matisse's “Portrait of a Lady,” Gris’ “Abstraction” and Giorgio de Chirico's “Warriors.”

Horter loaned “The Italian Woman” (1915) to the Museum of Modern Art for a Matisse exhibit in 1931. His book was included in the catalog's bibliography. In 1935, he loaned African sculptures in wood to the museum. In 1939, he loaned the museum a piece by Sheeler for its one-man show on the artist. The Arts Club of Chicago borrowed some works for a 1934 exhibition. In 1935, he loaned works to the Philadelphia Museum of Art for a show on abstracts. In 1936, Horter loaned works to the Memorial Art Gallery in Rochester, NY, for an exhibit on African art.

During an exhibit at the Philadelphia Art Alliance in 1936, someone removed a Picasso abstract nude from the frame on a wall. Horter had donated the etching, which he valued at $500 and was insured.

The Depression hit Horter hard, and he was forced to sell many of his famous works. He tried selling the entire collection to the Philadelphia Museum of Art, but its trustees were not interested. He sold the paintings to private individuals over the years, and many of the works eventually ended up in museum collections. He began focusing on increasing his holdings of Native American artifacts. By the late 1930s, he had accumulated about 1,500 pieces of Native American artifacts, including war bonnets and weapons.

In 1969, his widow Helen showed her collection at the Philadelphia Museum of Art for the first time since the 1934 Horter exhibit: three paintings by Sheeler, four by Carles, several by Braque and Picasso, along with works by Horter.

In 1999, the Philadelphia Museum of Art re-assembled most of the collection, borrowing them from museums for the exhibit "Mad for Modernism." They had been dispersed to such institutions as the Philadelphia Museum of Art, the Art Institute of Chicago, the Cleveland Museum of Art, the Solomon R. Guggenheim Museum, the Museum of Modern Art, the National Museum of the American Indian, and 40 other public and private collections. The Philadelphia Sketch Club, which he joined in 1919, presented a complementary show at the time.

== Years as a teacher ==
Horter offered classes privately and at public institutions. He taught evening classes at the Graphic Sketch Club (now the Fleischer Art Center) in Philadelphia starting in 1930. Dox Thrash took printmaking classes from him and was one of his favorite students. Horter was just beginning to learn aquatint himself in the early 1930s. Horter and Thrash participated in an annual exhibition of prints by Philadelphia artists in 1939, where Horter won Honorable Mention for his aquatint "Alleyway, Philadelphia." Thrash was represented with the carborundum print "Repose." Thrash was inspired to co-develop the carborundum-print process after hearing Horter mention that no significant improvement had been made in printmaking in nearly a century.

Horter also taught at the Philadelphia Museum School of Industrial Art (now the University of the Arts), Stella Elkins Tyler School of Art at Temple University (now Tyler School of Art) and the University of Pennsylvania night school. During the summers, he taught at an art colony in Rockport, MA. He also gave private art classes in homes.

A month after arriving at the museum school in 1933, he and another faculty member won the two prizes in the Philadelphia Watercolor Club exhibition. It was the first time the prizes had been awarded to two instructors at the school. He won $200 for best group picture.

== Marriages and personal life ==
In addition to having a home in Philadelphia, Horter also had a place in Harvey Cedars, NJ. A small man in stature, he often wore the same suit, drove big cars, and loved hats, sailing and the company of women.

He married four times - in 1903 to Edith, with whom he moved to New York. The next wife was Swedish; her name was Elin, whom he married in 1909. Their separation hearing in 1915 made newspaper headlines. In court, she accused him of reneging on a loan from her to pay alimony to his first wife. She also accused him of having an affair. Horter denied it (in his marriage certificate to his fourth wife Elizabeth, he listed the cause of his previous divorce as adultery; he didn't mention who was the adulterer). He said he was leaving Elin because she, like him, had expensive tastes in such things as art and furniture.

His next two wives, Helen and Elizabeth, were also artists. Horter was with Helen when he lost the Delancey Street home in a sheriff's sale in 1937. He married Elizabeth in 1938.

== Death and aftermath ==
Horter died of a heart attack on March 29, 1940, at his home "Beech Knoll" in the Chestnut Hill neighborhood of Philadelphia. (In 1939, he had mailed a Christmas card with an aquatint of the front of the house.) The night before, he had been at a banquet and symposium for a show at the Philadelphia Art Alliance. He had one son, Donald, with his second wife Elin.

A month later, the Pennsylvania Academy of the Fine Arts included in an exhibit a flora study said to have been completed a few days before he died. The Print Club displayed several of his works in an exhibit as a memorial.

In November, the Art Alliance mounted a solo exhibition, with each of its galleries displaying different aspects of his works, from watercolors and oils to etchings to lithographs to commercial art. Woodmere held its own memorial show in 1941.

The Philadelphia Sketch Club also held an exhibit, and Horter's “gang,” the male students he taught to etch, produced a brochure to accompany it. The brochure recounted the origin of the group: While having lunch one day, his students, who gave him the pet name “Bill,” kidded him about how easy it must be to etch. It was so easy, he agreed, that he could teach it to “this crowd of morons.”

Horter's imprint was lasting. Every decade after his death, his works were shown often in museums and galleries. Today, very few people know his name. At an auction house in 2010, a house-cleanout man dumped a milk crate full of Horter etchings under a table for the auction house to sort. The man did not recognize his name. The auctioneer did.

== Selected collections ==
- Philadelphia Museum of Art
- Pennsylvania Academy of the Fine Arts
- Metropolitan Museum of Art
- Library of Congress
- Free Library of Philadelphia
- Fine Arts Museums of San Francisco
- National Gallery of Art
- Whitney Museum of American Art
- Amon Carter Museum of American Art
- Huntington Library, Art Museum and Botanical Garden
- Worcester Art Museum
- Carnegie Museum of Art
- Smithsonian American Art Museum
- Nelson-Atkins Museum of Art
- Brooklyn Museum
- Seattle Art Museum
- Minneapolis Institute of Art
- Yale University Art Gallery
- Mount Vernon
- Cincinnati Art Museum
- Art Institute of Chicago
- Woodmere Art Museum

== Selected other exhibitions ==
- Whitney Museum of American Art, 1978
- Woodmere Art Museum, 1977, 2007
- Cleveland Museum of Art, 1989
- Tampa Museum of Art, 1995
