= Nelson Henry =

American private in the United States Army

- Henry in 2019
- Born: Nelson Henry Jr. June 15, 1923; Philadelphia, Pennsylvania, U.S.
- Died: May 9, 2020 (aged 96); Philadelphia, Pennsylvania, U.S.
- Alma mater: Temple University
- Spouse(s): Lydia Pritchett (m. 1940s; died 2016)
- Military career
- Branch: United States Army
- Service years: 1942–1945
- Rank: Private first class
- Conflicts: World War II

Nelson Henry Jr. (June 15, 1923 – May 9, 2020) was an American private in the United States Army.

== Life and military career ==
Henry was born in Philadelphia, Pennsylvania, the son of Nelson Sr., a postmaster, and Lucille Henry. He attended Lower Moreland High School, graduating in 1940. After graduating, he attended Lincoln University, a historical black university in Lower Oxford Township, Pennsylvania. While attending Lincoln, he played American football; he was listed as an end on the Lions' 1941 roster. His education was interrupted when he enlisted in the United States Army in 1942.

During his military service, Henry served in a training program as a junior officer, and held the rank of private first class. On October 17, 1945, he was discharged from the Army. According to The Columbian, he was given a blue discharge because he was "black". During the late 1940s, he appealed numerous times to have his discharge changed, but his appeals failed. He attended Temple University, earning his bachelor's degree in psychology.

In 2019, after a successful appeal, the United States Army's Board for Correction of Military Records changed Henry's blue discharge to an honorable discharge.

== Personal life and death ==
Henry married Lydia Pritchett in the 1940s. Their marriage lasted until her death in 2016.

Henry died from complications of COVID-19 at the Thomas Jefferson University Hospital in Philadelphia, Pennsylvania on May 9, 2020, at the age of 96. After his death, in June 2020, he was posthumously awarded an honorary doctorate from Lincoln University.
