= Ed Sheridan =

American soccer player

Personal information
- Date of birth: April 3, 1957 (age 69)
- Place of birth: Philadelphia, Pennsylvania, United States
- Height: 5 ft 10 in (1.78 m)
- Position: Left back

Youth career
- Philadelphia Rams

Senior career*
Years	Team	Apps	(Gls)
1979–1982	Philadelphia Fever	105	(10)
- * Club domestic league appearances and goals

Ed Sheridan is a retired American soccer defender who played professionally in the Major Indoor Soccer League.

Sheridan attended Philadelphia Textile. He graduated with a bachelor's degree in business with a minor in psychology in 1981. In 1979, he signed with the Philadelphia Fever of the Major Indoor Soccer League, playing four seasons with the team. Sheridan continues to live in suburban Philadelphia where he is a sales & marketing manager at Micronic America.
