= Aaron Muderick =

American innovator and thought leader

- Born: 31 March 1976 (age 50); Havertown, PA
- Education: B.S. in Computer Science from University of Rochester
- Occupations: Innovator and Thought leader
- Known for: Founder and Owner of Crazy Aaronʼs

Aaron Muderick (born March 31, 1976) is an American innovator and thought leader. He is the Founder and Owner of Crazy Aaron's, a toy company that created Thinking Putty.

== Early life and education ==
Born in Havertown, PA, Muderick graduated from Haverford High School in 1994. He holds a B.S. in Computer Science from the University of Rochester.

== Career ==
Muderick worked as a software engineer for Fortune 500 giants such as Apple and Sun Microsystems Javasoft division, before delving into the toy world. In 1998, he founded Crazy Aaron's, a toy company that created Thinking Putty and makes slime, dough and other fidgets.

In 2010, Muderick was elected to the Narberth Borough Council and then elected by the council to the position of Vice President which he held for six years. In 2016, he was elected to President of the council and served in that position for six years before retiring from council in 2022.

In 2019, Muderick was elected to the board of the Toy Association. In 2021, he was elected vice-chair of the Board of Directors of the Toy Association. In 2022, he was elected chair of the Board of Directors of the Toy Association and served as chairman until 2024. He is currently Chairman Emeritus of the Toy Association.

Muderick is an advocate for product safety, testifying before the US Senate Judiciary Committee to push for stricter toy regulations online.

== Community service ==
In 2007, Muderick helped found the nonprofit, the Global Exploration for Educators Organization (GEEO) which has sent thousands of teachers on overseas adventures and developed curriculum for teacher's to bring their experiences back into the classroom. He has been the treasurer of GEEO since inception.

In 2009, Muderick served as a volunteer firefighter/hoseman with Narberth Fire Company. He continues to serve as an active volunteer firefighter and has served as pyrotechnics lead for the annual fireworks display.

== Awards and honors ==
- 2023 - Baker Industries' Person of the Year
- 2024 - Handi-crafters' Best Friend Award
