= George Bagby (author) =

American novelist

Aaron Marc Stein (November 15, 1906 – August 29, 1985), known by the pen name George Bagby, was an American novelist who specialized in mystery fiction. Bagby's focus was on police investigators, especially the fictional Inspector Schmidt, Chief of Homicide for the New York Police Department. In the Schmidt novels, mystery-writer Bagby himself appears as "the Watson to Schmidt's Holmes, following him on cases, and acting as biographer." A number of his novels have been translated into other languages, including German, French, and Spanish.

== Biography ==
Stein was born on November 15, 1906, in New York City. He attended Princeton University, graduating with a degree in archaeology and also summa cum laude. His early avant-garde novels came to the attention of Theodore Dreiser and were published, but he did not gain much fame till he moved into writing mysteries. In addition to Bagby, he also published mystery novels under his own name, and under the pseudonym Hampton Stone.

He held a position as a radio critic for a New York newspaper in the 1930s, and then went to work for Time magazine. During World War II he worked with the US Army.

Over 100 novels by Stein eventually saw publication, and for his lifetime achievements the Mystery Writers of America named him a Grand Master at the 1979 Edgar Awards. His final book, The Garbage Collector, was published in 1984. Stein died of cancer in 1985, at the age of 79, in Lenox Hill Hospital in Manhattan.

== Primary works ==
In addition to the hero of most of the Bagby novels, Inspector Schmidt, Stein also created a New York City Assistant District Attorney named Jeremiah Gibson for the books published under the Stone pseudonym, and archaeologist detectives Tim Mulligan and Elsie Mae Hunt, as well as engineer Matt Herridge, for the mysteries published under his own name.

Stein's first novel was published in 1930. His first mystery, Murder at the Piano, was published in 1935. The first novel written as Stone was titled The Corpse in the Corner Saloon. It was reviewed in the New York Times in 1948.

== Selected list of novels ==
- The Most Wanted (1983)
- My Dead Body (1976)
- Two in the Bush (1976)
- Killer Boy Was Here
- Cop Killer
- Dead Storage
- A Dirty Way to Die
- Dead Drunk
- Dead on Arrival (1946)
- Scared to Death (1952)
- Drop Dead
- In Cold Blood
- Red Is for Killing
- Murder on the Nose
- Murder at the Piano
- Bachelors' Wife
- Give the Little Corpse a Great Big Hand
- Bird Walking Weather (published in French under the title Purée de Pois, Paris, Librairie des Champs-Élysées, Le Masque No. 410, 1952)
- Here Comes the Corpse (1941)
