= Judith Schermer =

American artist and writer (born 1941)

- Born: February 19, 1941 (age 84); Detroit
- Occupation(s): Painter; former children's author/illustrator
- Years active: c. 1973–2000s
- Children: 2 daughters
- Parents: George Schermer (father); Bernice Schermer (né Augdahl) (mother)
- Relatives: 1 sister

Judith Schermer (born on February 19, 1941) is a Detroit-born, Philadelphia-based painter who also wrote and illustrated for children during the 1970s and 1980s.

== Life and career ==
Schermer was born on February 19, 1941, in Detroit, Michigan. Her father, Minnesota-born George Schermer, worked in human and urban relations; her mother Bernice had jobs in real estate and teaching. She attended the Universities of Colorado and Pennsylvania in 1964, and Chicago during 1965–67, returning to the Pennsylvania facilities in 1970–72. She was also a member of the Philadelphia Art Alliance.

Schermer studied anthropology in college, but later chose to pursue a career in painting and illustration. Self-taught in that field, she used oils and acrylics in her artwork. Between c. 1973 and 1983, she illustrated titles by other writers; by 1979, she also illustrated Mouse in House, her first and only book as an author.

In 1995, the rundown state of the Philadelphia Naval Home (situated close to her residence) inspired Schermer to create a painting called Burgeoning. Entering the 2000s, her works were exhibited at the city's Third Street Gallery.

== Critical analysis ==
As The Philadelphia Inquirer wrote in March 2000, "Schermer's [evocation of] lines, angles and shadows [in depictions of buildings]... results in crisply defined patterns of the kind that Charles Sheeler made famous. ... [Her] small-scale [art is] understated in every particular, but not so matter-of-fact that they seem as ordinary as her raw material." Her works, according to the Philadelphia Daily News, "capture a contemporary moment reminiscent of early DeChirico paintings, when forms seem suspended in time."

== Selected works ==
- Break the Smoking Habit (1977; by Ovide F. and Cynthia S. Pomerleau; Research Press)
- Mouse in House (1979; Houghton Mifflin)
- Stepdog (1983; by Marlene F. Shyer; Scribner)
