= Swiss Miss =

American cocoa powder and pudding brand

- Logo used since 2010

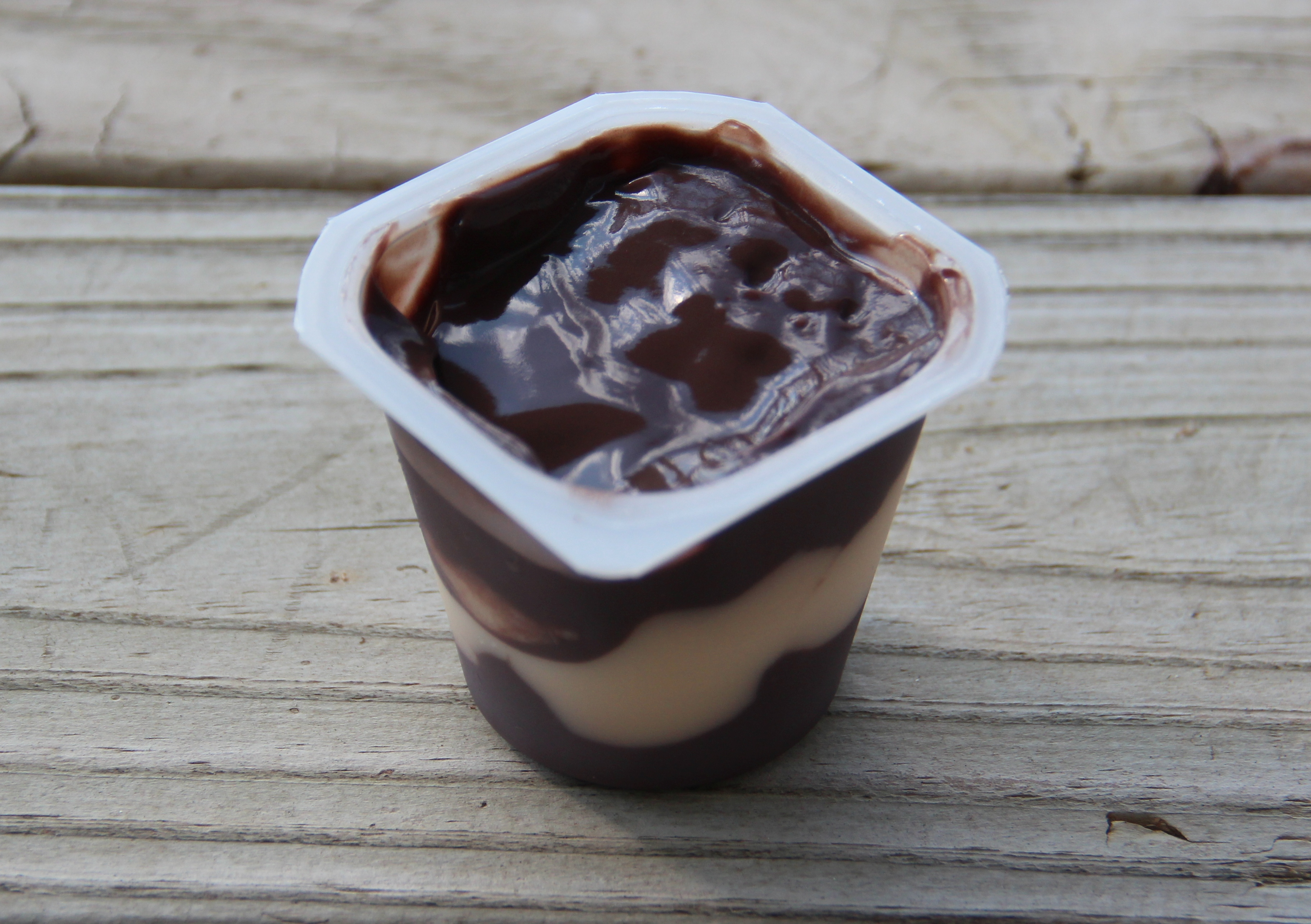
- A cup of Swiss Miss pudding
- Product type: Cocoa powder
- Current owner: Conagra Brands (Universal Robina in the Philippines)
- Country: United States
- Introduced: 1961
- Markets: Worldwide

Swiss Miss is an American brand name for cocoa powder and pudding products created by Charles Sanna and sold by American food company Conagra Brands.

== History ==
In the 1950s, the company sold its original hot cocoa product for commercial use, distributed in pre-measured packets to airlines and restaurants. After the drink became popular, it reformulated its mix for greater shelf stability for stores. The resulting consumer product was introduced in 1961 as the first powdered hot cocoa mix that could be prepared with water instead of milk.

In 1967, the brand was sold to Beatrice Foods, which was later acquired by ConAgra. As of 2019, it had estimated annual sales of 50 million boxes of cocoa mix.
