= Samuel Meeker =

American businessman

Samuel Meeker (1763–1831) was a prominent merchant businessman who played a substantial role in the development of banking, shipping, and insurance systems in the early post-revolutionary days of Philadelphia, Pennsylvania.

The Meeker family was already known by this time as a founding family in New Jersey (associate founder William Meeker), providing strong and hardy patriotic males in the fight against the British. A Meeker cousin, Major Samuel Meeker, was known to have encouraged his militia to chase after Chief Joseph Brant and his band of warriors and Tories in the Battle of the Minisink. Samuel's father, also a ‘Samuel Meeker’, was a captain and commanded a troop of light horse that was recruited in Essex county NJ. A young man of action, Samuel left New Jersey early in the 1790s to seek his fame and fortune in Philadelphia.
