= Kee Taylor =

American hair stylist, business executive, and YouTuber

- Official YouTube logo
- Born: Annagjid Taylor; Philadelphia, Pennsylvania, U.S.
- Occupations: Hair stylist; Business executive; YouTuber

YouTube information
- Channel: DeeperThanHairTV
- Years active: 2015–present
- Subscribers: 1.32 million
- Last updated: April 16, 2022
- Website: deeperthanhair.com

Annagjid "Kee" Taylor is American hair stylist, business executive, and YouTuber. Taylor is best known as the owner of Deeper Than Hair salon and the accompanying YouTube channel Deeper Than Hair TV, which has approximately 1.3 million subscribers. She is a celebrity hair stylist and is also the CEO of the hair care product line Deeper Than Hair.

== Life and career ==
Taylor was raised in Philadelphia, Pennsylvania. She began her career braiding hair as a teenager in the mid 1990s, working out of her mother's basement. Eventually, she became a celebrity stylist while also working four days a week at a West Philadelphia-based salon Philly Cuts. Taylor began using social media to promote her business in 2012 while working at the salon Philly Cuts. She promoted a sew-in extensions special on Instagram that was very successful and led her to consider opening her own shop.

Taylor opened her salon, Deeper Than Hair, in April 2013, also located in West Philadelphia. She selected the name as an homage to her devotion to hair care as an art. The salon specializes in treating natural afro-textured hair, and Taylor is known for styling natural hair into straightened hairstyles. She released a hair care line of the same name in 2014. Next, she launched her YouTube channel, Deeper Than Hair TV, in 2015 to provide education on the health and styling of Black hair. As of 2021 her channel has over one million subscribers.

Taylor moved to North Hollywood, Los Angeles in 2017, where she is a celebrity stylist on television productions including The Haves and the Have Nots. Her celebrity clients include Estelle, Tika Sumpter, Amber Riley, Nafessa Williams, and Keke Palmer. To promote the beauty of afro-textured hair, Taylor published the children's book All Hair Is Good Hair in 2019.

=== Viral hashtags ===
In 2020, Taylor created the viral #DMXChallenge to showcase the versatility of Black women's hair. It features images of her with various hairstyles while DMX raps a list of women's names in the song "What These Bitches Want". Her 2021 #BlackEffectChallenge went viral during Black History Month, which shows Taylor with 13 different natural hairstyles displayed with the background track "Black Effect" by the Carters.
