= Anne Luther Bagby =

American Baptist missionary

- Born: March 20, 1859; Kansas City
- Died: December 22, 1942; Recife
- Occupation: Missionary
- Spouse: William Buck Bagby

Anne Luther Bagby (March 20, 1859- December 22, 1942) was an American Baptist missionary from Texas. She was the first woman from the Texas Baptists to become a foreign missionary. She also served as a leader of the Texas Baptists when she was not doing missionary work in Brazil. Overall, Bagby worked as a missionary for sixty-one years. Six of her nine children also became missionaries.

== Biography ==
Bagby came to Texas from Kentucky with her parents who came to work at what was formerly known as Baylor Female College (now University of Mary Hardin-Baylor). Crossing the country, she was baptized in the Mississippi River when she was eleven. Her father, John Luther, became the president of Baylor Female College. Bagby felt that she had a "calling to become a missionary at age 19". Some accounts, however, state that Bagby felt the calling to be a missionary by age 12. Bagby graduated from the University of Mary Hardin-Baylor in 1879 and became a teacher. She met her husband, William Buck Bagby at a missions conference. In 1880, she and William Buck were married. Also in 1880, Anne Bagby helped to organize the first Woman's Missionary Union in Texas.

Bagby and her husband, William Bagdy, went to Brazil as missionaries in 1881. Bagby, who had always wanted to be a missionary, had convinced her husband to go. Anne Bagby and her husband may have also both been influenced to do their missionary work in Brazil through their correspondence with Alexander T. Hawthorn who had lived in Brazil. The Bagbys started out preaching in the colony of Santa Barbara (in Brazil) which was a settlement established by ex-Confederates attempting to start a "new Southern aristocracy." Trouble in Santa Barbara convinced the Bagbys to move the mission to Salvador Bahia.

In 1882, she and her husband, along with Zachery and Kate Taylor, created the first Baptist church for Brazilians in Salvador Bahia. The church was formally organized in October 1882 and consisted of five members, the missionaries themselves and a local priest, Senior Teixeira, who had been converted. Bagby and Kate Taylor wanted to create Bible classes and other programs, but waited. During their time in Salvador Bahia, William Bagby was arrested during a baptism ceremony and imprisoned. When Anne Bagby found out, she insisted that she be imprisoned along with him, and was. Eventually they were both released.

Later, the mission went to Rio de Janeiro in 1891. However, the bulk of the group's successes were in São Paulo City, where Anne Bagby created a flagship school for girls. Bagby felt that starting a school would afford her a "comparable, if not superior, influence" to preaching, which was exclusive to men at the time. The school was taken over by Bagby in 1901. Bagby was involved in the training of teachers for the school, which was twice the size of any other Protestant school in Brazil at the time. By 1913, the school had 175 students. In 1919, Bagby traveled to Houston in order to attend the annual session for the Women's Missionary Union.

Bagby's husband died of pneumonia in 1939. Anne Bagby died in Brazil on December 22, 1942. Two books have been published about their lives and missionary work. The first was written by Helen Bagby, The Bagbys of Brazil (1954 OCLC 3462810) and a second was published more recently by Daniel B. Lancaster, The Bagbys of Brazil: The Life and Work of William Buck and Anne Luther Bagby (1998 ISBN 978-1-571-68251-2). Kathryn Thompson Presley, reviewing Lancaster's book for The Southwestern Historical Quarterly, called his book "refreshingly honest" and carefully detailed.
