= Rachel Bagby =

American singer-songwriter

Rachel Bagby is a US-based, award-winning performance artist, author, poet, composer, and vocalist.

== Biography ==
Rachel Bagby, J.D. (Stanford Law School) is the originator of the poetic form she calls Dekaaz™; a form consisting of ten syllables in three-lines. The first line is 2 syllables, the second is 3 syllables and the last line is 5 syllables. The name comes from the Greek root of the word ten (deka) + the letters "a" and "z" to signify the range of human experience that can be expressed in "just ten/syllables/...three lines 2/3/5." To complete the process of creating a Dekaaz, you must speak it out loud to another living being.

Bagby is also the author of Divine Daughters: Liberating the Power and Passion of Women's Voices (Harper San Francisco, 1999). Her publications include articles about sustainability in Natural Home, The Wall Street Journal, Time, Ms. Magazine, Women of Power, and others, as well as poetry in literary journals. Her anthologized contributions can be found in Nature and the Human Spirit: Toward an Expanded Land Management Ethic, (Venture Publishing, State College, PA, 1995); Circles of Strength: Community Alternatives to Alienation, (New Society Publishing, Philadelphia, PA 1993); Reweaving the World: The Emergence of Ecofeminism, (Sierra Club Books, San Francisco, CA 1990); and Healing the Wounds (New Society Publishing, Santa Cruz, CA: 1989).

She has released two recordings of her compositions, Full and Reach Across the Lines. Full features her soundtrack for the Emmy Award-winning documentary, Dialogues with Madwomen.

Bagby has established Singing Farm, a solar-powered, 20-acre organic farm and musical learning center in Central Virginia.

== Honors ==
- Donella Meadows Sustainability Institute Fellow (2009–2010)
- Arts and Healing Network Artist of the Year Award (2008)
- Bioneers Award (2003)
- Advisory Council for the River of Words program, co-founded by former US Poet Laureate Robert Haas

== Bibliography ==
- Bagby, Rachel (1999). Divine Daughters. San Francisco: HarperSanFrancisco. ISBN 0062514261.
- Diamond, Irene (1990). Reweaving the World: The Emergence of Ecofeminism. San Francisco: Sierra Club Books. ISBN 0871566230.
- Driver, Beverly (1996). Nature and the Human Spirit: Toward an Expanded Land Management Ethic. State College, PA: Venture Publishing. ISBN 0910251827.
- Forsey, Helen (1993). Circles of Strength: Community Alternative to Alienation. Philadelphia: New Society Publishers. ISBN 086571259X.
- Plant, Judith (1989). Healing the Wounds. Santa Cruz: New Society Publishing. ISBN 9781897408094.
- Sigerman, Harriet (2007). The Columbia Documentary History of American Women Since 1941. New York Chichester: Columbia University Press. ISBN 9780231116992.

== Discography ==
- Full (1993)
- Reach Across the Lines (1989 and 2006)
