= Philadelphia Pennsylvania Temple =

Temple of the LDS Church

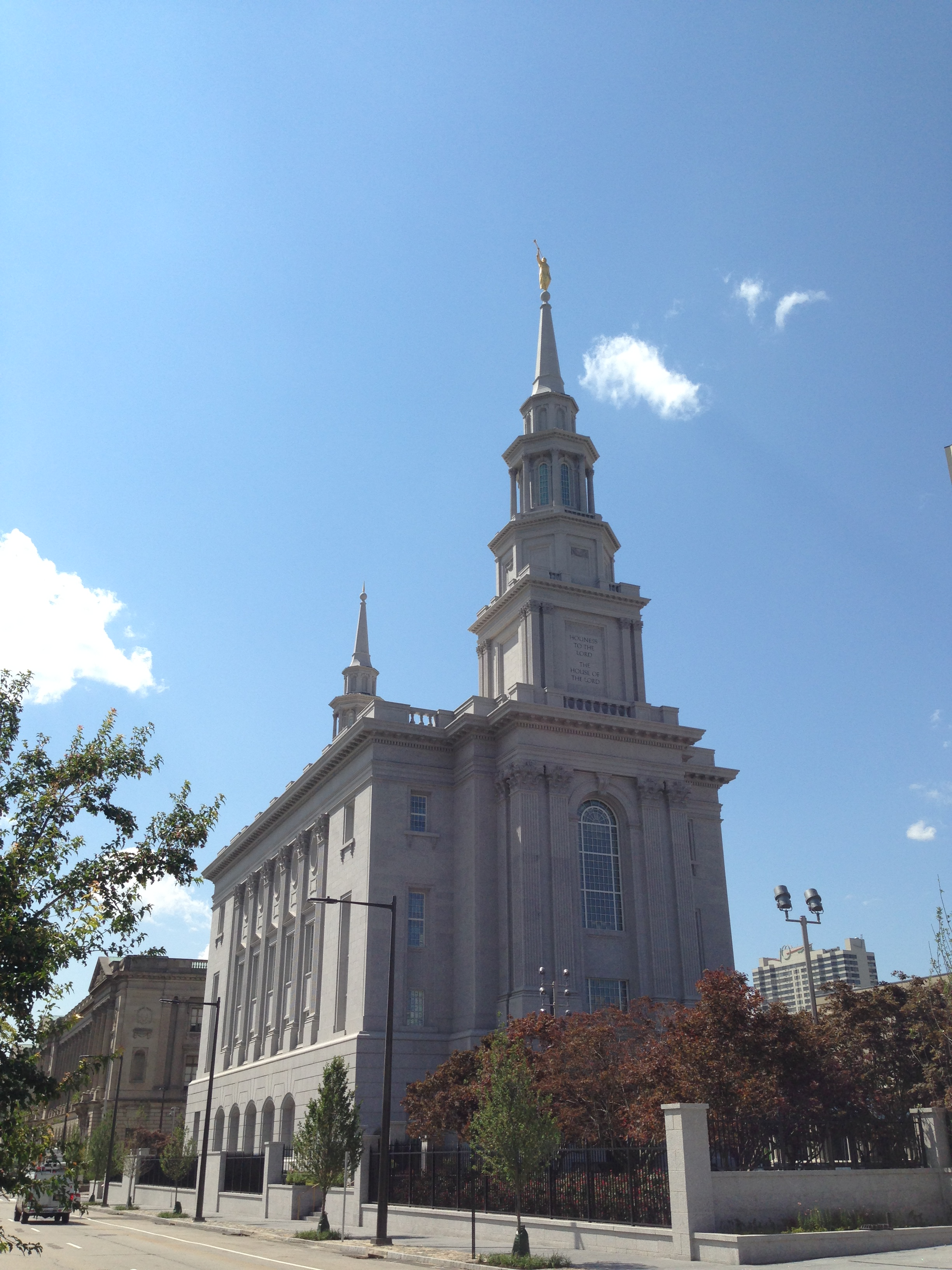
- East and south facades in July 2016
- Interactive map of Philadelphia Pennsylvania Temple
- Number: 152
- Dedication: September 18, 2016, by Henry B. Eyring
- Site: 1.6 acres (0.65 ha)
- Floor area: 61,466 ft^{2} (5,710.4 m^{2})
- Height: 208.2 ft (63.5 m)
- Official website • News & images

Church chronology
← Sapporo Japan Temple	Philadelphia Pennsylvania Temple	→ Fort Collins Colorado Temple

Additional information
- Announced: October 4, 2008, by Thomas S. Monson
- Groundbreaking: September 17, 2011, by Henry B. Eyring
- Open house: Friday, August 5, 2016-Saturday, September 3, 2016
- Current president: Kent A. Jordan
- Location: Philadelphia, Pennsylvania, U.S.
- Coordinates: 39°57′32.17″N 75°10′5.07″W
- Exterior finish: Granite
- Baptistries: 1
- Ordinance rooms: 2 (two-stage progressive)
- Sealing rooms: 4
- Clothing rental: Yes
- Notes: Announced at the 178th Semiannual General Conference.

The Philadelphia Pennsylvania Temple is a temple of the Church of Jesus Christ of Latter-day Saints (LDS Church) in the Logan Square neighborhood of Philadelphia. Completed in 2016, the intent to construct the temple was announced on October 4, 2008, during the church's general conference by LDS Church president Thomas S. Monson. The temple is the church's first in the state of Pennsylvania, and the first temple between Washington, D.C., and New York City.

== History ==
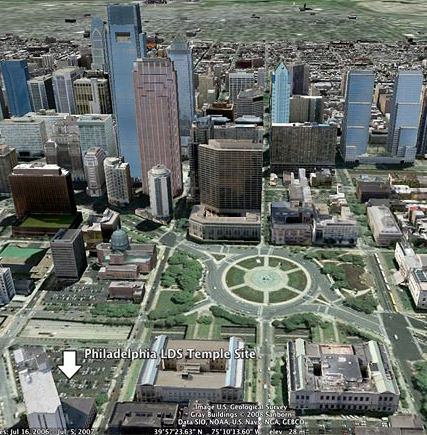
Location of Philadelphia Pennsylvania Temple at 1739 Vine Street in Philadelphia from the USGS map

Following the October 2008 announcement of plans to build a temple in Philadelphia, on November 19, 2009, the LDS Church announced it would be on Vine Street in downtown Philadelphia, directly northeast of Logan Circle. This location places the temple near the Parkway Central Library, Family Court Building, and the Cathedral Basilica of Saints Peter and Paul, head church of the Roman Catholic Archdiocese of Philadelphia.

Local community leaders were present for groundbreaking ceremonies on September 17, 2011, Henry B. Eyring, First Counselor in the church's First Presidency, presiding. By July 2012, no significant work had begun on the temple as a contractor had not been found to remove the existing parking lot and start the below ground excavation for the two-level parking garage. In November 2012, the Philadelphia Art Commission granted final approval for the temple design, despite some members feeling the building was too similar to other buildings in the vicinity in its appearance. Most of the parking lot on the temple site had been removed by February 2013, and by May 2 that year, the underground digging for the building of the temple had been completed. The building was framed to its full height by August 2014.

== Exterior design and decoration ==
The church commissioned a contemporary temple from Perkins&Will but chose a neoclassical design from architect of record FFKR, with Perkins+Will designing the temple's interior, plaza, garage, landscape, and a services building. Roger Jackson of FFKR said that his company studied notable Philadelphia buildings when designing the temple, such as Christ Church's tower, Independence Hall's interior, and Franklin Institute.

The exterior is light gray Deer Island granite—unlike the pre-cast concrete of most temples—to match nearby buildings, as does the Corinthian order detailing. Forty-four Japanese maple trees are at the base of the temple. Its interior uses Georgian style to represent the early history of the United States and LDS Church.

== Temple complex ==
City and church officials announced in February 2014 that a meetinghouse and a 32-story residential building would be built on a lot adjacent to the temple site, at 1601 Vine Street. The residential structure and meetinghouse were designed by Paul L. Whalen of RAMSA. The meetinghouse serves approximately 1,000 of the 25,000 Latter-day Saints in the Philadelphia area and includes a Family History Center. The residential building includes 258 apartments and 13 townhouses, along with retail space, and be subject to regular, applicable taxes.

== Open house and dedication ==
A public open house was held from August 10 through September 9, 2016, excluding Sundays. According to the church, approximately 140,000 visitors attended the open house. A youth cultural celebration, which recognized the heritage of the region through song, dance, and narration, was held on September 17. Like the groundbreaking in 2011, the cultural celebration occurred on the anniversary of the signing of the U.S. Constitution. The temple was formally dedicated by Eyring on September 18, 2016.

== Reception ==
Temples in the Mid-Atlantic States
- = Operating
- = Under construction
- = Announced
- = Temporarily Closed
- = Historical/Efforts Suspended

In 2016, Inga Saffron, architecture critic for The Philadelphia Inquirer, called the temple "the most radical work of architecture built in Philadelphia in a half-century ... because it dares to be so out of step with today's design sensibilities and our bottom-line culture." Estimating its cost at more than $100 million, she wrote that the temple was "the real classical deal" and "a bold incursion into the hierarchical fabric of Philadelphia". Saffron praised the interior woodwork as "exceptional" and approved of the exterior replicating the nearby Family Court building, "the last truly satisfying neoclassical design". She criticized the decision to put the front door on 17th Street, stating that the temple "turns its back on Logan Square. It occupies this important civic space without being a real participant". Saffron also disliked the design of the LDS chapel next door, describing the Robert A. M. Stern-designed building as "strange ... a squashed cupcake with a giant candle stuck on top", with a "baffling" drainage ditch on Vine Street.

Jeffrey S. Markovitz of Hidden City Philadelphia agreed that the temple "respects the neoclassical monuments of the Logan Square neighborhood", stating that it "is simultaneously new and appears to have been there all along". He concluded that Benjamin Franklin Parkway gained "an august edifice [that] joins a list of the city's most noteworthy architectural monuments". Curbed described the temple as the "most unexpected surprise" of Philadelphia architecture that year. Architect Jackson claimed that in 2016 a tour guide told a friend that the temple was "'one of the old buildings' ... That was not our intent, but it was a side benefit".

In 2016, the temple won The Institute of Classical Architecture and Art Philadelphia chapter's Trumbauer Award: Excellence in Contemporary Classicism. In 2017, it won the Excellence in Craftsmanship award from the General Building Contractors Association.

== See also ==
- Comparison of temples of The Church of Jesus Christ of Latter-day Saints
- List of temples of The Church of Jesus Christ of Latter-day Saints
- List of temples of The Church of Jesus Christ of Latter-day Saints by geographic region
- Temple architecture (Latter-day Saints)
- The Church of Jesus Christ of Latter-day Saints in Pennsylvania
