= Family court (disambiguation) =

Family court is any court that deals with family law.

Family court may also refer to:

== Law ==
- Family Court of Australia
- Family Court of Western Australia
- Family Court (Hong Kong)
- Hawaii State Family Courts
- Family Court (Ireland)
- Family Court (England and Wales)
- Family Courts Act 1980 of New Zealand
- New York Family Court
- Philadelphia Family Court
- Family Court Building located in Philadelphia and formerly housed the Philadelphia Family Court

== Television ==
- The Family Court (TV series)
- Family Court with Judge Penny, a syndicated TV program

== See also ==
- Family law (disambiguation)
