= Grace Gemberling =

American painter (1903–1997)

- Grace Gemberling
- Born: Grace Thorp Gemberling; July 31, 1903; Philadelphia, Pennsylvania, US
- Died: December 26, 1997 (aged 94); Bala Cynwyd, Pennsylvania, US
- Resting place: West Laurel Hill Cemetery, Bala Cynwyd
- Education: Pennsylvania Academy of Fine Arts
- Known for: Artist, art teacher
- Spouse: W. R. Morton Keast (1888–1973)
- Awards: From the Pennsylvania Academy of Fine Arts: Cresson Traveling Scholarship, 1923, 1924; Lambert Purchase Prize, 1930; Mary Smith Prize for best painting by a Philadelphia woman artist, 1930; Fellowship Prize, 1931 (Gold Medal Award), 1940. From the National Association of Women Painters and Sculptors: Oliver Beck Figure Composition Prize, 1933.

Grace Thorp Gemberling (July 31, 1903 – December 26, 1997) was an American artist known for the broad range of her subjects in paintings having a pronounced psychological as well as aesthetic impact. One critic said they conveyed a mood that was "ethereal, bold and engaged". Another said her work showed "a disciplined hand and a romantic eye" together with "a magical color sense". Known for her control of detail and successful handling of line and blocks of color, she was said to paint in a modernist style that stayed clear of abstraction and was remembered by a teacher and fellow artist as "the finest woman painter in Philadelphia during the 1920s and 1930s".

== Early life and training ==
Gemberling grew up on a farm her family owned in Selinsgrove, Pennsylvania. She developed an interest in art while a student at Friends' Central School. With the encouragement of her parents, she enrolled in the Pennsylvania Academy of Fine Arts in 1920 and for the next three years she studied under Daniel Garber, Hugh Breckenridge, (Note: Hugh H. Breckenridge (1870-1937) was a prominent Philadelphia painter and teacher. Educated in the Pennsylvania Academy of Fine Arts, he made portraits in the academic style, landscapes that showed a strong influence of neo-impressionism, and later works that are fully abstract. He began teaching at the Academy in 1894 and was appointed dean of instructors in 1934.) and Arthur Carles. Showing great promise as a student, she received the valuable Cresson Traveling Scholarship in both 1923 and 1924. (Note: The Cresson Traveling Scholarship was created in 1902 by Emlen Cresson and his wife in honor of their son, an artist who died young. Winners were chosen from among students who were 35 or younger and who had been studying at the Academy for at least 96 weeks. They were given advice on where in Europe to travel and what to see but were free to make their own itineraries. In 1923 and again in 1924 Gemberling was awarded $700 for summer travel. During the first trip she and her mother visited France, England, and Italy and in second they expanded their tour, visiting the same countries plus Spain, Czechoslovakia, Germany, and Austria.)

== Career ==
Gemberling's career as a professional artist began after she returned from European travel in 1924 and decided not to continue attending classes at the Pennsylvania Academy of Fine Arts. When in 1926 she exhibited with the Philadelphia Water Color Club, a reviewer said her painting, "Marine" was "gorgeous", (Note: In 1900 a group of painters founded the Philadelphia Water Color Club to promote the medium and give publicity to watercolorists. With the cooperation and support of the Pennsylvania Academy of Fine Arts, the club held annual exhibitions of works on paper by members and other artists. As well as watercolors, the exhibitions included pastel, pencil, and charcoal works as well as illustrations and graphic arts. It used purchase funds to make annual additions to its collections. The group continues to exist, now known as the Philadelphia Water Color Society. Prominent former members include Cecilia Beaux, Andrew Wyeth, John Singer Sargent and Maxfield Parrish.) and later that year when she exhibited at the Plastic Club, the same reviewer praised a portrait of hers, "Anna Ruth", as "nicely spontaneous." Thereafter, her paintings appeared frequently in Philadelphia exhibitions and quite often received favorable notice. (Note: Thus, for example, she received another favorable notice in the Plastic Club's exhibitions of 1929 and 1930, the Women's University Club in 1938, and exhibitions at Friends' Central in 1942 and 1943, and exhibitions at the Academy in 1938 and 1943,) From 1930 onwards, she showed in other East Coast locations including the Corcoran Biennials of 1930 and 1935 in Washington, D.C.; the Salons of America (Note: Founded in 1922 by Hamilton Easter Field, Salons of America aimed to give artists an alternative to the Society of Independent Artists whose financial and publicity methods he found objectionable. A reporter said he aimed "to give equal opportunity to every member, whether he or she be a conservative or a post-Dadaist.") and National Association of Women Painters and Sculptors exhibitions of 1932 in New York; and exhibitions held by the North Shore Art Association of Gloucester, Massachusetts, in 1932 and 1933.

=== Artistic style ===
I paint to express some personal reaction and I aim toward something deeper than the superficial. I try to appeal not only to the emotional through color, but to the intellectual through design and subject.

— Interview appearing in the Main Line Daily Times (Ardmore, Penn., 1933), quoted in Artist Profile; Grace Gemberling Keast (H. L. Chalfont Gallery, [ca. 2006])

During the course of her career critics frequently noticed Gemberling's competent handling of color (Note: In 1926 the Philadelphia critic, C.H. Bonte said Gemberling's watercolor, "Marine," was almost as gorgeous as a similar painting by Hugh Breckinridge having "masses of rich color superbly disposed on the canvas." In 1927 a critic writing in the American Magazine of Art said she was "seen to be playing with color highly spiced." In 1929 Bonte called Gemberling a "colorist above all else." In 1932 a critic saw "decided freshness" in her handling of color. In 1938 a critic writing in Philadelphia Art News said that Gemberling had "a little secret of her own when she prepares her colors. We don't know what it is, but we have felt its effect—the undeniable stamp of an artist's color personality ..." In 2001 a critic said she showed "a magical color sense.") and her skill in design and execution. (Note: In 1926 a critic noted the appearance of "spontaneous execution"in her work. In 1932 New York Times critic Edward Alden Jewell praised her ability to build "a design that transcends subject" and another critic praised her "eye for dramatic activity." In 1938 a Philadelphia Inquirer critic, R. Edward Lewis, noted that "design rates high" in Gemberling's work. and the same year a critic praised its "simple but fruitful wedding of line and color mass.")

Grace Gemberling, "Professor Otakar Sevcik," about 1926, height: 13.3 inches, width: 10.625 inches.

Critics singled out specific paintings for discussion. Regarding "Otakar Sevcik" C. H. Bonte of The Philadelphia Inquirer wrote: "Her so called 'sketch' of Professor Otakar Sevcik (1852-1936) is a creation of so much life, charm and dignity of coloring as to constitute a finished portrait".

Grace Gemberling, Untitled (landscape), undated, oil on canvas, height: 28 inches, width: 35 inches

In reviewing an untitled landscape Scott Chalfont wrote in an exhibition catalog: "So characteristic of Gemberling's finest talent, in this landscape she takes a scene and makes it her own. From the wispy trees, to the dark skies and vibrant houses, the contrasts create a compelling painting". In 1938, a critic wrote:

As personal as are the creations of Grace Gemberling, there is extraordinary variety in her canvasses. The artist's delineation of well-worn houses is unique as her interpretation of them in color, and there is nothing we like more than the simple but fruitful wedding of line and color mass. Control of detail is, in this case, an additional gift. Canvases may be flooded with subsidiary graphic or pigmental themes, but there is never confusion. Grace Gemberling is one of Philadelphia's most promising painters.

Grace Gemberling, "Colonial Stairway," about 1943, oil on canvas, height: 35 inches, width: 26 inches

Concerning the painting "Colonial Stairway" Chalfont wrote: "One of the more realistically interpreted compositions by Gemberling, this is clearly the "Montmorenci" Stair Hall at Winterthur Museum. Wonderfully rendered, this painting invites the viewer into the opulence of the interior and demonstrates her deep appreciation for the Winterthur Museum and the impressive collection within".

=== Exhibitions and awards ===
The exhibitions in which Gemberling participated were mostly non-commercial. The two organizations that showed her work more than any others were both ones where she had been a student: She contributed paintings, watercolors, and drawings to nearly all the annual exhibitions held by the Pennsylvania Academy of Fine Arts between 1927 and 1943 (Note: Her work was included in PAFA exhibitions in 1927, 1930, 1931, 1932, 1934, 1936, 1938, 1939, 1940, and 1943.) and to many of the annual exhibitions held at Friends' Central School between 1934 and 1955. (Note: She contributed paintings to exhibitions at Friends' Central in 1934, 1936, 1941, 1942, 1943, 1948, 1949, and 1955.) Other non-commercial organizations that showed her work on multiple occasions included the Plastic Club of Philadelphia, (Note: Gemberling showed at the Plastic Club in 1926, 1929, 1930, and 1931.) the Corcoran Gallery of Art, (Note: She showed in Corcoran Gallery exhibitions of modern American paintings in 1930, 1935, and 1937.) the North Shore Art Association, (Note: Her paintings were included in North Shore exhibitions in 1932 and 1933.) and the National Association of Women Painters and Sculptors. (Note: She appeared in group shows of this organization in 1932 and 1933.) Non-commercial organizations that showed her a single time included the City Art Museum of St. Louis (1930), Salons of America (New York, 1932), Philadelphia Water Color Club (1926), National Academy of Design (New York, 1932), Whitney Museum of American Art (New York, 1934), Society of Independent Artists (New York, 1934), Studio House (Washington, D.C., 1936), (Note: In 1902, the American socialite and painter, Alice Pike Barney, built a townhouse in Washington, D.C., to showcase local artistic talent. When she died in 1931 her two daughters, Natalie Clifford Barney and Laura Clifford Barney, jointly inherited the building and made it available for exhibitions such as the one in which Gemberling participated. In 1999 the sisters donated Studio House to the Smithsonian Institution and in 2001 it became the Embassy of Latvia.) Women's University Club (Philadelphia, 1938), Federal Art Project show at the Philadelphia Museum of Art (1938), and Everyman's Gallery (Art Alliance, Philadelphia, 1953).

Her relatively few exhibitions in private galleries included a solo exhibition at the Mellon Galleries in Philadelphia (1933), Gimbel Galleries in Philadelphia (1935) and group shows at the Boyer Gallery's two locations, Philadelphia, and New York (both in 1936). (Note: The Boyer Gallery, located at Broad Street Station, was run by a Russian-American named C. Philip Boyer, who was known for representing the influential Armenian-American painter, Arshile Gorky. Boyer was notorious for his poor business practices, as artists, including Gorky, complained that he would hold back their works not pay them for sales he made. Before opening the gallery that bore his name, Boyer ran the Mellon Galleries and then the Gimbel Galleries of Contemporary Art. After opening the Boyer Gallery in Philadelphia be acquired the Valentine Gallery in New York and renamed it the Boyer Gallery.)

Gemberling was known for the number of important awards she had won. Most came from the Pennsylvania Academy of Fine Arts, which honored her twice with its highly valued student award, the Cresson Traveling Scholarship, in 1923 and 1924, and twice with its Fellowship Prize, given by members of the Academy to one of its own (1931, 1940). It also awarded her the Lambert Purchase Prize and the Mary Smith Prize for best painting by a Philadelphia woman artist, both in 1930, and a Gold Medal for her painting "Landscape." (Note: The source of this information, a web page by H. L. Chalfont Galleries, does not give a date for the Gold Medal award.) She also won the Oliver Beck Figure Composition Prize from the National Association of Women Painters and Sculptors in 1933.

== Art teacher ==
During the 1930s, Gemberling gave art instruction in her studio in Bala Cynwyd, Pennsylvania. One of her students, Jane Piper, later became a well-known artist.

== Personal life and family ==
Gemberling was born in Philadelphia on July 31, 1903. Her parents were Joseph Burton Gemberling and Lulu Sarah Thorp Gemberling (Note: Lulu Sarah Thorp's surname is sometimes rendered as Thorpe. An image of the signature she put on her marriage license and passport applications, though imprecise, appears to be Thorp.) who married December 28, 1898, and whose home was in "Ivy Cottage," Bala Cynwyd, Pennsylvania. Her father was born in Selinsgrove, Pennsylvania in 1867 and died in 1943. He was a successful construction manager for a company that built bridges. Her mother was born in 1880. Gemberling had an older sister named Josephine who performed in concert on the violin in the years prior to her marriage in 1927 to Donald Robb Cochran. The family spent summer vacations on the Gemberling farm in Selinsgrove. Gemberling was educated at Friends Central School in Philadelphia before enrolling in the Pennsylvania Academy of Fine Arts.

In the late 1930s, Gemberling married a well known Philadelphia architect, W. R. Morton Keast, and remained married to him until his death. Keast had two daughters by a prior marriage. (Note: Gemberling's step-daughters were Collette and Laurette Keast.) He and Gemberling had no children. (Note: Keast's first wife was Susette Schultz Keast. She was born in 1892 and died in 1932. She was a prominent Philadelphia artist, Orientalist, and member of the Philadelphia Ten group of artists. She exhibited frequently at the Plastic Club and was for some years its president.) Keast was the chief designer for the architectural firm run by John T. Windrim. In the 1920s and 1930s he designed a number of major buildings in Philadelphia including the Franklin Institute, the Municipal Court Building, the Wannamaker's Men's Store (now known as One South Broad, and the Fidelity Bank Building. He was born in Germantown in 1888 and died Bala Cynwyd in 1873.

From the late 1940s through the 1960s, Gemberling was active in Philadelphia society. The great-granddaughter of a Revolutionary War veteran (Johann Jacob Gemberling), she joined and became leader (Regent) of the Thomas Leiper chapter of the Daughters of the American Revolution. (Note: See also the DAR research databases and the "Gemberlings in America" web site.) She was also an active member of the Pennsylvania Chapter of the National Society of Daughters of Founders and Patriots of America, the National Society of the Colonial Dames of America, and the Pennsylvania Society of New England Women. Gemberling was an avid gardener and member of the Philadelphia Society of Little Gardens. (Note: She maintained an indoor garden in her town house on Rittenhouse Street which she opened to visitors during local garden visiting events.) She died on December 26, 1997, and was buried in the West Laurel Hill Cemetery, Bala Cynwyd.

Other names

Gemberling's full name was Grace Thorp Gemberling. Thorp was her mother's maiden name; it is sometimes given as Thorpe. She commonly used Grace Gemberling prior to her marriage although sometimes she would use Grace T. Gemberling. The New York Times usually referred to her as Grace Thorp Gemberling. (Note: Once or twice The Philadelphia Inquirer also used Grace Thorp Gemberling.) In addition to these name usages, following her marriage she was also called Grace Gemberling Keast, Grace Keast, Grace G. Keast, or Mrs. W. R. Morton Keast.
