= The Alexander =

Coordinates: 39.9587°N 75.1653°W

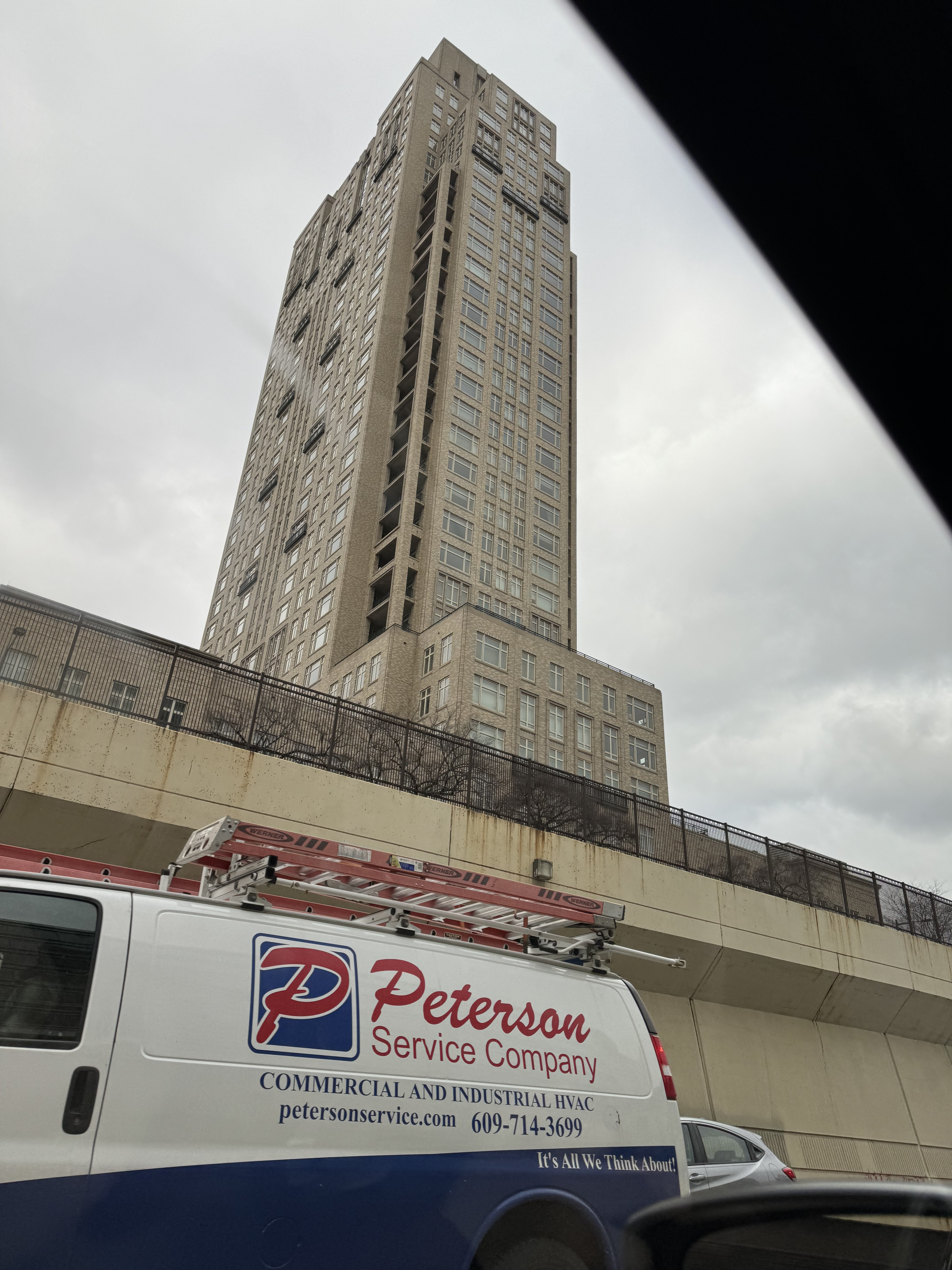

- Location within Philadelphia Location within Pennsylvania Location within the United States

General information
- Status: opened
- Type: Residential
- Location: 300 Alexander Court, Philadelphia, Pennsylvania, United States
- Opening: May24, 2018

Height
- Roof: 375 ft (114 m)

Technical details
- Floor count: 32

Design and construction
- Architect: RAMSA
- Developer: Property Reserve Inc

The Alexander (originally 1601 Vine Street) is a mixed-use high-rise in Philadelphia. The building is adjacent to the Philadelphia Pennsylvania Temple, which was designed by Perkins+Will. This project consists of one tower, as well as a Mormon meetinghouse next to the building, which will be clad in red brick.

== Usage ==
The tower is approximately 375 feet in height. The tower contains roughly 264 apartments, as well as retail and townhouses around the base. The project includes a garden space and improved traffic flow on Wood Street.

== History ==
The site was originally to host a building unrelated to the temple complex, but that project was cancelled when funding could not be obtained.

In July 2014, the project was approved by the Civic Design Review. As of January 2016, the building is under construction, with completion estimated to occur in 2017.

== Criticism ==
In February 2014, Inga Saffron, the architecture critic for The Philadelphia Inquirer praised the development for its "urbanism" but condemned the mismatched styles of the temple, meetinghouse, and apartment tower.

== See also ==
- List of tallest buildings in Philadelphia
- Philadelphia Pennsylvania Temple
