= Philadelphia Family Court =

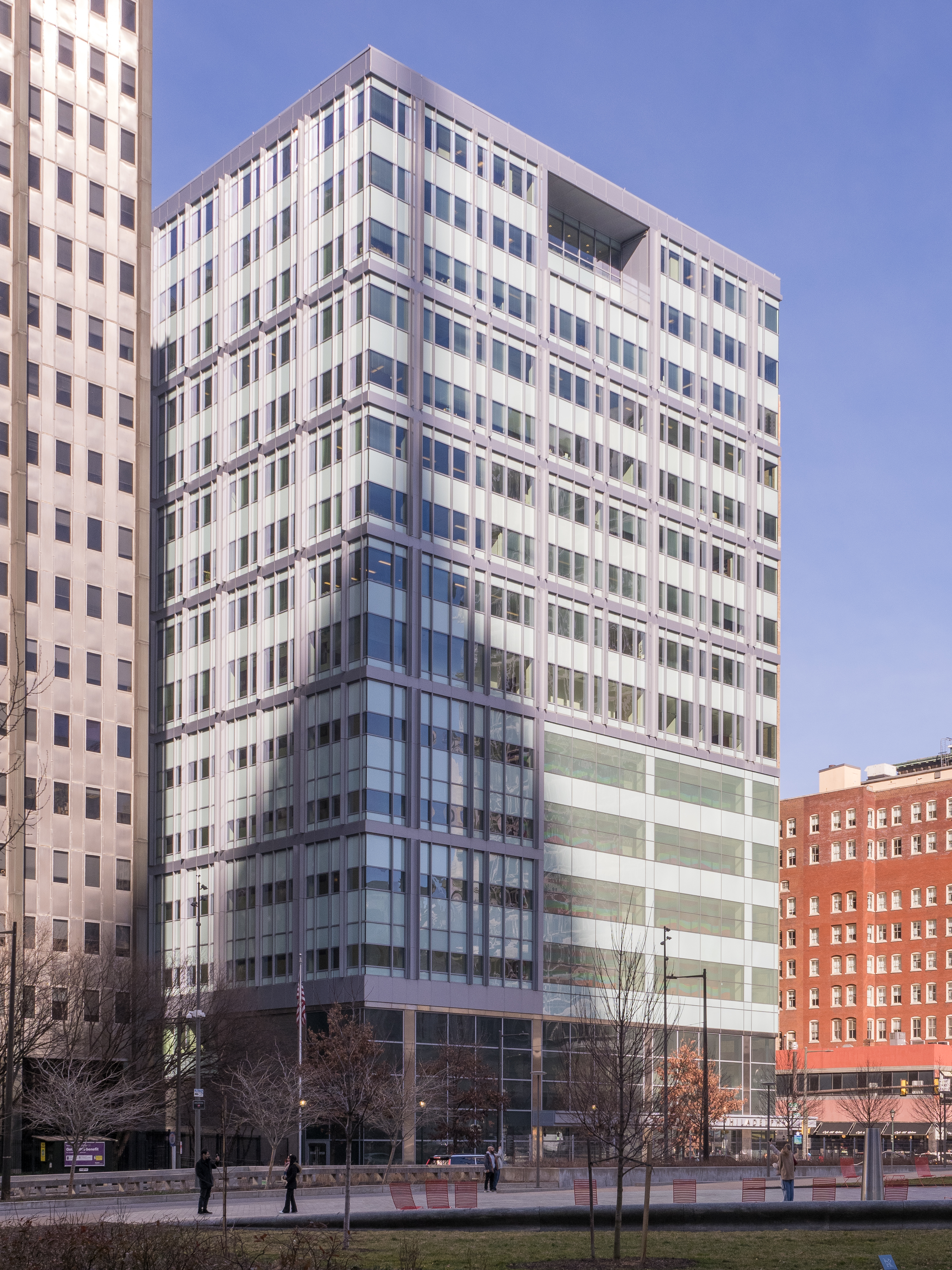

Court of Record overview
- Formed: 1914
- Jurisdiction: Philadelphia
- Headquarters: 1501 Arch St, Philadelphia, Pennsylvania 19102; 39.9551°N 75.1651°W
- Parent department: Judiciary of Pennsylvania

The Philadelphia Family Court is a specialized division of the Court of Common Pleas for Philadelphia County, Pennsylvania. The Family Court has jurisdiction in the proceedings of domestic relations and juvenile law enforcement within the First Judicial District of Pennsylvania.

== History ==
The Philadelphia Family Court system formed in 1914 and was known as the Juvenile and Domestic Branches of the Municipal Court. Between 1914 and 1939 the court processed $35,482,478 in claims which otherwise would have been charges to the city government. The charges range from $345,490 in 1914 to $1,565,682 in 1939.

On November 25, 1940, the Philadelphia Family Court system was moved to the historic Philadelphia Family Court Building on 1801 Vine Street in Logan Square. The building is located next to Parkway Central Library and was designed by John T. Windrim along with his chief designer, W. R. Morton Keast. The building was officially completed in 1941.

The Philadelphia Family Court again moved in 2014 to its current location on 1501 Arch Street leaving the former Family Court Building unoccupied.

== Judges ==
There are currently 25 judges working in the Family Division. The Deputy Court Administrators for the Juvenile Branch are led by Mario D'Adamo, Esquire, and Katherine T. Grasela.

Walter J. Olszewski is the supervising judge for cases involving domestic violence.
