= Family Law Act =

Family Law Act may refer to:

- Family Law Act 1975, Australia
- Family Law Act 1996, UK
- Family Law Act (Alberta), Canada
- Ontario Family Law Act, Canada

== See also ==
- Family law (disambiguation)
