= Jane Piper =

American painter

- Formal portrait, 1935
- Born: Jane Gibson Piper; August 21, 1916; Philadelphia, Pennsylvania
- Died: August 8, 1991 (aged 74); Philadelphia, Pennsylvania
- Resting place: The Woodlands (Philadelphia)
- Spouse(s): E. Digby Baltzell (1915–1996), American sociologist

Jane Gibson Piper (1916–1991) was an American artist known for her abstract treatment of still lifes. Building on the French modernist tradition of Matisse and Cézanne, she gave color precedence over representation. Shortly after her death a critic said "throughout her career Piper worked within a relatively narrow aesthetic range. She was interested in spatial organization and in creating space through color — concerns of another painter she admired, Henri Matisse. There's a sense of Matisse in her later work, but no indication that she was trying to imitate him; the resonance reflects shared concerns." From her first exhibition in 1943 through the end of her life she was given a total of thirty-four solo exhibitions in Philadelphia, New York, and other East Coast galleries and her works have been collected by major museums including the Philadelphia Museum of Art, the Pennsylvania Academy of the Fine Arts, the Brooklyn Museum, the National Academy of Design, The Phillips Collection, and the Carnegie Museum of Art.

== Early life and training ==
Piper was raised in a prosperous and well-connected Philadelphia family. At the age of nine she spent a year at a pension in Cannes where, observing an amateur artist at work, she became infatuated with painting and afterwards convinced her reluctant father to enroll her in an art class. (Note: Of this experience Piper later said: "I was nine years old, and we lived in a pension in Cannes with mostly retired English people. There was a Victorian type of woman from Scotland with high shoes. She went out every day and did watercolors. She never spoke to anybody. I figured that she was the lady I wanted to get to know. I'd hang around her, and later she let me go out with her painting. I'd sit and watch her do watercolors. At Christmas she gave me a sable brush and explained to me how to take care of it, how very valuable it was.") After a few years' study under the Philadelphia artist Grace Gemberling, she was able to study art as a boarder in a private school for girls, Westover School in Middlebury, Connecticut. Graduating in 1935, she returned to Philadelphia where she studied at the Pennsylvania Academy of the Fine Arts, first under Daniel Garber, whom she found to be too authoritarian, and then under Arthur Carles whose instruction she felt to be the most useful of all her teachers and whose artistic influence remained with her for the rest of her career. In 1936 she also enrolled for private study with the artist and collector Earl Horter. In his studio, her frequent close contact with paintings by Picasso, Braque, and Matisse made her aware of new possibilities in her own work. (Note: Largely self-educated, Earl Horter was an artist, printmaker, and collector whose acquisition of modernist art made his Philadelphia studio a valuable resource for budding artists such as Piper. In addition to the Europeans, Duchamp and Brancusi as well as the others mentioned, he acquired precisionist works by Sheeler as well as African sculpture and Native American artifacts.) The influence of French Modernism on her work was also enhanced by informal study in Paris in 1937 and periods of study in the Barnes collection in 1938. (Note: Regarding her time in the Barnes collection Piper later said, "I didn't know such paintings existed. I had seen some things that were involved with color abstraction, some Picassos and Bracques, but when I saw the Matisses I didn't know what hit me. The experience threw me into a whole new emotional world of color and feeling.") Three years later she spent the summer months at the school Hans Hofmann conducted in Provincetown, Massachusetts. (Note: In 1935 Piper befriended Moy Glidden in Daniel Garber's class in the Pennsylvania Academy of Fine Arts. The two frequently shared the same studio and attended the same classes until Glidden left Philadelphia in 1940. They both continued to study with Arthur Carles throughout this half decade and Piper remained close to Carles until his death in 1941.) Piper appreciated Hofmann's instruction but preferred Carles's. (Note: Of the two teachers Piper later wrote, "Carles and Hofmann understood each other very well, but Hofmann's method of teaching was so different from Carles. I felt I knew what Hofmann was talking about, but I did not understand the language he was using. I could have learned more from him than I did, but I thought Carles had said it all in simpler terms.")

=== Exhibitions and critical reception ===
Although Piper was a productive artist, fiercely devoted to her work, she had no need of income from sales and showed as frequently in non-commercial as commercial galleries. Her first appearance in a public exhibition occurred in 1931 when a painting of hers was included in a children's art show at a Philadelphia women's cultural organization called the Plastic Club. Grace Gemberling mounted the show to put works by her young students on display. Piper's contribution was in a set of pictures on the theme of jealousy. Reviewing the show, C. H. Bonte of The Philadelphia Inquirer found the work in general to be natural and spontaneous and the jealousy set in particular to be emotionally overwhelming.

Jane Piper, "Composition in Red," 1942–43, oil on masonite, 28 x 36 inches

Piper's unnamed and unsigned painting of 1942–43, called "Composition in Red," indicates the style of her work at the beginning of her professional career. During her career she participated in exhibitions held by non-commercial organizations included group and solo shows at the Philadelphia Art Alliance, Pennsylvania Academy of Fine Arts, Woodmere Art Museum, Philadelphia Arts Festival, Philadelphia Center for Architecture, Cheltenham Art Center, Wallingford Community Center, and galleries in Friends' Central School, Swarthmore College, Lehigh University and New York Studio School. (Note: Piper's paintings appeared in group and solo exhibitions of the Philadelphia Art Alliance in 1943, 1944, 1955, and 1967. She was shown at the Pennsylvania Academy of Fine Arts in 1945, 1947, 1953, 1956, and 1986. Other non-commercial appearances included the Friends' Central School (1943), Woodmere Art Museum (1983), Philadelphia Arts Festival (1962), Swarthmore College (1966), Lehigh University (1968), Philadelphia Center for Architecture (1971), Cheltenham Art Center (1986), Wallingford Community Arts Center (1986), and New York Studio School (1991).) A traveling exhibition, "Jane Piper: Retrospective Paintings, 1940–1985," was first mounted in James Madison University in 1985. In 1943 Piper was given her first appearance in a commercial gallery. Remarkably, this debut was a solo exhibition. The venue was the Robert Carlen Gallery in Philadelphia. She was given a second solo show at Carlen in 1959. Her first solo exhibition in a New York commercial gallery was at the Bonestell Gallery in 1947. Other commercial solo shows included the Dubin Gallery (Philadelphia, 1954), Parma Gallery (New York, 1958), Cherry Stone Gallery (Wellfleet, Mass., 1971), Bodley Gallery (New York, 1981), Mangel Gallery (Philadelphia, 1987), and Rising Tide Gallery (Wellfleet, Mass., 1990). Beginning in 1971, she also had eight solo exhibitions at the Gross-McCleaf Gallery in Philadelphia. Throughout the course of her career, Piper was given thirty-four solo exhibitions in commercial and non-commercial galleries in Philadelphia, New York, and Cape Cod.

Jane Piper, Untitled, 1961, oil on canvas, 28 x 34 inches

Piper's untitled painting of 1961 indicates the non-objective style of her work late in her career.

Critical reception of Piper's work was at first tepid but grew stronger as her career progressed. Reviewing her first show in 1943, a critic complained that the paintings were overly-abstract and decorative, "admirably adapted for the adornment of modern rooms." In 1956 her paintings received praise as "poetic light-filled abstractions." At the height of her career in 1983 a reviewer found that "her abiding lyrical connection with nature and the domestic environment, and pursuit of a unique, individual perception, place her firmly within a strong American tradition, although she remains spiritually separate from any trend or movement." A few years later she was recognized for an "original, daring approach" that was "firmly in the tradition of great American still life painting."

Jane Piper, "Fruit and Flowers," 1974, acrylic and charcoal on canvas, 40 x 60 inches

Piper's "Fruit and Flowers of 1974 shows her handling of objects in an abstract style.

In 1986 a curator who had organized a retrospective exhibition of her work wrote that "she retains a sense of wonder while developing ever new complex harmonies of form and color" and a reviewer, calling Piper one of Philadelphia's best artists, said her paintings "with her preference for yellow, orange and red tints and clear blues and greens, give an original picture of her domestic environment and nature's bounty and profuse growth." This critic continued: "Clearly, this gifted artist has had success creating a living and working environment that has a direct relationship to her creative life as an artist." In 2010, nineteen years after her death, Piper was called "one of Philadelphia's finest painters" and three years later she was called "one of Philadelphia's most prominent modernist painters."

=== Artistic style and working methods ===
Her technique is modern. She abstracts through color her own essence of still life. Yet what is interesting and fulfilling about her work is that her original, daring approach is firmly in the tradition of great American still life painting.

— Victoria Donohoe, "Hard Decisions That Pay Off in an Artist's Constructions," The Philadelphia Inquirer, October 17, 1986

In addition to the pervasive influence of her mentor Carles, Piper's early paintings were said to show the influence of Matisse and Cézanne. The influence of Carles and Matisse persisted as well in her late and final work. Color appears as the organizing principle in most of her paintings from the first to the last. Although constant reworking made it difficult to discern, her paintings were infrequently purely abstract. In fact she was primarily a still life painter and almost always used objects in her studio as a starting point for each work. Late in her career, a critic noted that her paintings were neither "abstract" nor "figurative," but something in between. She herself said, "I was never conscious of painting representationally or not painting representationally. I was always involved in spacial forms, which naturally lead you somewhat into abstraction. You have to handle your responses to what you're seeing. I was putting down what I saw and how I felt about what I found as connecting links."

In her work Piper wished to express her emotions rather than give a pictorial narrative. At the height of her career she responded to the poems of Wallace Stevens valuing the way in which they expressed emotions "in a moment's clarity of thought." (Note: Regarding the influence of Wallace Stevens on her work Piper said, "He's creating structure with the imagery. He, like Matisse, is searching for the right sensation, to recognize the completion of a work.")

In addition to rich colors, her mature work was noted for her use of white pigment, which she used as negative space in order to better define her subjects. She was said, like Matisse, to be "interested in spatial organization and in creating space through color," and a critic appreciated her late paintings for the "space structured by color, using still-life motifs" that they conveyed. Early in her career most of Piper's paintings were made in oil on canvas. Later, she mainly used acrylic colors which she liked because of the quality of the whites. The shorter drying time was also important to her as she repainted continually as her paintings evolved.

A private person who worked in solitude, she worked intensely, believing, as Carles had maintained, that in painting "you put everything in your life into it." Speaking of students she had taught, she said it took more than just talent to sustain a professional career: "You must be able to tolerate yourself for long periods of time, working in the isolation of a studio." She was unusually disciplined and rarely took time off. Despite family responsibilities (raising two daughters and moving the family about as her husband's career evolved), she once said a six-month hiatus was the longest time she had spent out of the studio. "Observers should feel that the act of painting was effortless – that it happened, it just happened," she said in a 1977 magazine interview. "Which of course," she added, "is not true." A few years later she said, "Painting is a pleasure, even though painful. It will always be a pleasure for me, because it is the thing I want to do the most."

== Collections ==
Piper's paintings are held in the permanent collections of the Philadelphia Museum of Art, Pennsylvania Academy of Fine Arts, Brooklyn Museum, Carnegie Museum of Art, National Academy of Design, Phillips Collection, Provincetown Art Museum, Mount Holyoke College Art Museum, and Woodmere Art Museum.

== Art teacher ==
She taught painting and drawing at the Philadelphia Museum of Art in the mid-1950s. From 1956 to 1985 she taught at the Philadelphia College of Art. She also taught at the Pennsylvania Academy and the New York Studio School. Of her teaching method she said, "In teaching I relate to the students one to one. I try to wait until they've done something, and then I talk to them about what they've done. I think they get much more from the setups or from looking at other paintings than they do from a lecture."

== Personal life and family ==
Piper was born in Philadelphia on August 21, 1916. Her father was Edmund B. Piper and her mother Elizabeth Gibson Piper. They were married in 1906 and settled in Williamsport, Pennsylvania. Her grandparents on her father's side were members of an old and prominent family of Watsontown and neighboring Williamsport. On her mother's side her grandparents were prosperous Williamsport merchants. Edmund B. Piper was a well-known obstetrician and gynecologist who gained recognition for a forceps he designed (and which bears his name). Elizabeth Gibson Piper led an active social life, her name appearing frequently in the society columns of The Philadelphia Inquirer. Piper had two older sisters, Helen E. and Eleanor L. Piper. In 1925, Piper's mother and the three girls, aged eighteen, fifteen, and nine, spent the winter in France and it was there, at a pension in Cannes, that Piper decided she would become an artist. During the winter of 1933–34, following the elaborate activities required for the introduction to society of Helen and Eleanor as well as Helen's marriage to Henry B. Coxe, Piper's mother again took the three daughters to France. In the meantime, the three had been names as principal beneficiaries in the will of a wealthy maiden aunt, Elizabeth L. Piper, each to receive $30,000 on their eighteenth birthdays, and Piper had become a boarding student at Westover School in Middlebury, Connecticut. In February 1935 Piper's father died at the age of fifty-four, in May she graduated from Westover, and in November she was honored as a débutante when a Bachrach portrait appeared in the society pages of The Philadelphia Inquirer. During the remaining years of the 1930s she was an active participant in Philadelphia society, participating in a charity ball, being a bridesmaid in wedding ceremonies, joining the Junior League, and entertaining friends at her mother's summer place in Eagles Mere.

Piper was twenty-six when she married a Navy aviation cadet, E. Digby Bartzell Jr., in the winter of 1943. His family, like hers, was prominent in Philadelphia society and, like her, he had attended prestigious private boarding school. Subsequently, he had obtained Ivy League undergraduate and graduate degrees and, following service as a military intelligence officer in the South Pacific, had become a highly respected professor of sociology. (Note: When he retired from the University of Pennsylvania, Baltzell received praise as "both inventor and exemplar" in his field. Called "a man of contradictions," he was called anti-egalitarian but also liberal in political affiliation, a member of the social elite but also a critic of the white Anglo-Saxon Protestant establishment which, he wrote, "has too often placed the desire for material comfort and security above the duties of political and intellectual leadership." He is remembered as the person who popularized the initialism "WASP.")

Piper kept her maiden name for professional uses and her married name for other uses. She and Baltzell had two daughters, Eve, born in 1944, and Jan, born in 1948. (Note: Eve became an architect and Jan a professional artist, like her mother.) Following his discharge from the Navy in 1945, the young family moved from place to place as Baltzell's career evolved. (Note: In 1945 the family moved from Philadelphia to New York where Baltzell studied for and achieved a Ph.D. in 1947. When he began teaching at the University of Pennsylvania, they returned to Philadelphia (1947) and then settled in Radnor, Pennsylvania (1948). Their daughters having grown up and Piper being able to devote more time to painting, they moved back to Philadelphia in 1966 where they remained the rest of their lives.) In 1963 Piper and Baltzell began spending summers in Wellfleet on Cape Cod and two years later, having bought a house there, Piper built a studio on the property.

Piper died on August 8, 1991, at age 74, and was buried in Philadelphia's Woodlands Cemetery. Baltzell died in Boston at age 80 on August 17, 1996.
