= Family law (disambiguation) =

Family law is an area of the law that deals with family matters and domestic relations.

Family Law may also refer to:

- Family Law (American TV series), a 1999–2002 American family and legal drama television drama
- Family Law (Canadian TV series), a Canadian drama television series that premiered in 2021
- Family Law (film), a 2006 film
- The Family Law, a 2016–2019 Australian television comedy/drama

== See also ==
- Family Law Act (disambiguation)
- Family court (disambiguation)
