= E. Digby Baltzell =

American sociologist (1915–1996)

- Born: Edward Digby Baltzell Jr. November 14, 1915; Philadelphia, Pennsylvania, U.S.
- Died: August 17, 1996 (aged 80); Boston, Massachusetts, U.S.
- Occupation: professor

Academic background
- Education: Columbia University; University of Pennsylvania; St. Paul's School

Academic work
- Discipline: Social and Behavioral Sciences
- Sub-discipline: Psychological Sciences
- Institutions: University of Pennsylvania; Princeton Theological Seminary; Harvard University

Edward Digby Baltzell Jr. (November 14, 1915 – August 17, 1996) was an American sociologist, academic and author. He studied the White Anglo-Saxon Protestant establishment and is credited with popularizing the acronym WASP. He was also a best-selling author whose books were popular with both scholars and the general public.

== Early life ==
Baltzell was born in Philadelphia, to a wealthy family of Episcopalians. His parents were Carolina Adelaide "Lena" Duhring and Edward Digby Baltzell, an insurance broker. His maternal grandfather was Rev. Dr. H. Louis Duhring of Chestnut Hill, Philadelphia. His paternal grandfather was Henry Eaton Baltzell of Baltimore, Maryland and Wyncote, Pennsylvania. He was raised in the Chestnut Hill section of Philadelphia. Baltzell said, "We always thought we were totally broke, but we were really in the top one-tenth of one per cent; I always thought we didn't have any money. But as I look back, I led a really privileged life."

He attended St. Paul's School, an Episcopal boarding school in Concord, New Hampshire, graduating in 1935. However, his father lost his job due to alcoholism in Baltzell's senior year. Unable to afford Harvard or Yale or Princeton, he attended the University of Pennsylvania, paying for his tuition with a scholarship and worked at Franklin Field where he collected tickets, ushered, and parked cars. He studied architecture and was a member of the literary fraternity St. Anthony Hall. He was also captain of the freshman tennis team and played on the squash team.

In the summer of 1937, he worked at the Northeast Harbor Tennis Club and its swimming club in Mount Desert Island, Maine, arranging tournaments and other activities at both clubs. When his father was arrested for insurance fraud in 1938 (although Baltzell would later tell people his father had died), Baltzell lacked the funds for tuition and dropped out to work as a salesman at Wanamaker's Department Store. A friend loaned him $200 to return to Penn, and he graduated with a B.S. from the Wharton School of Business in 1939.

After graduating, he took a job as an underwriter, followed by working as a pharmaceutical salesman. During World War II, he joined the U.S. Navy, serving as a naval aviator and air combat intelligence officer in the Pacific theater. The war was a pivotal moment in creating Batlzell's world view; he said, "War was the great equalizer, the melting pot. You couldn't share the hardships, the dangers and boredom with people of all races and backgrounds and then turn around and exclude them from opportunities to which they were entitled."

He earned his Ph.D. in sociology from Columbia University in 1952. There, he studied under Paul Lazarsfeld, Robert Staughton Lynd, Robert Morrison MacIver, Robert K. Merton, and C. Wright Mills. Baltzell realized that his background made him different from others in the field of sociology which was dominated by people from the middle class. However, this also meant that the upper class was an understudied topic. He decided to write his dissertation on the American upper class, and "for the rest of his life remained the world’s foremost authority on it." Baltzell's developed his class theory from Max Weber and Alexis de Tocqueville, rejecting a Marxist framework.

== Career ==
Baltzell taught at a branch of Pennsylvania State University. He joined the faculty of sociology at the University of Pennsylvania in 1947. He said, "It was good to be born rich, because if you’re rich, you have freedom. But if you can’t be born rich, then the next best thing is to be a professor."

In his most influential book, The Protestant Establishment (1964), he asserted, "…While socialist faiths might aim for a classless society, the United States stressed equality of opportunity in an open class system." This book also introduced the term WASP in the book's tables. Baltzell explained, "How was I going to fit those words in the little boxes?″ It was easier to just fit 'WASP' in there."

Although he preferred aristocratic leadership in society, his views were liberal. In the 1960s, Baltzell stated, "The existing elites must assimilate talented black leaders into a national aristocracy." He also believed that the Protestant aristocracy of the American upper class had damaged the country by failing to allow talented members of other groups, especially minorities and Jews, into their class. He also spoke well of women: "Throughout history, great men have tended both to have had mothers who were socially, morally, or intellectually superior to their husbands and also to have chosen as wives women who were well above them in one way or another.... Of all the thirty-nine presidents [as of 1980]…only Nixon, Ford, and Carter married beneath themselves."

Frank Furstenberg, a University of Pennsylvania sociology professor, said, "He felt the best of WASP culture represented the best virtues to which everyone could aspire: honor, hard work, respect, authority. Those with privilege must work to share it and have an obligation to those without privilege."

In his book Puritan Boston and Quaker Philadelphia (1979), Baltzell concluded that the Quakers in Philadelphia were less effective than the Protestants of Boston because of their traditions of modesty and egalitarianism.

Baltzell was the Danforth Fellow at the Society for Religion in Higher Education of the Princeton Theological Seminary from 1967 to 1968. He was also a Charles Warren Research Fellow at Harvard University from 1972 to 1973, and Guggenheim Fellow from 1978 to 1979.

Baltzell retired from the University of Pennsylvania in 1986, and became Emeritus Professor of history and sociology.

== Professional affiliations ==
In 1994, he was elected a Fellow of the American Academy of Arts and Sciences. He belonged to the American Sociology Association, the American Studies Association, and the Historical Society of Pennsylvania.

== Publications ==
=== Nonfiction books ===
- Philadelphia Gentlemen: The Making of a National Upper Class (Routledge, 1958) ISBN 978-0887387890
- American Business Aristocracy (Collier Books, 1962)
- The Protestant Establishment: Aristocracy and Caste in America (Yale University Press, 1964) ISBN 978-0300038187
- Puritan Boston and Quaker Philadelphia: Two Protestant Ethics and the Spirit of Class Authority and Leadership (Free Press, 1979) ISBN 9780029013205
- The Protestant Establishment Revisited (New Brunswick, 1991) ISBN 9780887384196
- Judgment and Sensibility: Religion and Stratification (Routledge, 1994) ISBN 978-1560000488
- Sporting Gentlemen: Men's Tennis from the Age of Honor to the Cult of the Superstar (Free Press, 1995) ISBN 978-0029013151

== Awards and honors ==
- 2015: A carved stone gargoyle in Digby's likeness was placed at the University of Pennsylvania's Quadrangle dormitory before the centennial of his birth.
- 2010: The library in the University of Pennsylvania St. Anthony Hall chapter house was upgraded and renamed Digby Baltzell Library in his honor.
- 1989: Honorary Degree, University of Pennsylvania
- 1985: Ira Abrams Award for Distinguished Teaching, School of Arts and Sciences, University of Pennsylvania
- 1981 & 1996: His papers are maintained at the University Archives & Records Center at the University of Pennsylvania
- 1981: Alumni Award of Merit, University of Pennsylvania
- 1981: Honorary Degree, La Salle College
- 1979: Athenaeum Literary Award, Athenaeum of Philadelphia – for Puritan Boston and Quaker Philadelphia

== Personal life ==
Baltzell married the artist and debutante Jane Gibson Piper in 1943. She was the daughter of Dr. and Mrs. Edmund B. Piper of Philadelphia. They had two daughters, Eve and Jan Baltzell. She died in 1991. He married his second wife, Jocelyn Carlson, in 1993.

He lived on Delancey Place in Philadelphia, Pennsylvania and had a summer home in Wellfleet, Massachusetts. An expert on the history of social register clubs, he chose to be a member of only one, The Franklin Inn Club in Philadelphia. He said, I never belonged to any club, because they're all anti-Semitic, except one. I used to belong to the Franklin Inn Club for intellectuals."

In 1996, he died of a heart attack at the Brigham and Women's Hospital in Boston at the age of 80 years.
