= W. R. Morton Keast =

American architect

- Born: William Richard Morton Keast; May 31, 1888; Philadelphia, Pennsylvania, US
- Died: May 23, 1973 (aged 84); Montgomery County, Pennsylvania, US
- Resting place: West Laurel Hill Cemetery, Bala Cynwyd
- Occupation: Architect
- Notable work: Family Court Building; Wells Fargo Building
- Spouse(s): Susette Inloes Schultz Keast (1st wife); Grace Gemberling (2nd wife)
- Children: 2 with Susette Inloes Schultz Keast

William Richard "W. R." Morton Keast (May 31, 1888 – May 23, 1973) was an American architect from Philadelphia, Pennsylvania. He was the chief designer of famed architect John T. Windrim. Keast began construction of the Philadelphia Family Court Building in 1938.

== Early life ==
Keast was born in Philadelphia on May 31, 1888, to Emma and Richard Henry Keast. He graduated from Northeast Manual Training School and entered University of Pennsylvania, but left in 1904 without graduating. During his summer vacation he worked for Cope and Stewardson and was later employed by Paul P. Cret and Albert Kelsey assisting on the design for the Pan American Union Building located in Washington, D.C.

== Career ==
In 1910, Keast began his long time employment with John T. Windrim. He assisted with various projects including the design of Franklin Institute, the Wells Fargo Building and several Bell Telephone buildings. Windrim died in 1934, Keast began construction on the Family Court Building in 1938 based on Windrim's original design. The building was officially completed in 1941.

== Personal life ==
Keast married his first wife Susette Inloes Schultz Keast. They had 2 children, Collette and Laurette. Susette died in 1932. Keast remarried in the late 1930s to Grace Gemberling. Gemberling stayed with Keast until his death. They had no children.

== Death ==
Keast died in Montgomery County, Pennsylvania, on May 23, 1973, at the age of 84. He is buried at West Laurel Hill Cemetery.
