= Susette Schultz Keast =

American painter

- Born: Susette Inloes Schultz; August 6, 1892; Philadelphia, Pennsylvania
- Died: September 5, 1932 (aged 40); West Chester, Pennsylvania
- Known for: Painting
- Movement: Pennsylvania Impressionists
- Spouse: W. R. Morton Keast (m. 1919)

Susette Inloes Schultz Keast (August 6, 1892 – September 5, 1932) was an American painter. She was a member of the Philadelphia Ten.

== Biography ==
Keast was born in 1892 in Philadelphia, Pennsylvania.

She attended the Philadelphia School of Design, and the Pennsylvania Academy of the Fine Arts. Her instructors included Henry B. Snell, Elliott Daingerfield, Hugh H. Breckenridge, Thomas Pollock Anshutz and William Merritt Chase. In 1911 she received a Cresson European Scholarship from the Pennsylvania Academy of the Fine Arts which allowed her summer travel to Europe.

Keast married the architect W. R. Morton Keast in 1919. They subsequently travel to China and Japan.

In 1922 the Pennsylvania Academy of the Fine Arts purchased her painting Inner Harbor.

In 1930 Keast replaced Cora S. Brooks as a member of the Philadelphia Ten. Keast was also a member of The Plastic Club and the North Shore Art Association.

She died suddenly in 1932 in West Chester, Pennsylvania.

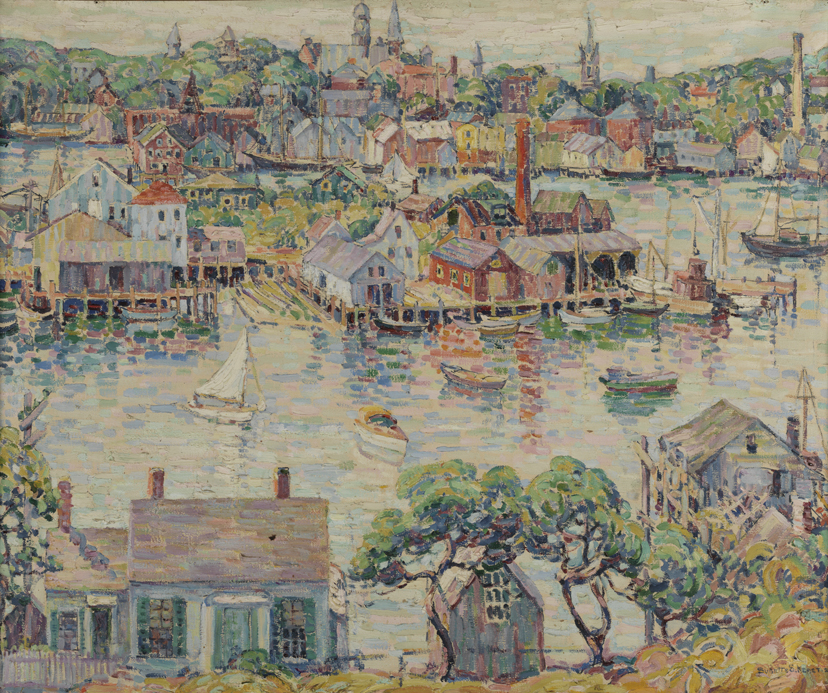
Inner Harbor by Susette Schultz Keast, 1922

== Legacy ==
Keast's work was included in the 1998 retrospective, "The Philadelphia Ten" at the Moore College of Art & Design.
