= Family Court Building =

- U.S. National Register of Historic Places
- U.S. National Historic Landmark
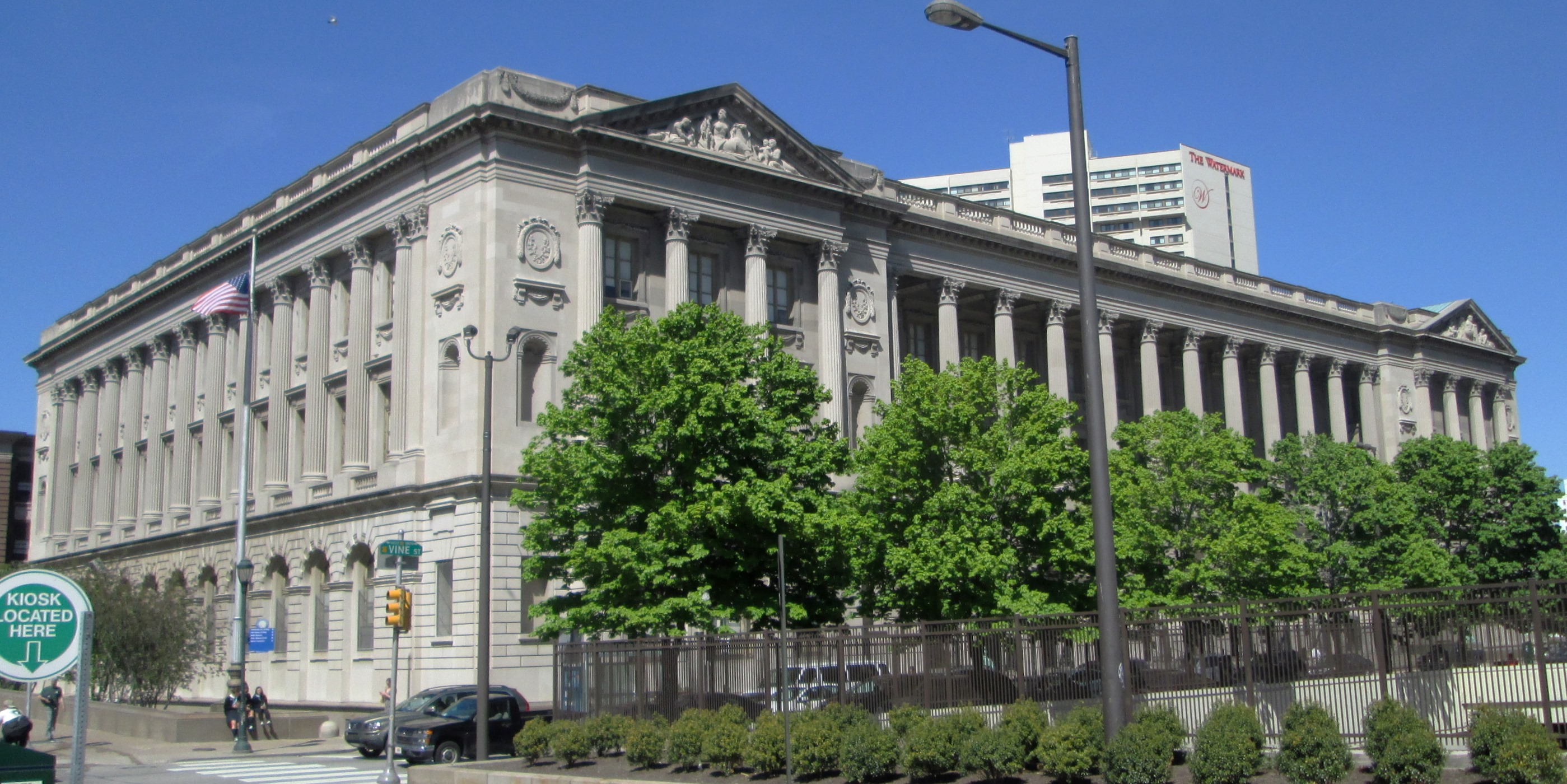
- Family Court Building in Logan Circle

- Location within Philadelphia Location within Pennsylvania Location within the United States
- Location: 1801 Vine Street, Philadelphia, Pennsylvania 19103
- Coordinates: 39.9593°N 75.1695°W
- Built: November 25, 1940
- Architect: John T. Windrim; W. R. Morton Keast
- NRHP reference No.: 14000097
- Added to NRHP: March 31, 2014

The Philadelphia Family Court Building, also known as Juvenile and Domestic Branches of the Municipal Court, is a historic building in Center City Philadelphia and registered under National Park Service's, National Register of Historic Places.

The building was constructed between 1938 and 1941 and was occupied on November 25, 1940 by the Juvenile and Domestic Branches of the Municipal Court, later known as the Philadelphia Family Court. In 2014, the Philadelphia Family Court moved to a new location on Arch Street. As of 2017, the building remains unoccupied. In 2020, the City of Philadelphia rescinded a contract with The Peebles Corporation to renovate the building after years of delay.

On August 11, 2022, the City of Philadelphia announced that it would redevelop the Family Court Building to house the African American Museum in Philadelphia.

== History ==
The building design follows neoclassical architecture. The Family Court Building and the adjacent Parkway Central Library are replicas of the Hôtel de Crillon and the Hôtel de la Marine located on Paris's Place de la Concorde. Both buildings closely follow their French counterpart's placement on Logan Circle. The building was designed by John T. Windrim and constructed by his chief designer W. R. Morton Keast.

Construction began on September 17, 1938, and the cornerstone was laid on June 20, 1939. The building opened on 1801 Vine Street. According to National Park Service, the building was completed in 1941; however, William Richard Morton Keast states the building was completed and occupied by November 25, 1940.

In 1971, Family Court Building was accepted into the Philadelphia Register of Historic Places. On March 31, 2014, the Family Court Building was accepted into the National Register of Historic Places.

The building housed the Philadelphia Family Court from 1941 to 2014. Three stories and the ground level were opened to the public. The building was used as a juvenile court as well as a court for domestic issues.

The building is known for its murals and has been described by Ben Leech, director of advocacy at the Preservation Alliance for Greater Philadelphia, as "a virtual museum of New Deal art".

Plans had been made by the city to move the Philadelphia Family Court closer to Market Street. In 2014, the Peebles Corporation made a bid to turn the courthouse into a museum and boutique hotel. The Philadelphia Family Court moved to a new location at 1501 Arch Street, leaving the Family Court Building unoccupied.

In November, 2020, The Peebles Corporation's contract to purchase 1801 Vine Street was cancelled by the City of Philadelphia. The City cited the impacts of the COVID-19 pandemic on the hospitality industry as the main reason for cancelling Peebles's development bid. Peebles Corporation CEO, Roy Donahue Peebles, said in a statement that the company was “surprised and disappointed by the action". At the time Peebles bid was cancelled, the project had taken over 7 years without any construction, financing, or tenants put in place.

On August 11, 2022, It was announced that the Family Court would house the relocation of the African American Museum in Philadelphia and some offices for the Free Library of Philadelphia. The Former Home of the museum was on Arch Street.

== See also ==
- Parkway Central Library
- Benjamin Franklin Parkway
