= Vine Street (Philadelphia) =

Street in Philadelphia, United States of America

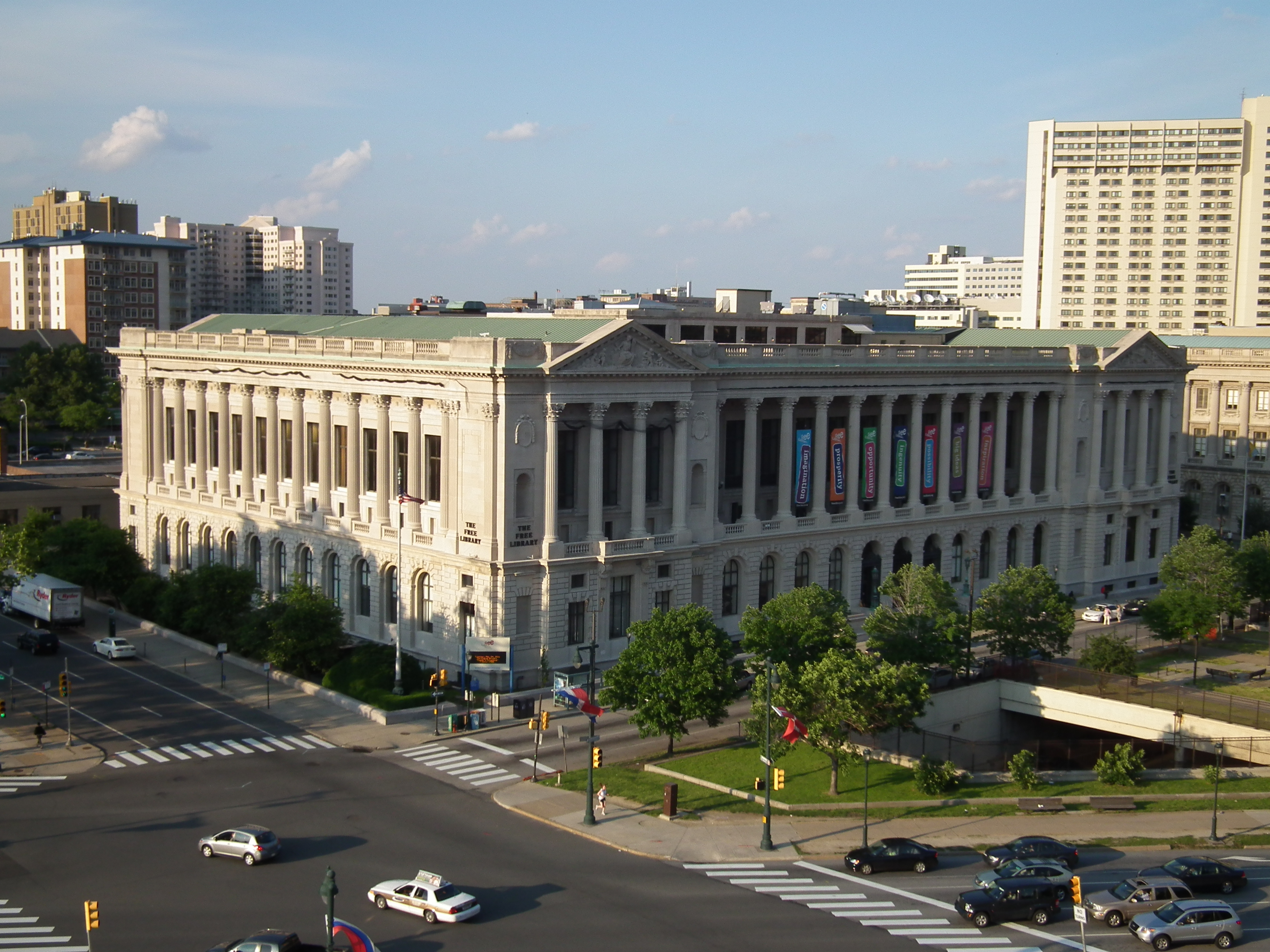
- The Free Library of Philadelphia at 1901 Vine Street
- Location: Philadelphia, Pennsylvania, U.S.
- West end: Daggett Street in Haddington
- East end: Letitia Street in Old City

Construction
- Commissioned: 1682

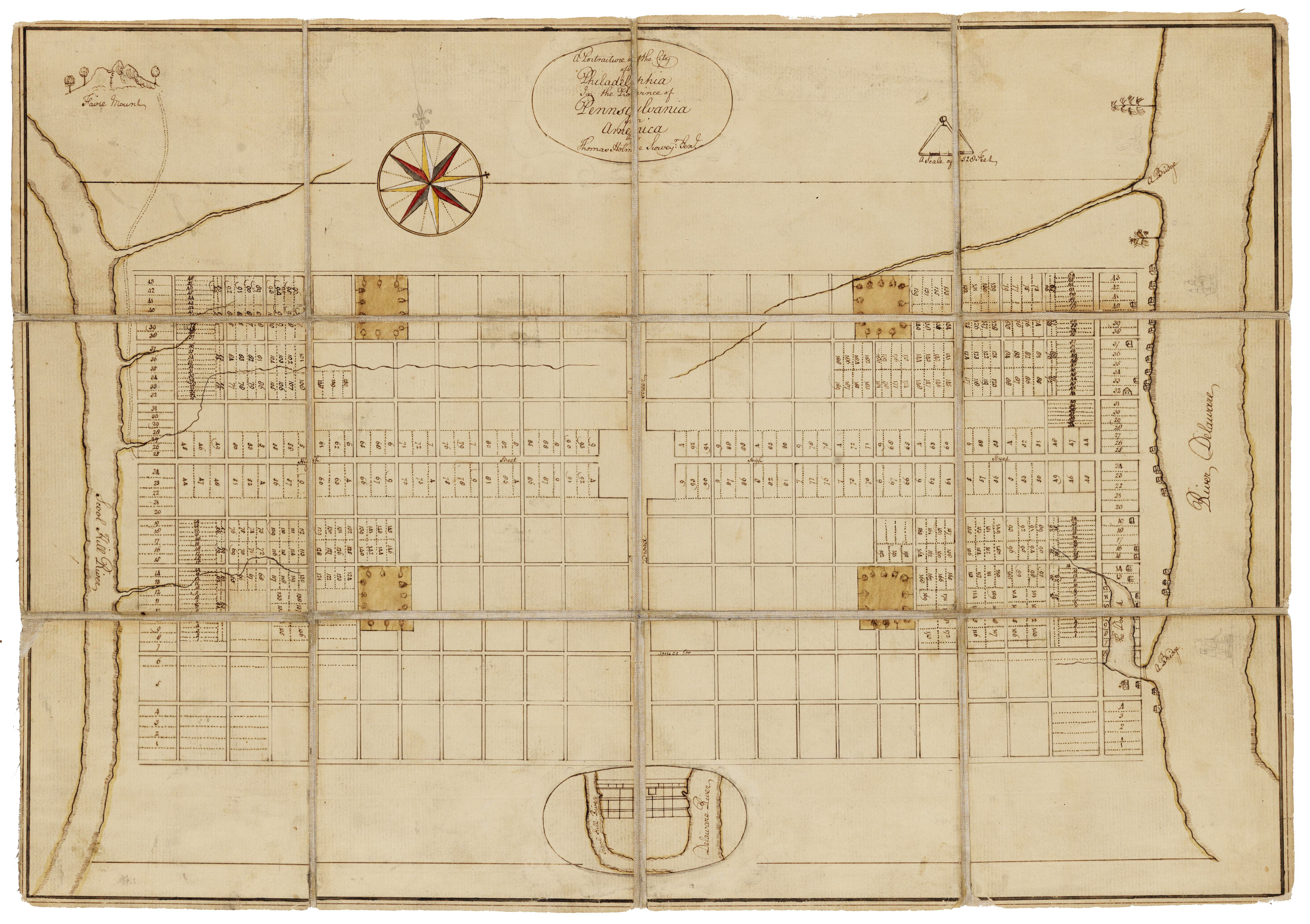
Thomas Holme's 1683 original street plan of Philadelphia, including Vine Street (at top)

Vine Street is a major east-west street in Center City Philadelphia. It begins at the Delaware River and proceeds west to 20th Street, where it merges with the Benjamin Franklin Parkway.

In West Philadelphia, it begins again near the intersection of 52nd Street and Haverford Avenue and ends just past 66th Street in Cobbs Creek Park. Vine Street is non-continuous between 5th and 7th Streets because of the Vine Street Expressway and the approach to Benjamin Franklin Bridge, which connects Center City Philadelphia with Camden, New Jersey.

It was part of Philadelphia's original street plan, laid out by William Penn and Thomas Holme in 1682, and remained the northern border of the City of Philadelphia until 1854.

It forms the northern border of Franklin Square and Logan Circle. Parkway Central Library, the main branch of the Free Library of Philadelphia system, and the now-vacant Family Court Building both have their main entrances on Vine Street.

== In popular culture ==
Vine Street is referenced in the song "Beat Up Guitar" on Zig Zag, a 1989 album by The Hooters.

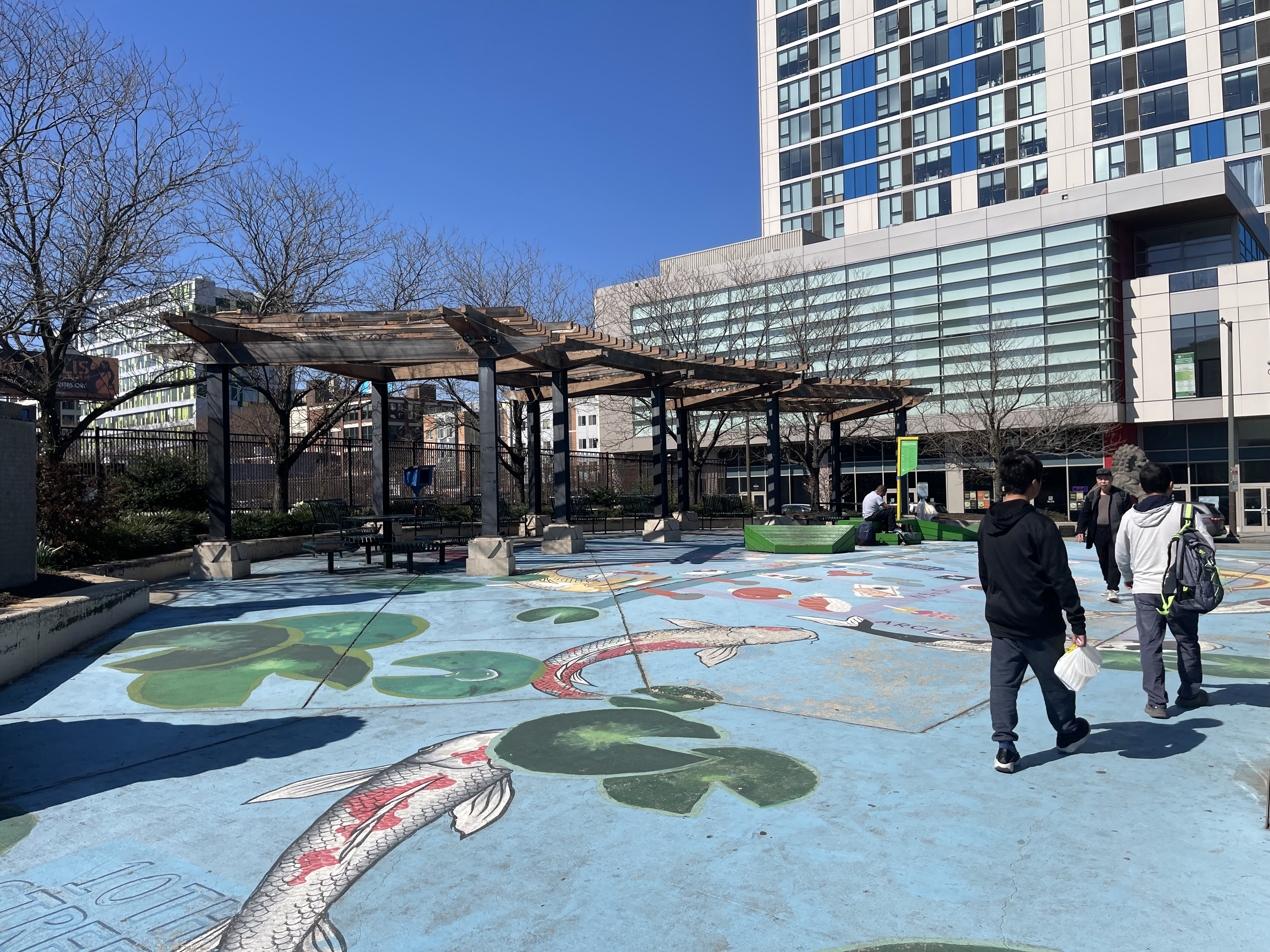
Vine Street decorations in Chinatown

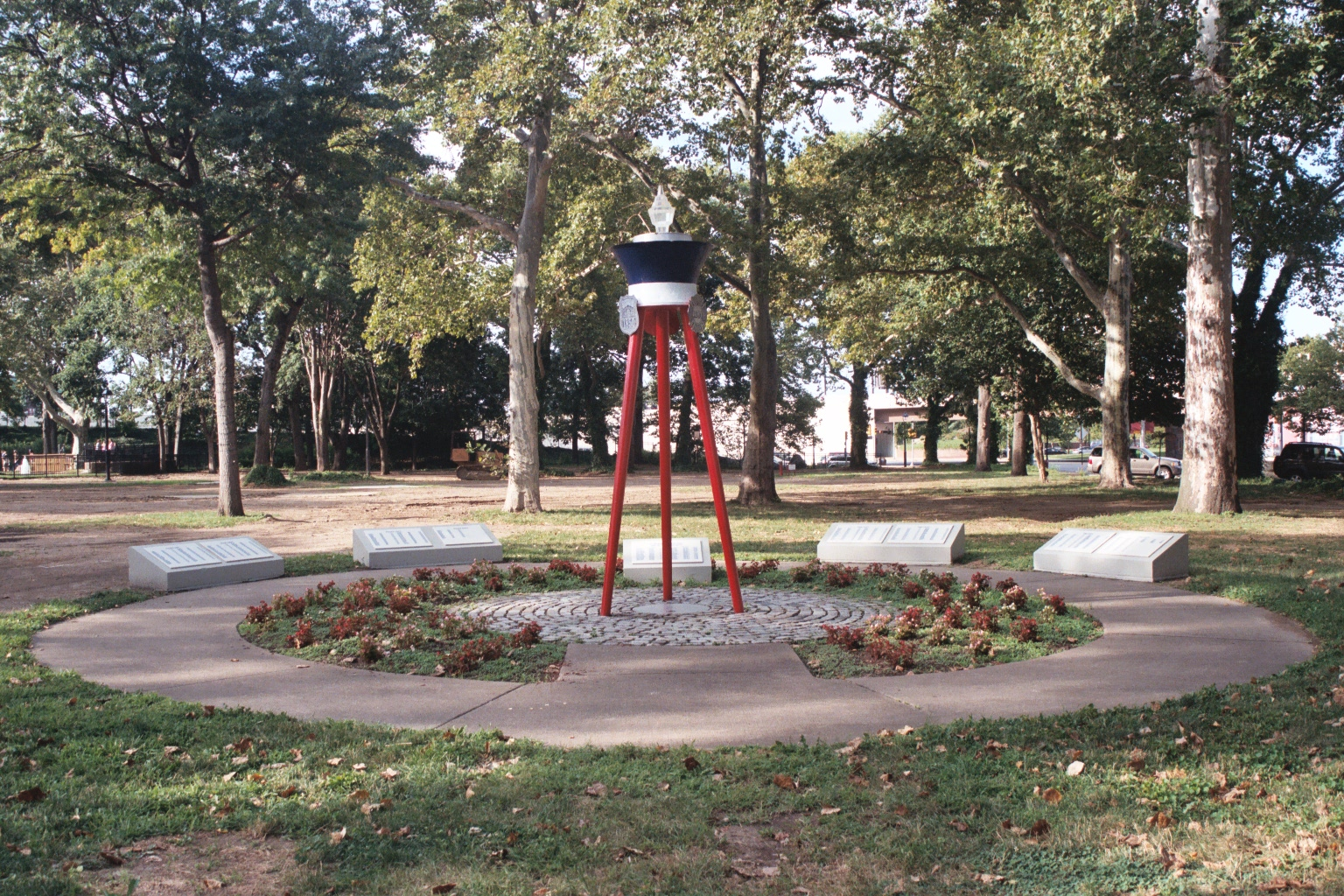
Philadelphia Fire Department Memorial at Franklin Square with Vine Street is in the background

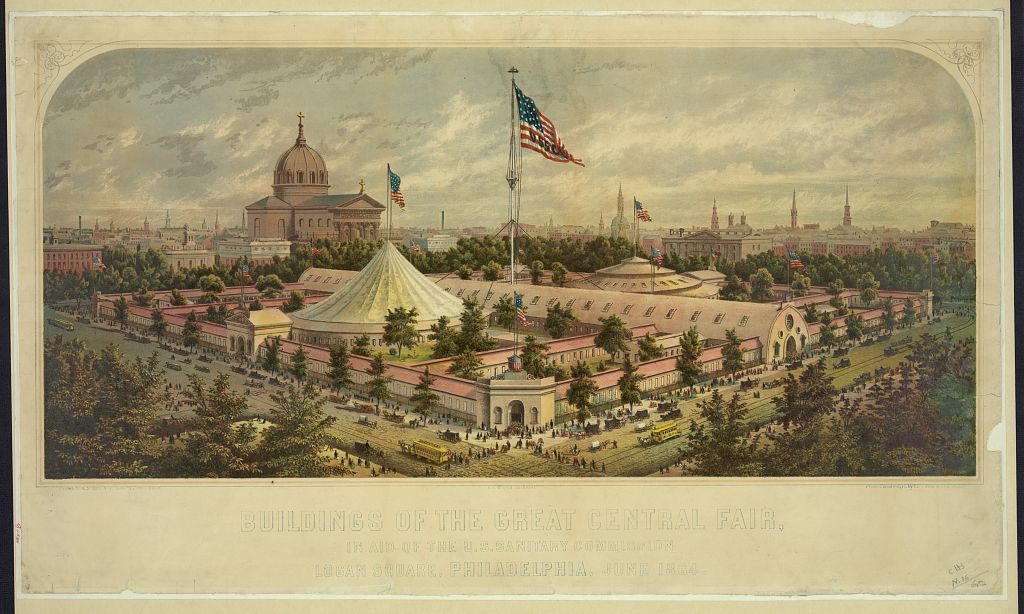
Great Sanitary Fair, Logan Square (now Logan Circle) with Vine Street is in the foreground in June 1864

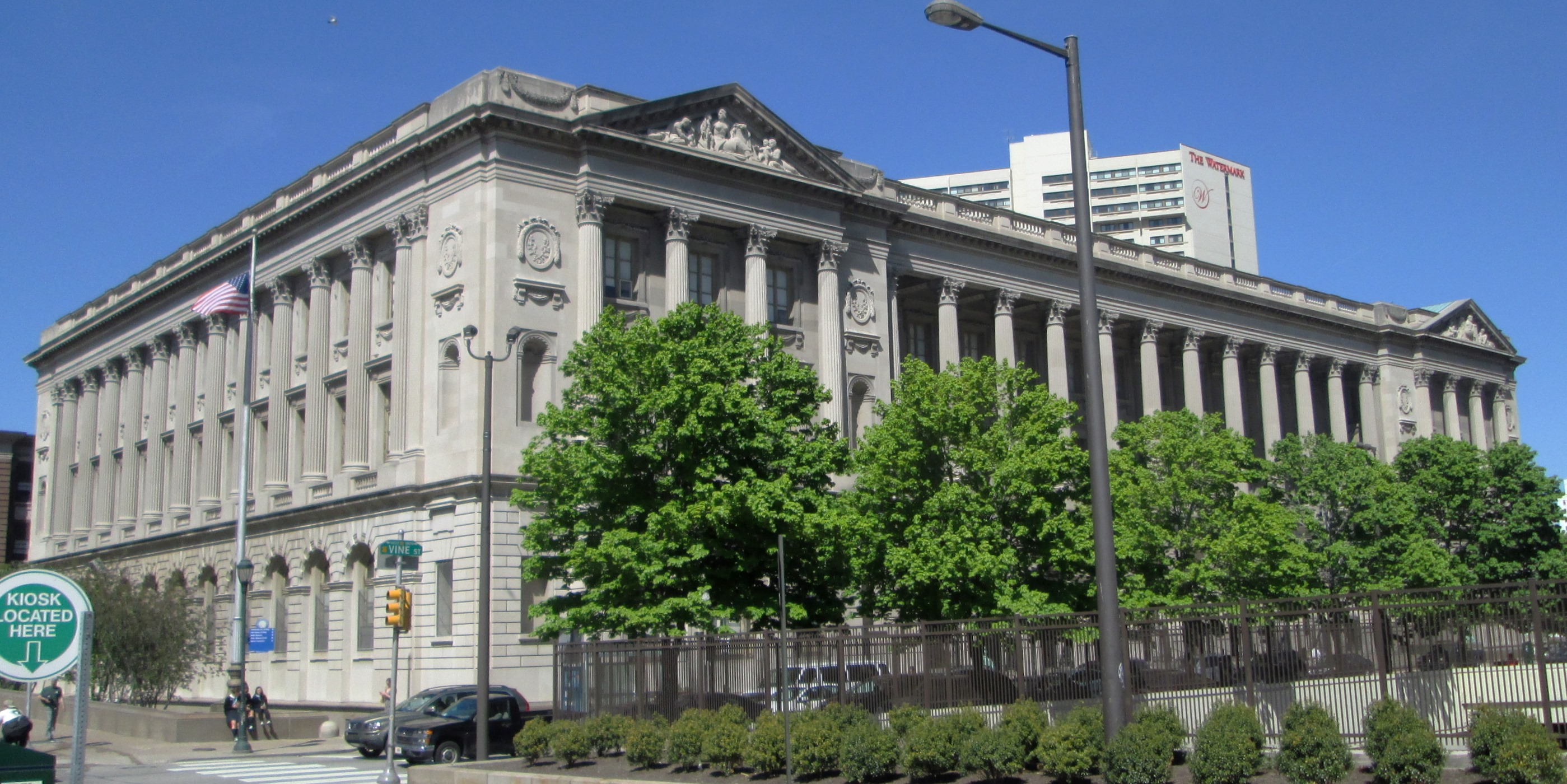
Family Court Building at 1801 Vine Street

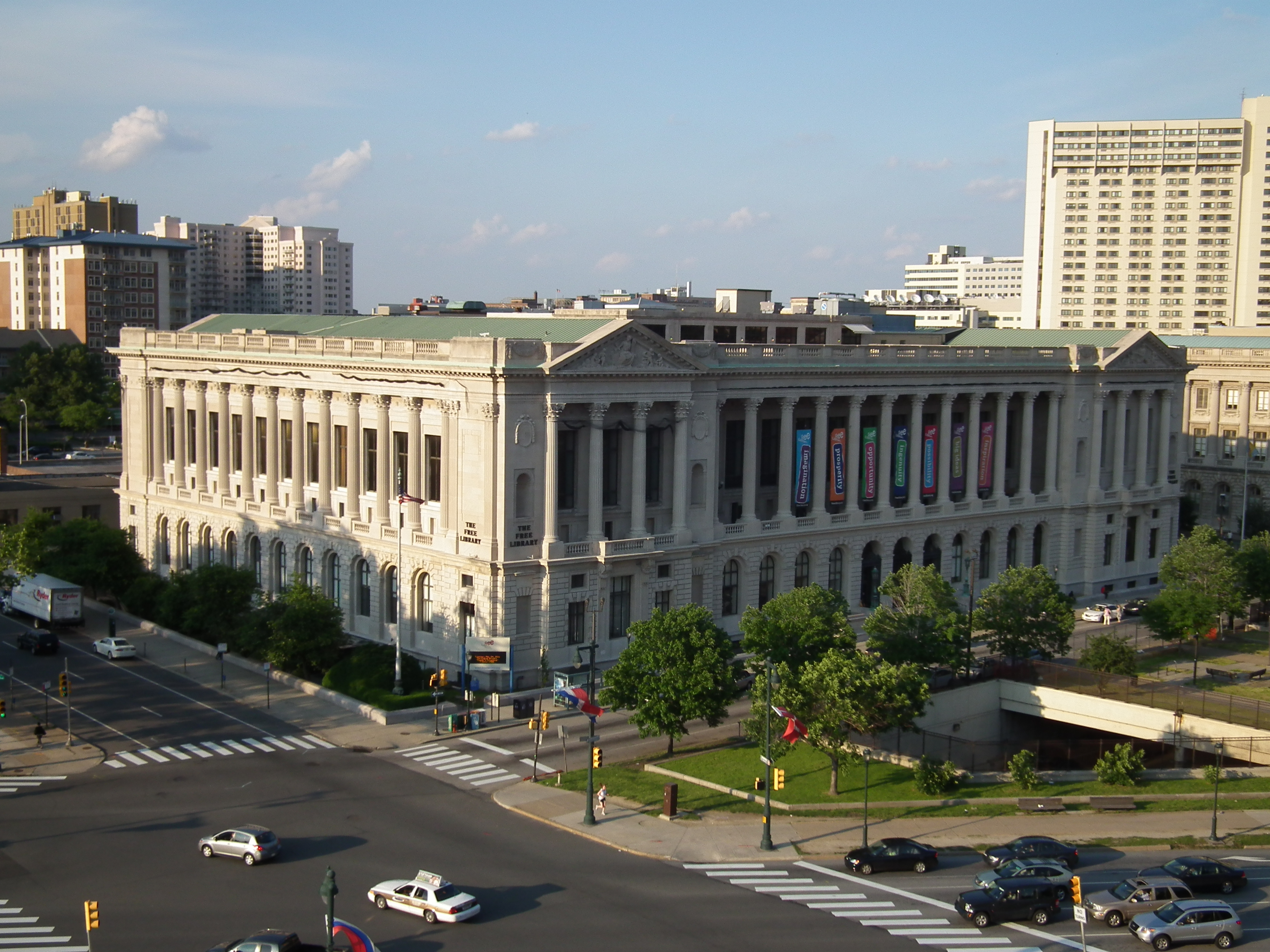
Parkway Central Library at 1901 Vine Street

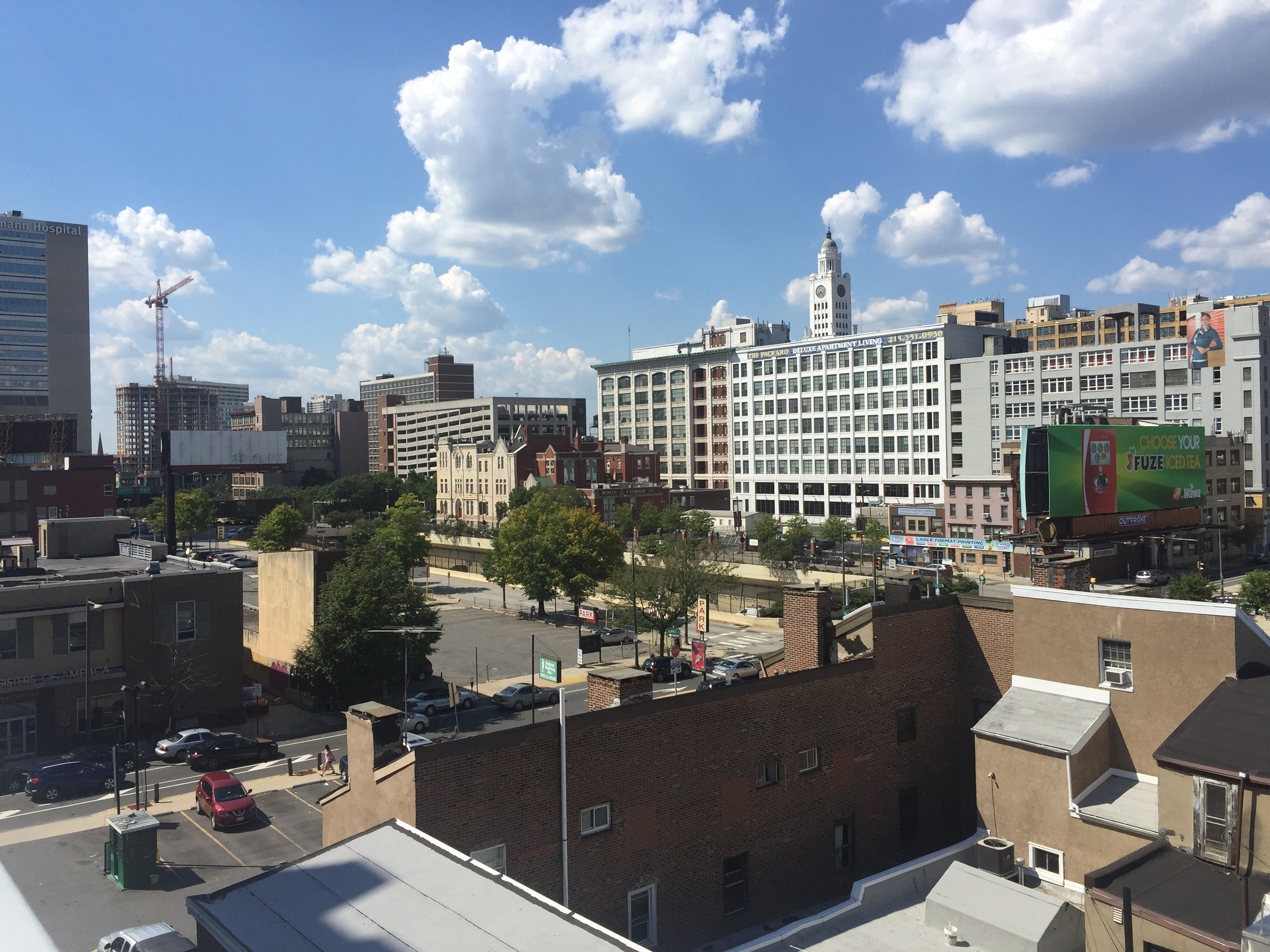
Vine Street between 12th and 13th Streets

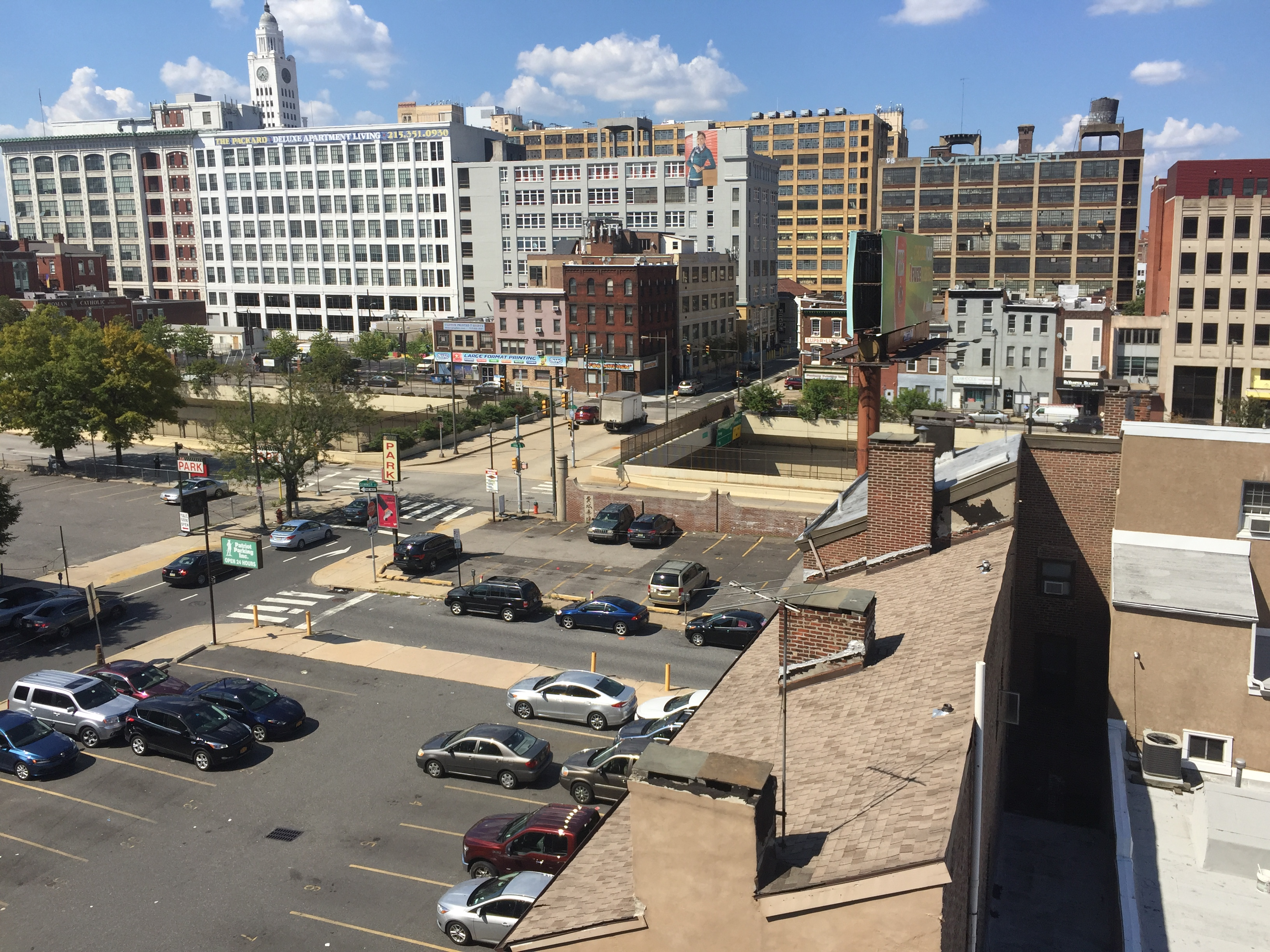
Vine Street at 12th Street
