= Wells Fargo Building (Philadelphia) =

- Fidelity-Philadelphia Trust Company Building (Wells Fargo Building)
- U.S. National Register of Historic Places
- U.S. Historic district – Contributing property
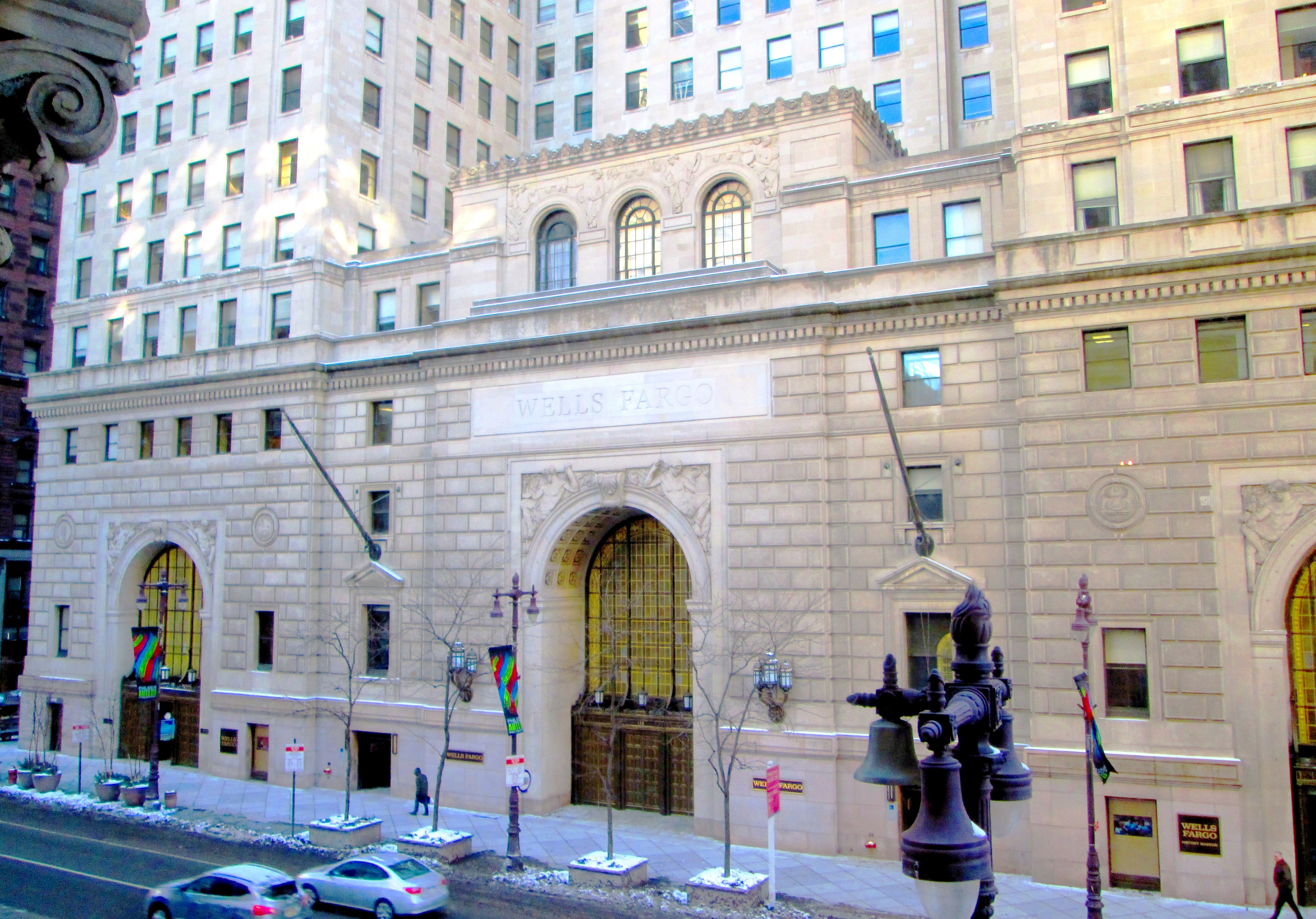
- (2014)

- Location within Philadelphia Location within Pennsylvania Location within the United States
- Location: 137 S. Broad St. Philadelphia, Pennsylvania
- Coordinates: 39°56′58″N 75°9′52″W
- Built: 1927–28
- Architect: Simon & Simon
- Architectural style: Beaux-Arts
- Part of: Broad Street Historic District (ID84003529)
- NRHP reference No.: 78002447
- Added to NRHP: November 27, 1978

The Wells Fargo Building, originally the Fidelity-Philadelphia Trust Company Building, is a skyscraper in Center City, Philadelphia, Pennsylvania, United States. Designed in the Beaux-Arts style by the architectural firm Simon & Simon, the building was erected for the Fidelity-Philadelphia Trust Co. in 1928. The 30-story high-rise is listed on the National Register of Historic Places.

The building was long regarded as premier office space, but by the 1980s, tenants were leaving for newer buildings in the West Market Street neighborhood. Extensive rehab work has since drawn new tenants. Its largest tenant has always been the Fidelity-Philadelphia Trust Company or its successor companies — today, Wells Fargo.

The 405-foot (123 m) limestone and granite skyscraper features recesses that give the building an H-shape above the fifth floor. Decorations include sculpture by Piccirilli Brothers and 150,000 square feet (14,000 m^{2}) of marble. Seven medallions, mainly depicting early American coins, decorate the street-level facade. Bas-relief figures decorate the spandrels above the building's bronze doors, which are themselves decorated by high-relief panels depicting the history of commerce and civilization.

== History ==
In the late 1920s, numerous high-rises were constructed in Center City Philadelphia. Among the businesses commissioning new high-rises was the Fidelity-Philadelphia Trust Company, the result of the 1926 merger between Fidelity Trust Company and the Philadelphia Trust Company. Before the merger, in 1925, architects Edward P. Simon and Grant M. Simon of the firm Simon and Simon were approached to design a new building. The designs were complete by the end of 1926 and in January 1927 general contractor Irwin & Leighton was engaged to build the Fidelity-Philadelphia Trust Company Building. The site of the building along Broad Street was previously the location of the Forrest Theater and the "Yellow Mansion" (also known as the Dundas Lippincott House).

Construction began in 1927 and the building was opened on June 1, 1928. The building became premier office space in the center of the city, serving as the home of major law firms among other tenants. In 1953, steel and concrete penthouses were built at the back of the building to house air conditioning equipment.

In July 1982, the parent company of Fidelity Bank, Fidelcor, put up for sale Fidelity Building Corp., a subsidiary which owns The Fidelity Building and the neighboring Witherspoon Building. In December of that year, Fidelcor announced that the Al-Tajir Foundation, a real estate investment company owned by Mahdi Al Tajir, had agreed to buy Fidelity Building Corp. for US$63.5 million.

During the late-1980s office building boom in the West Market Street area of Center City, businesses left the Fidelity Building for newer office space. As a result, the building's owners filed for Chapter 11 bankruptcy protection in 1992. That same year, the Fidelity Building Corporation was purchased by First Fidelity Bankcorp, a company formed in the 1988 merger of the building's original owners and First Fidelity Corporation of Newark, New Jersey.

First Union Corporation took control of the building in 1995 when it bought Fidelity Bankcorp. Shortly after taking over, First Union spent millions of dollars renovating the facade and interiors and modernizing the mechanical systems. In 2000, First Fidelity Building Corporation, a company controlled by First Union, put the Fidelity Building up for sale. Later that year, Nicholas Schorsch, of the American Financial Resource Group, and a group of investors bought the building for about US$110 million. In 2006, a 256,000-square-foot (23,800 m^{2}) portion of the lower floors of the building was sold to Resnick Development Corporation, a subsidiary of Jack Resnick & Sons Incorporated. In April 2008, American Financial Realty Trust sold the remainder of the building to SSH Real Estate and Young Capital for US$57.7 million.

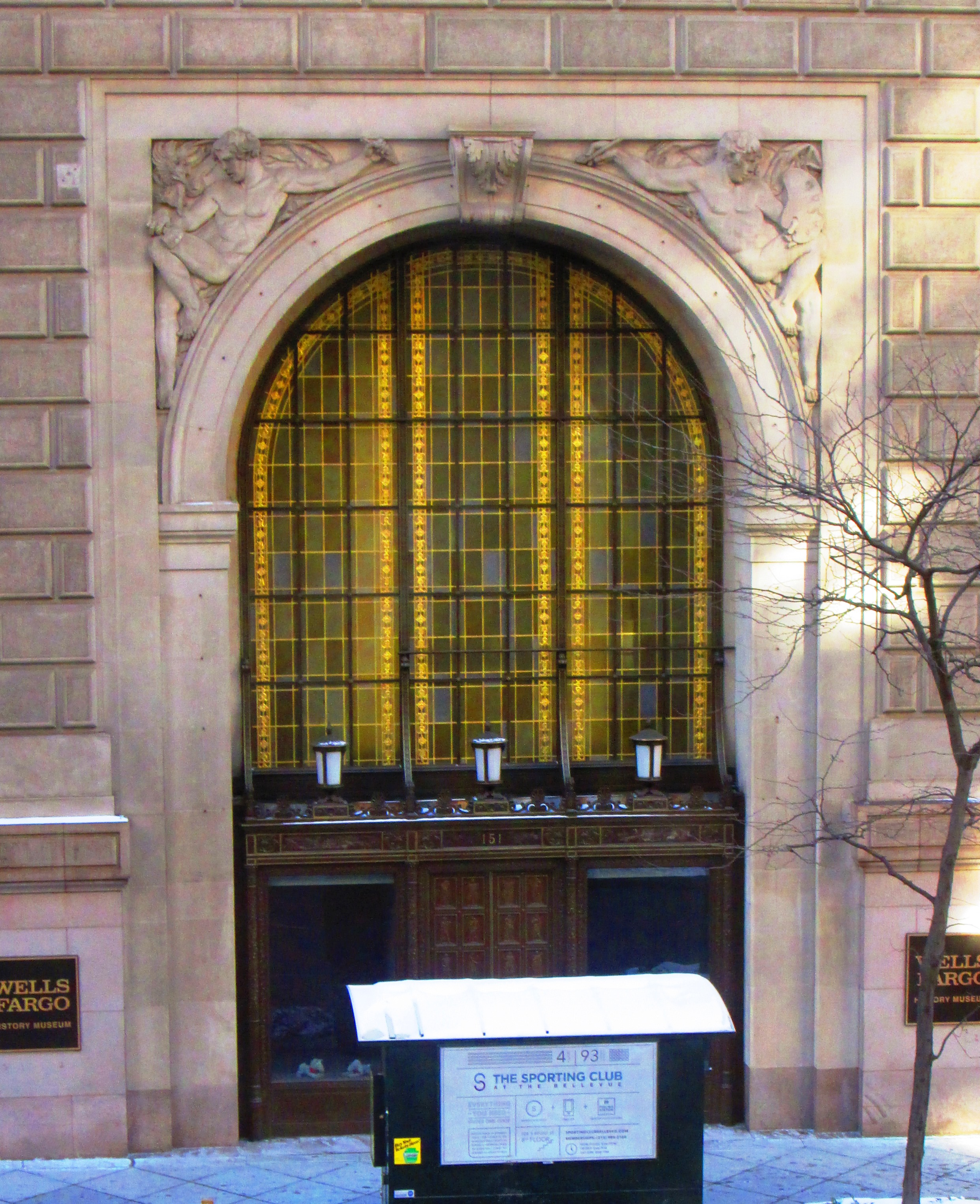
South entrance to the building (2014)

During the early 2000s, the building became known as the Wachovia Building. Wachovia became the building's largest tenant after merging with First Union Corporation early in the decade. In 2006, Wachovia re-negotiated its lease, which was set to expire in 2010. After exploring other potential new office space in Center City, Wachovia made a deal to stay in the Wachovia Building along with the neighboring Witherspoon Building, the nearby One South Broad, and the Widener Building until the 2020s. The building became known as the Wells Fargo Building after Wells Fargo, which bought Wachovia in 2008, re-branded Wachovia area banks in April 2011. Wells Fargo marketed the change by having a stagecoach carrying Philadelphia mayor Michael Nutter and others ride from Philadelphia City Hall to the Wells Fargo Building.

== Architecture ==
The 30-story, 405-foot-tall (123 m) Wells Fargo Building is located on the Avenue of the Arts in Center City, Philadelphia. The building faces Broad Street on the west, Walnut Street on the south, and Sansom Street on the north. To the east of the building is the 11-story Witherspoon Building, built in 1896. Owned by the same owners, the two buildings are linked together. Containing 892,000 square feet (83,000 m^{2}), the Wells Fargo Building's footprint measures 220 feet 6.5 inches (67.22 m) by 175 feet 5.5 inches (53.48 m). Built in the Beaux-Arts style the building's brick curtain wall is made of limestone ashlar on the upper and lower floors and rusticated granite on the 2nd and 3rd floors.

Horizontally the building is divided into three parts. The first two stories and a mezzanine level make up the building's base. The next eighteen floors make up the building's shaft and center. The distinctive features of the center are two 55 feet (17 m) recesses on the east and west sides of the building. Starting above the fourth floor, the recesses give the building an H-shape. The skyscraper's top section is distinguished from the lower floors by three small setbacks.

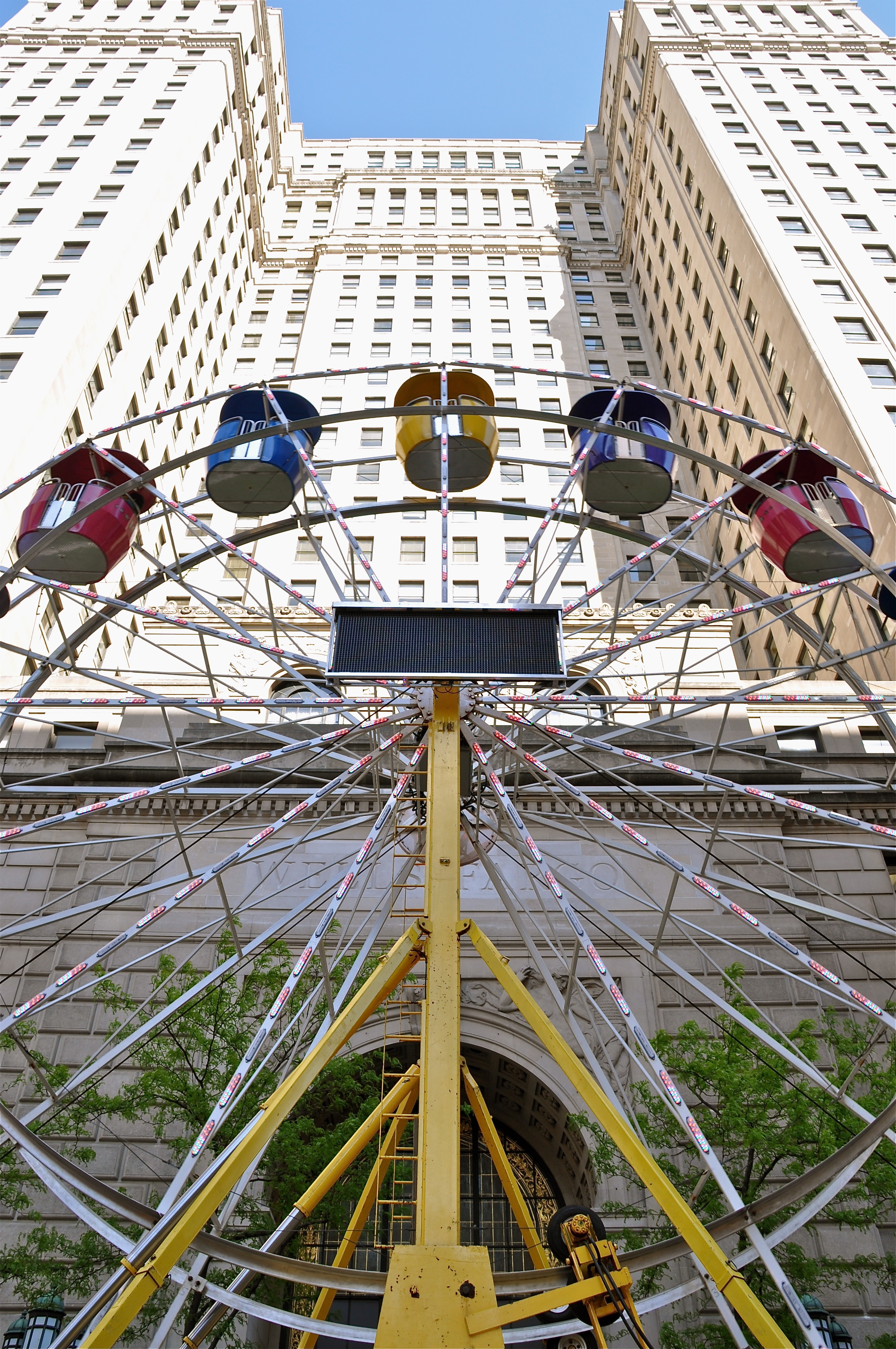
The building during the 2011 Philadelphia International Festival of the Arts

At street level, three arched entranceways line Broad Street. The central arch is slightly larger than the others to indicate the entrance to the main banking hall. Carved into the facade above the center arch is the building's name. Inside the arches and above the doorways are windows designed by d'Ascenzo Studios. Leaded panes of glass of various shades of amber are surrounded by a Renaissance-style border. Below the windows are bronze doors, each with 24 high-relief panels depicting the history of commerce and civilization. Bas-relief figures decorate each of the arches' spandrels. A male figure with a hammer representing industry and a female figure with a beehive representing thrift decorate the center arch. The arch closest to Sansom Street is decorated by two figures with cornucopias to represent abundance. The arch nearer to Walnut Street is decorated by a painter and a sculptor to represent art.

Next to the two smaller archways are carved medallions, one flanking each spandrel. The medallions closest to Sansom Street represent early American coins, a Pine Tree coin from Massachusetts and Grandi Copper coin from Connecticut. The medallions closest to the Walnut Street side represent the first American coin issued by Congress and the Eye Coin from Vermont. Two medallions on the Walnut Street side depict both sides of the Lafayette Medal. Only one medallion decorates the Samson Street side, depicting another early coin from Vermont.

The Wells Fargo Building's interiors include a 2½-story banking hall featuring six 58-ton steel girders that support the skyscraper's structure. The girders were the largest in the Eastern United States at the time of construction. Among the 150,000 square feet (14,000 m^{2}) of marble inside the Wells Fargo Building is the cream-colored terrazzo marble used throughout the banking hall. At the rear of the hall is a marble sculpture by the Piccirilli Brothers. The statue depicts semi-nude male and female representations of day and night clasping hands under a clock to symbolize eternity.

Above the statue and framed by marble pilasters is a window that depicts scenes from Philadelphia history. In the window's tympanum is a depiction of Independence Hall. Below that are pictures showing William Penn's treaty with the Indians, George Washington's Farewell Address to Congress, the proclamation of the Declaration of Independence, the Philadelphia Convention, the drafting of the Declaration of Independence, Benjamin Franklin's printing office, Betsy Ross exhibiting the United States flag, and Caesar Rodney's ride from Delaware. The border of the window contains portrait busts of notable American Revolution-era Philadelphians: John Bartram, George Clymer, Robert Morris, David Rittenhouse, Benjamin Rush, and James Wilson.

The Wells Fargo Building was added to the National Register of Historic Places on November 27, 1978. The skyscraper was listed because it was an excellent example of commercial Beaux-Arts architecture and because it stands "as a glossary of modern skyscraper design, synthesizing the primary features of three phases of skyscraper development reaching back to the 1880s". The building's characteristics are its tripartite system of a base, shaft, and capital, the treatment of the skyscraper as a tower, and the use of setbacks.

== Tenants ==
Leasing 30 percent of the building, Wells Fargo is the skyscraper's largest tenant. The second largest tenant was law firm Montgomery, McCracken, Walker & Rhoads, which occupies about 108,000 square feet (10,000 m^{2}) on the top five and a half floors; the firm signed a 15-year lease in 1995. Other tenants include Domus Inc., which occupies 12,000 square feet (1,100 m^{2}). Domus Inc. moved into the Wells Fargo Building in 2000 after outgrowing its space in the Bellevue-Stratford Hotel.

Past tenants include the law firms Morgan Lewis & Bockius and Pepper Hamilton & Sheetz and offices for the Westmoreland Coal Company. A private eating club used to operate at the top of the building. Called the Midday Club, it was intended "to provide in the heart of the financial district, removed from the noise and activity of the street, a place where businessmen can dine in a restful atmosphere with their business associates". The Midday Club opened in 1929 and closed in 1978.

== Museum ==
The lobby held a branch of the Wells Fargo History Museum; its exhibits include a stagecoach, telegraph equipment, historic clothing and currency. Wells Fargo shuttered all of their museums in 2020 except one in San Francisco.

== In popular culture ==
- In 1983, the Wells Fargo Building was featured in the film Trading Places, which starred Dan Aykroyd and Eddie Murphy.

== See also ==
- List of tallest buildings in Philadelphia
