= Parkway Central Library =

Historic building in Philadelphia

Coordinates: 39.9595°N 75.1710°W

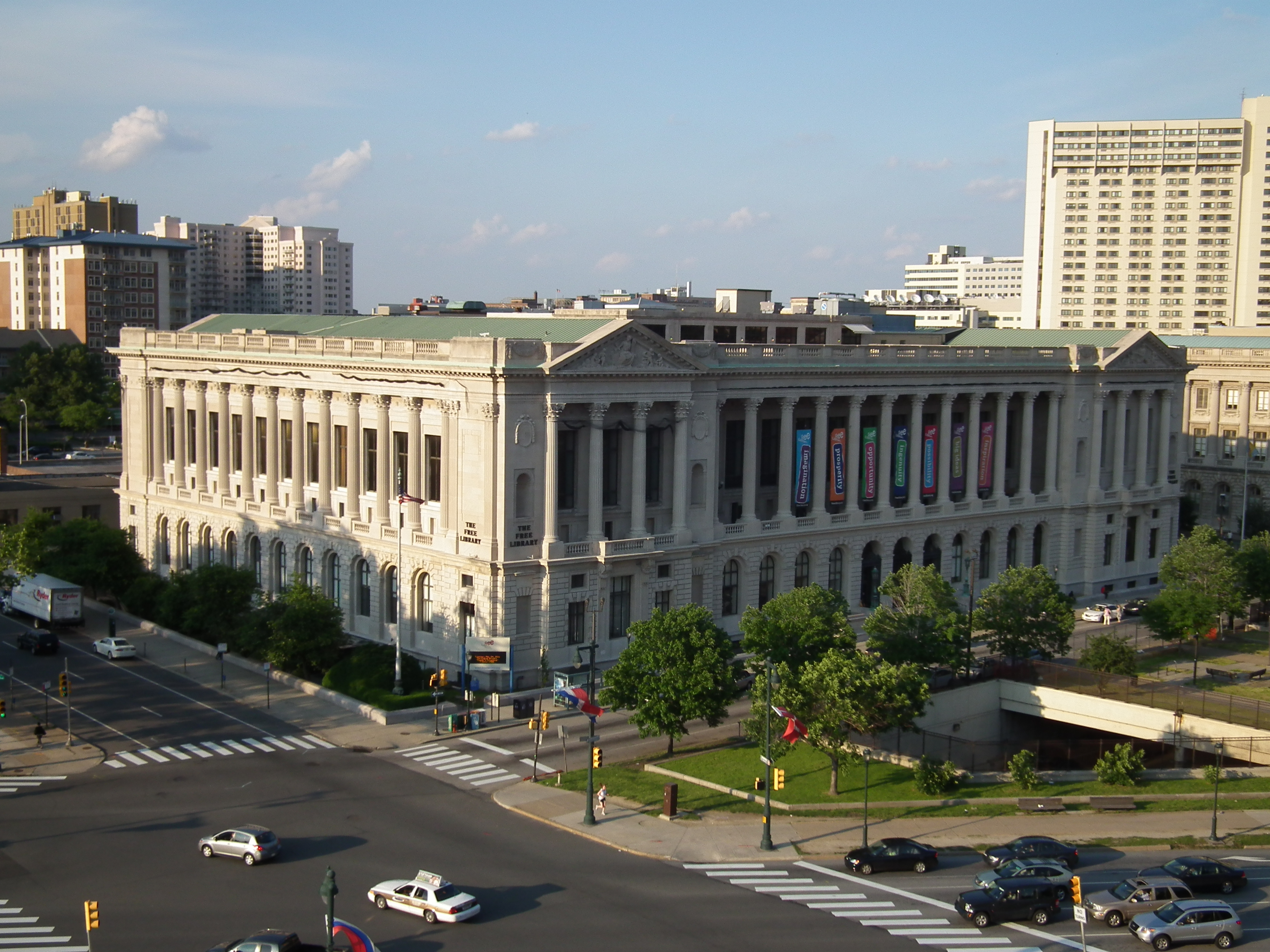
- Parkway Central Library on Vine Street in Philadelphia
- Location: 1901 Vine Street, Philadelphia, Pennsylvania, 19103
- Established: June 2, 1927; 99 years ago
- Branches: 54

Collection
- Items collected: Automobile Reference Collection; Chamber Music Collection; Children's Literature Research Collection; Drinker Choral Music Library; Early American Children's Books; Edwin A. Fleisher Collection of Orchestral Music; Map Collection; Print and Picture Collection; Rare Book Collections; Sheet Music Collection; Theatre Collection

Access and use
- Population served: 1,560,297

Other information
- Director: Kelly Richards
- Website: https://libwww.freelibrary.org/locations/parkway-central-library

Parkway Central Library also known as Free Library or Central Library is the main public library building and administrative headquarters of the Free Library of Philadelphia system. It is the largest library, and only research library, of 54 library branches in the Free Library system.

The library opened on Vine Street in Philadelphia in 1927. Four stories and the ground floor are open to the public. The main entrance steps are on Vine Street, between 19th and 20th Street.

== History ==
=== 19th century ===
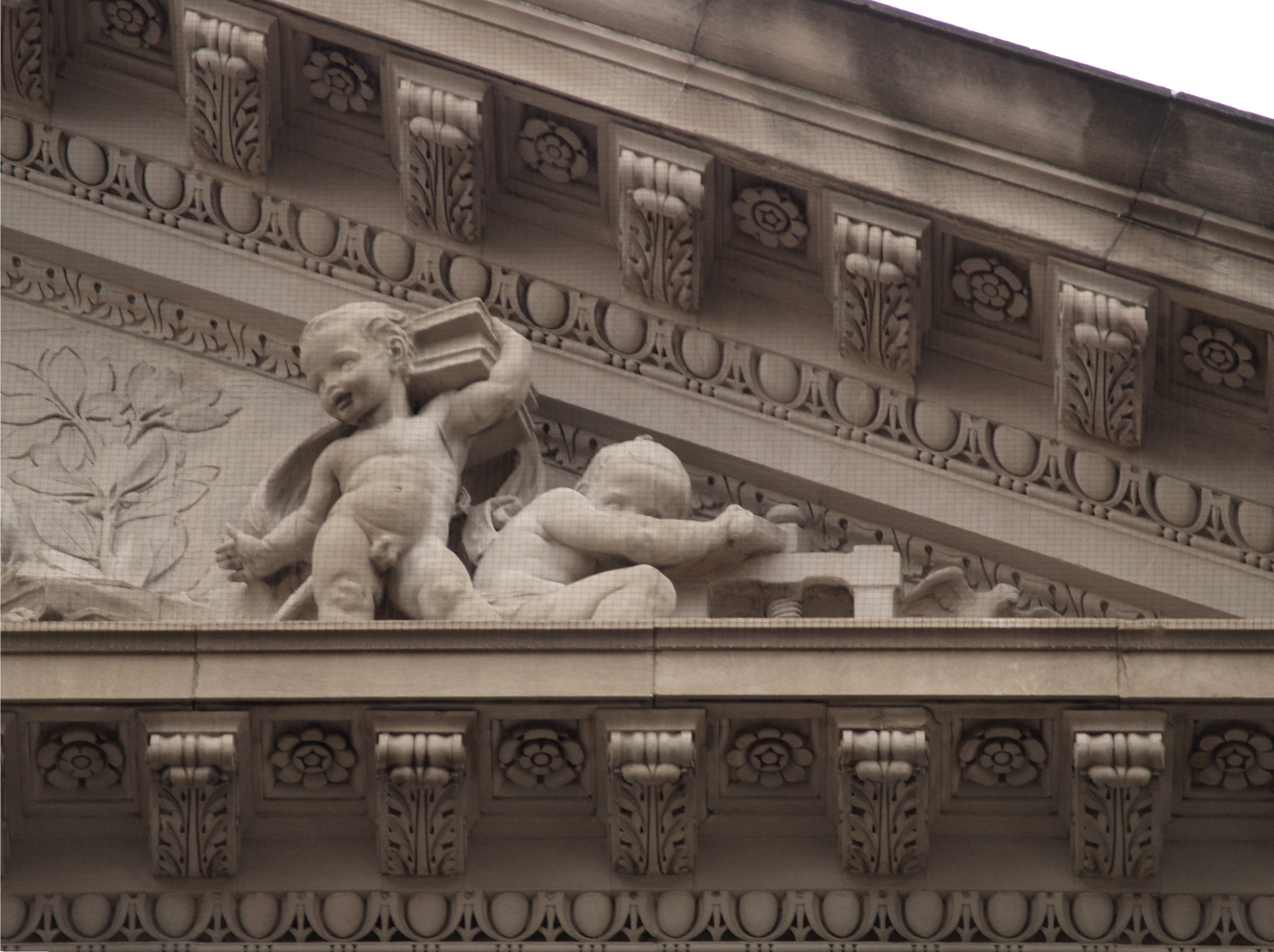
Pediment Of The Central Library

William Pepper secured initial funding through a $225,000 bequest from his wealthy uncle, George S. Pepper, and chartered the Free Library of Philadelphia in 1891 as "a general library which shall be free to all". The first public library in Philadelphia was opened in March 1894.

The initial library was located in three cramped rooms at City Hall, but moved on February 11 of the following year to the old Concert Hall at 1217-1221 Chestnut Street. Library officials criticized this second facility as "an entirely unsuitable building, where its work is done in unsafe, unsanitary and overcrowded quarters, temporary make-shifts". Fifteen years later the library was moved again, on December 1, 1910, to the northeast corner of 13th and Locust streets.

=== 20th century ===
Parkway Central Library had been planned for its current location since 1911; various obstacles, including World War I, held up progress. Construction started in 1917 and was completed in 1927. The grand Beaux-Arts building was designed by Julian Abele, chief designer in the office of prominent Philadelphia architect Horace Trumbauer.

Its design is similar to that of the adjacent Philadelphia Family Court building, and their placement on Logan Circle closely follows that of the Hôtel de Crillon and the Hôtel de la Marine on Place de la Concorde in Paris.

In addition to being the main library, the building serves as the system's administrative building. The library opened on June 2, 1927, at its present location on 1901 Vine Street in Philadelphia.

== Library ==
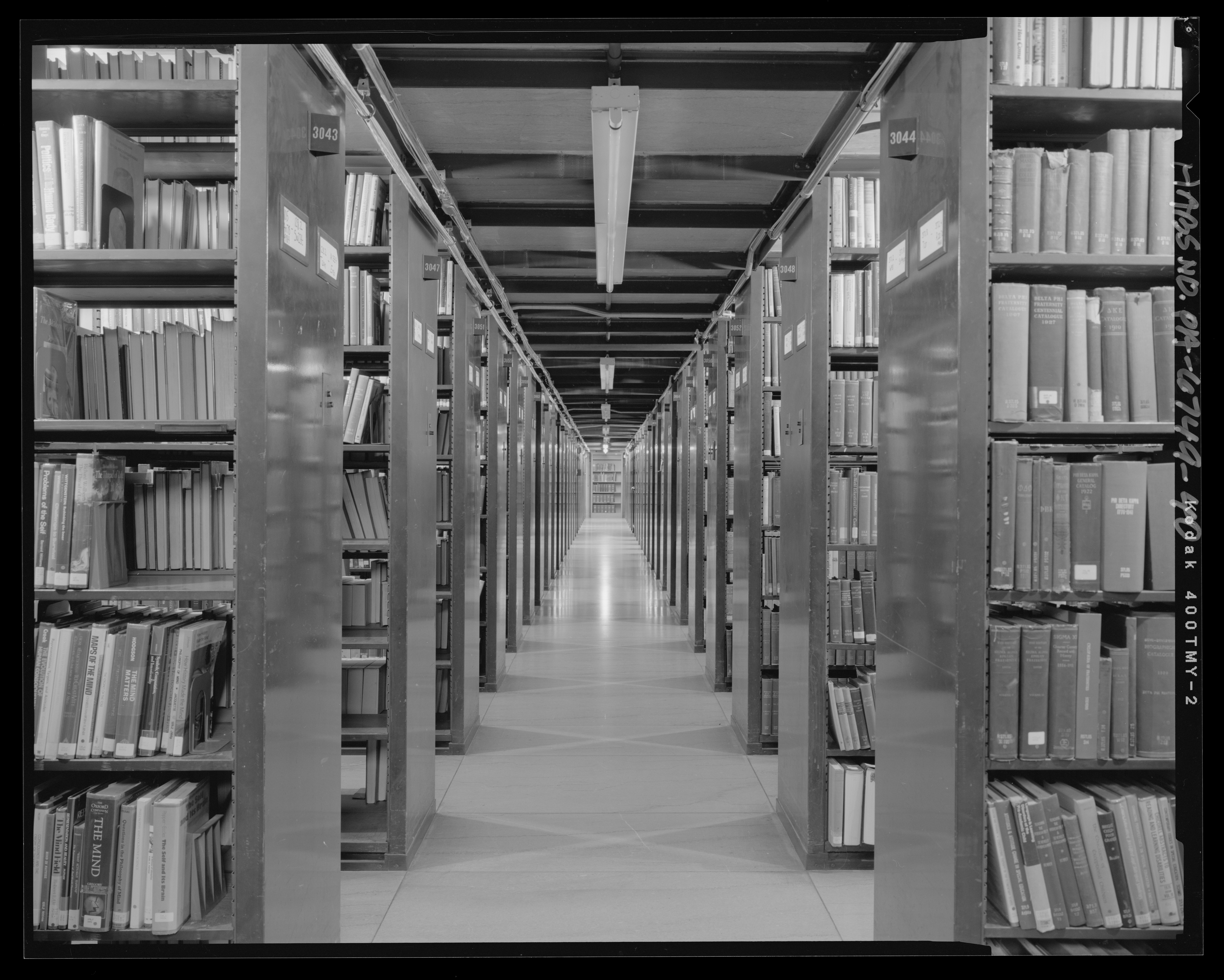
The 4th level books stacks prior to its relocation to the Regional Operations Center

Four stories and the ground floor are currently open to the public.

Until 2016, the library used an elevator system, similar to one used by the New York Public Library system, to retrieve books from large collections housed in the storage stacks. In 2014, books located in storage were transferred to the Regional Operations Center (ROC) which is open only to staff.

=== Philbrick Hall ===
Philbrick Hall, located on the first floor, is the fiction, popular culture and central circulation department of the library.

=== Pepper Hall ===
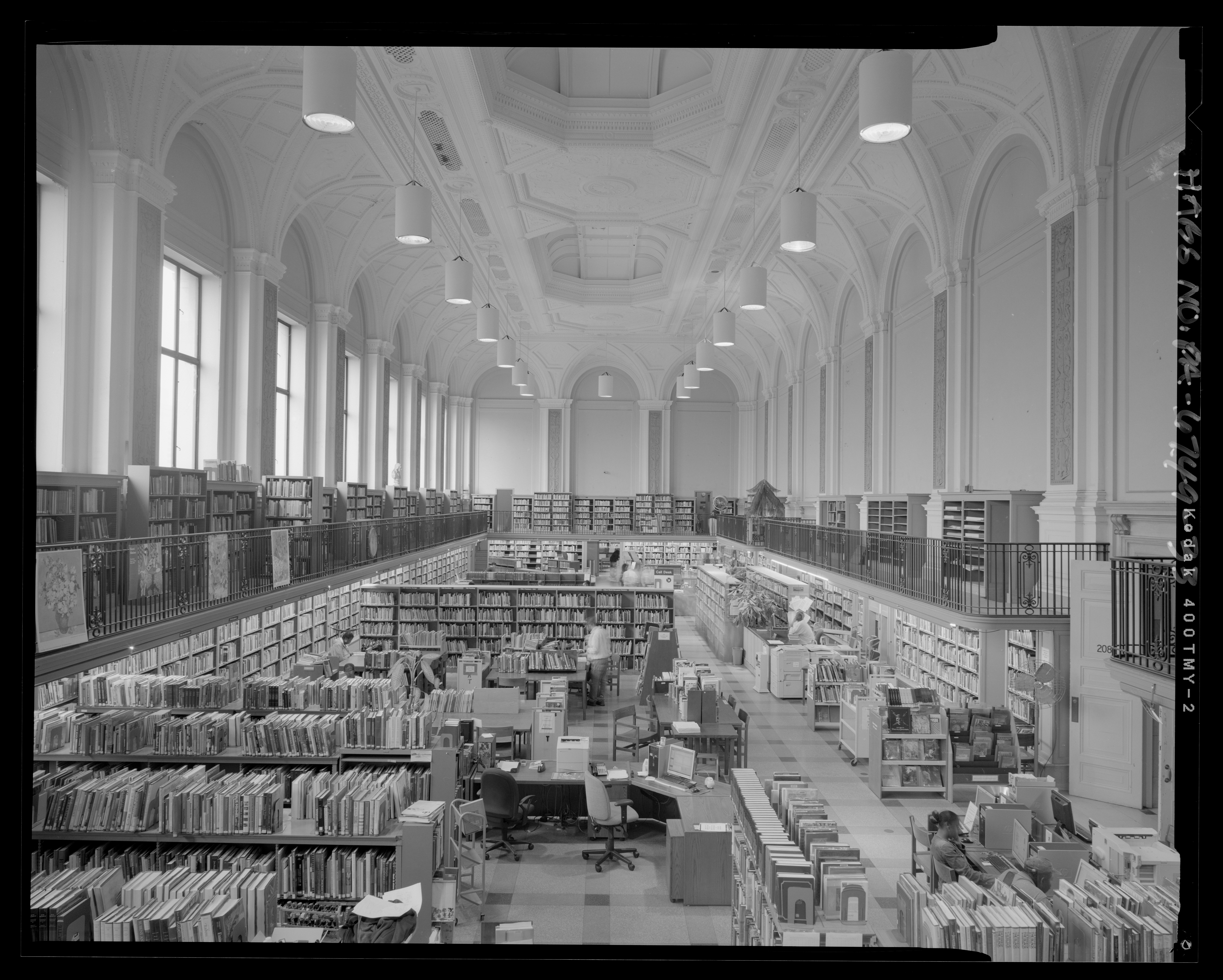
Pepper Hall in 2008

Pepper Hall houses both the literature department which contains over 100,000 volumes and the art department which maintains a collection of over 60,000 books on fine arts, crafts, collectibles and photography.

=== Culinary Literacy Center ===
After renovations, the 4th floor currently contains the Culinary Literacy Center, a commercial-grade kitchen used as a classroom and public education dining space which opened in June 2014. The concept came from Free Library of Philadelphia's president and Director, Siobhan Reardon who wanted to "create a space to advance literacy through food and cooking around a communal table". The other section holds the Skyline Terrace which includes a green roof. Another section of the floor is used as event spaces and meeting rooms.

== Special collections ==
=== Children's Literature Research Collection ===
The library's Children's Literature Research Collection maintains a research collection of children's literature published after 1836. The CLRC archive holds of the one the largest collections of primary source material for children's literature in the country. The collection includes a range of original artwork, manuscripts, and ephemera from children's literature.

=== Rare Book Department ===
The Rare Book Department features the Charles Dickens’ collection, with first editions, personal letters, and Dickens’ stuffed raven, Grip, among illuminated manuscripts, Americana, Beatrix Potter, early children's books, Edgar Allan Poe, and Pennsylvania German folk art. The John Frederick Lewis Collection of European Manuscripts contains over 200 illuminated manuscripts from the 11th to the 16th centuries, and approximately 2,300 cuttings and manuscripts leaves.

There are over 50 Books of Hours, numerous bibles, liturgical texts, and psalters, including the Lewis Psalter from the reign of Saint Louis. Works of secular literature are represented including Lewis' illuminated manuscripts from the Widener Collection. There is collection of approximately 800 incunabula, of which 500 come from the P.A.B. Widerner bequest of 1899. The collection of eastern Asian manuscripts, from John Frederick Lewis are in the library. The 153 East Asian manuscripts provide physical formats, including books, scrolls, accordion books, and palm-leaf books.

=== Music ===
The library music department contains the Edwin A. Fleisher Collection of Orchestral Music, the world's largest lending library of orchestral music consisting of over 21,000 titles and offers a research center into the lives of composers and conductors in the 19th and 20th century. The department holds the Drinker Collection which contains over 900 works of sacred and secular music for choral performances.

=== Others ===
Parkway Central Library's Automobile Reference Collection maintains an extensive automobile catalog.

The library holds over 130,000 maps from around the world, both historic and current as a part of their Map Collection. Items in the special collections have been digitized and can be viewed online.

== 2019 renovations ==
In April 2019, three new sections opened in the library after over a decade of renovations.

=== Business Resource and Innovation Center ===
On April 12, 2019, the Business Resource and Innovation Center which opened in 2016 was moved to the newly renovated space on the ground floor of Parkway Central Library. The Business Resource and Innovation Center focuses on helping people find new employment opportunities, helping small business growth and assistance in grant finding for non-profit organizations including prospect research.

The center also offers assistance in intellectual property protection and is one of three locations in Pennsylvania to be designated by the United States Patent and Trademark Office as a Patent & Trademark Resource Center.

=== Marie and Joseph Field Teen Center ===
Also located on the ground floor is the 4000-square-foot Marie and Joseph Field Teen Center which is designed as a teen oriented activity center where young adults can form study groups and have access to young adult non-fiction and fiction.

=== Robert and Eileen Kennedy Heim Center for Cultural and Civic Engagement ===
The Robert and Eileen Kennedy Heim Center for Cultural and Civic Engagement, located on the first floor directly above Business Resource and Innovation Center, is designed as a center for "engagement and interaction, intellectual discourse, and grassroots problem solving".

== See also ==
- List of libraries in 19th-century Philadelphia
- List of Carnegie libraries in Philadelphia
- Benjamin Franklin Parkway
