= Bergdoll =

Bergdoll is a surname. Notable people with the surname include:

- Barry Bergdoll (born 1955), American art historian
- Grover Cleveland Bergdoll (1893–1966), American aviator, racing driver, and World War I draft dodger

== See also ==
- Bergdoll Mansion
- Louis Bergdoll House
