= Windrim =

Windrim is a surname. Notable people with the surname include:

- James H. Windrim (1840–1919), American architect
- John T. Windrim (1866–1934), American architect, father of John
