= 26th District Police and Patrol Station =

- U.S. National Register of Historic Places
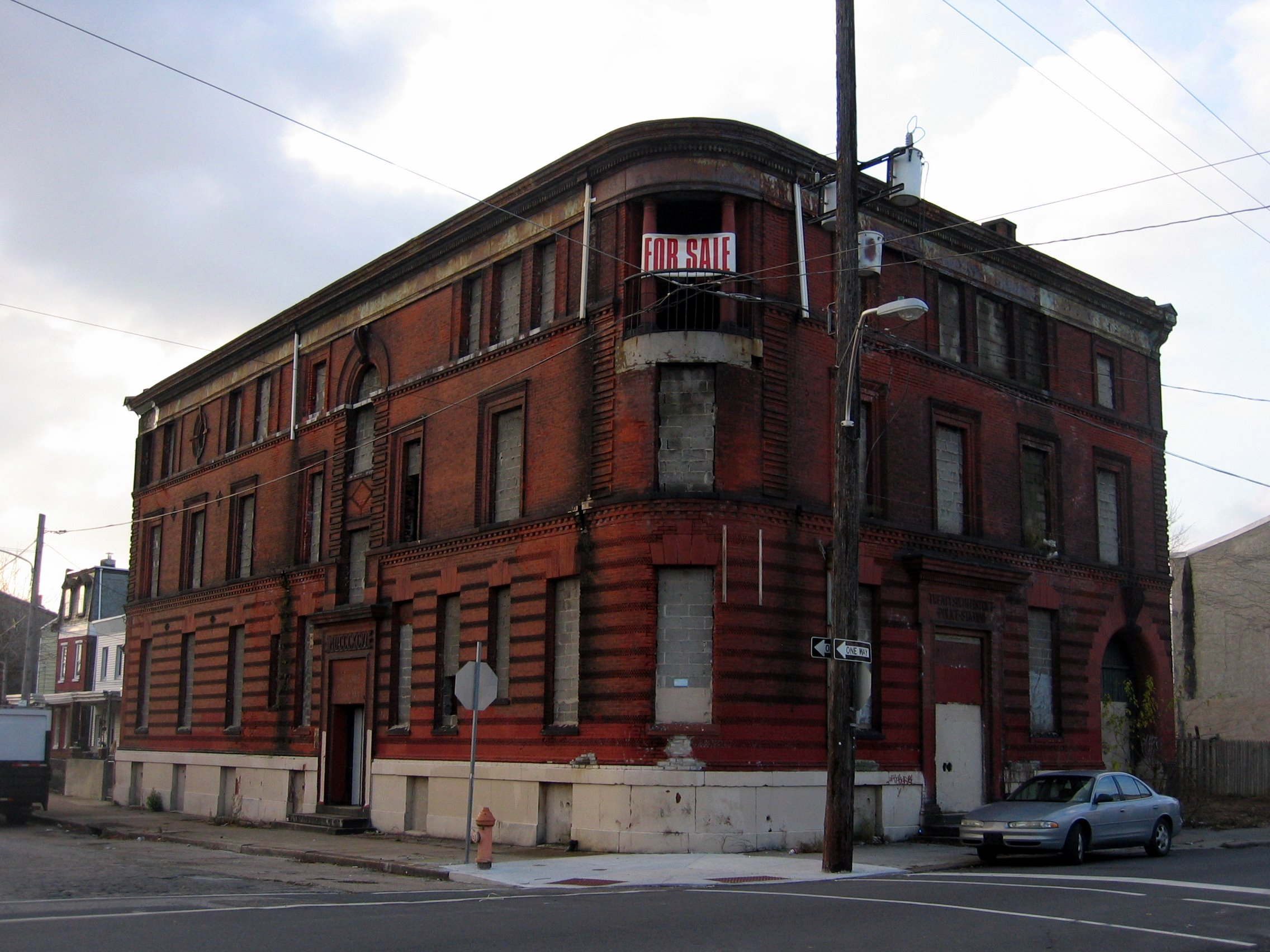
- (2009 photograph)

- Location within Philadelphia Location within Pennsylvania Location within the United States
- Location: 2136–2142 E. Dauphin St., Philadelphia, Pennsylvania
- Coordinates: 39°58′51″N 75°7′47″W
- Area: <1 acre
- Built: 1896
- Architect: John T. Windrim; Doyle and Doak
- Architectural style: Renaissance
- NRHP reference No.: 84003550
- Added to NRHP: July 12, 1984

The 26th District Police and Patrol Station is a historic police station in the Kensington neighborhood of Philadelphia, Pennsylvania. It was designed by architect John T. Windrim (1866-1934) and built in 1896. It and is a three-story, "L"-plan, brownstone and brick building in the Renaissance style. It features a monumental arched entrance with terra cotta decorative elements, curved corner, copper entablature, wide frieze, and pitched roof. It housed a police station until 1969.

It was added to the National Register of Historic Places in 1984.

It currently (Sep 2017) houses a branch of The Philadelphia Federal Credit Union.
