= One South Broad =

Office tower in Philadelphia, Pennsylvania, US

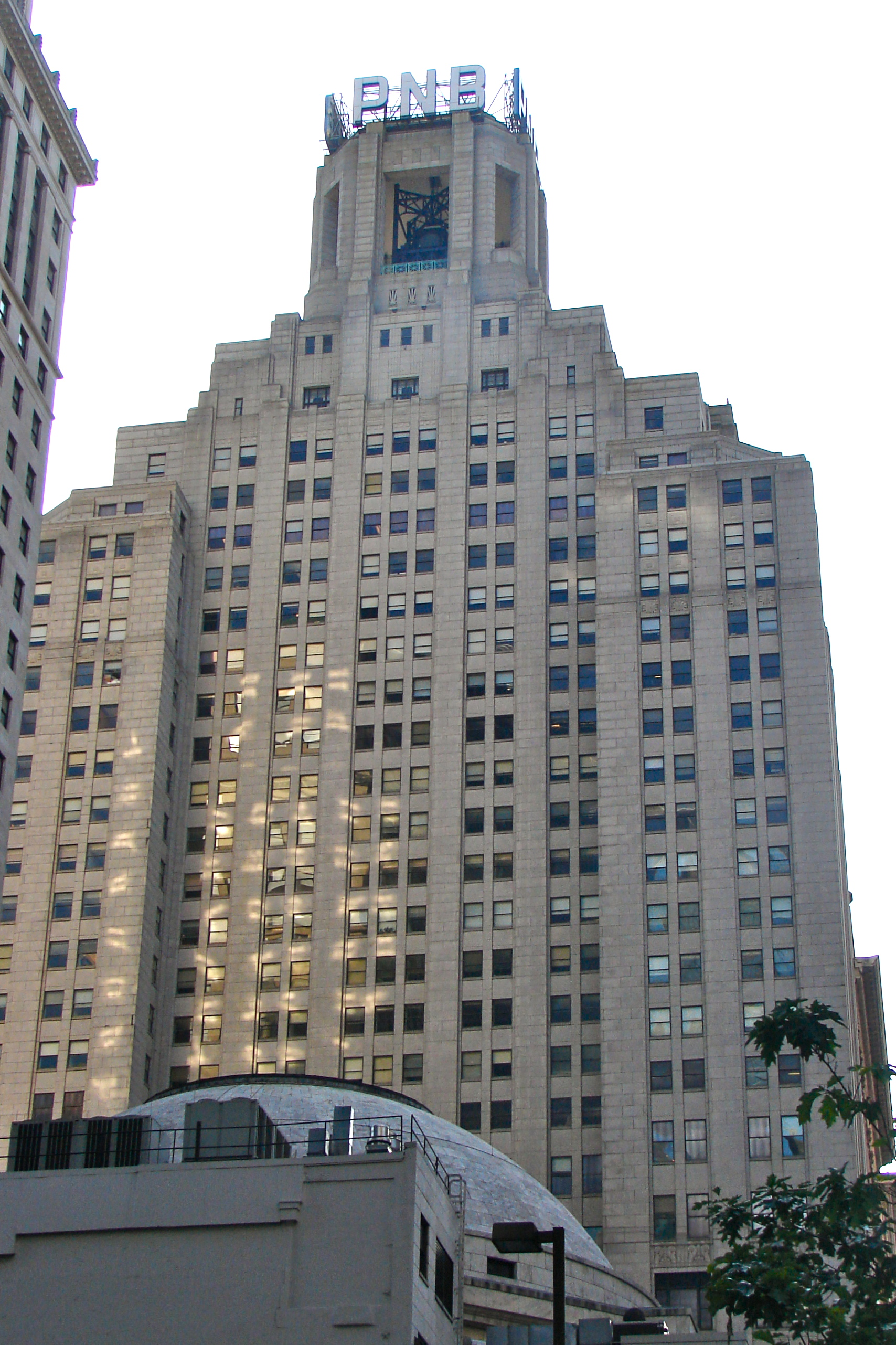

- Location within Pennsylvania

General information
- Status: Completed
- Type: Office
- Architectural style: Art deco
- Location: 1 South Broad Street; Philadelphia, PA 19107; United States
- Coordinates: 39°57′5″N 75°9′49″W
- Completed: 1932
- Owner: One South Broad, LLP

Height
- Roof: 472 feet (144 m)

Technical details
- Floor count: 28
- Floor area: 465,000 square feet (43,000 m^{2})

Design and construction
- Architect: John Torrey Windrim
- Developer: Wanamaker's
- 1 S. Broad Street
- U.S. Historic district – Contributing property
- Part of: Broad Street Historic District (ID84003529)
- Designated CP: April 6, 1984

One South Broad, also known as the Lincoln-Liberty Building or PNB Building, is a 28-story 472-foot (144 m) office tower in Center City, Philadelphia, Pennsylvania, United States. The art deco tower, designed by architect John Torrey Windrim as an annex for Wanamaker's department store, was completed in 1932. Wanamaker's Men's Store opened in the first seven floors of the building, which is located a block from Wanamaker's main store, and was intended to rival European department stores with its size and selection. In 1952, the Philadelphia National Bank (PNB) bought the building and converted it into offices and banking space. Until 2014, the building's bell tower was decorated on all four sides with PNB's initials in stainless steel 16 feet (4.9 m) tall. Wells Fargo is the main tenant, occupying almost half the building. The former banking space at street level was converted to retail and restaurant space in 2000.

Containing 465,000 square feet (43,000 m^{2}) of space, One South Broad features a three-story gallery lobby that connects to the Widener Building, adjacent to the south. The 24th and 25th floors originally featured a luxurious penthouse designed for Rodman Wanamaker and his wife; it was converted to office use in 2000 by independent advertising agency Red Tettemer O'Connell + Partners. The tower houses the 17-ton Founder's Bell, one of the largest in the world, a memorial to John Wanamaker by his son Rodman; listed on the Philadelphia Register of Historic Places by the Philadelphia Historical Commission, the bell is rung hourly, except for Sundays.

== History ==
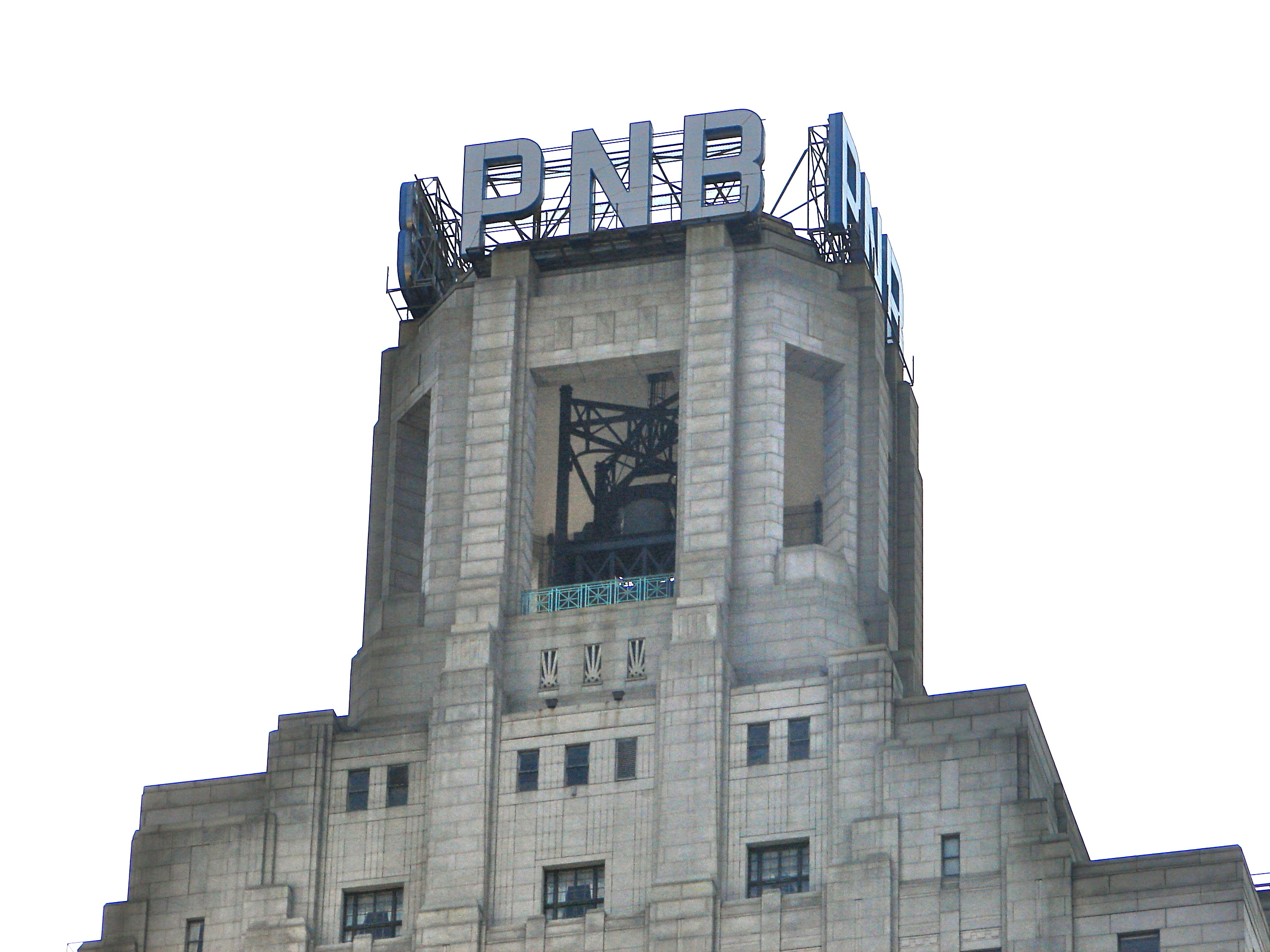
Philadelphia National Bank placed its initials on the bell tower in the 1950s.

In the late 1920s, numerous high-rises were being built in Center City Philadelphia. Among the businesses constructing their own skyscrapers was Wanamaker's department store. Under direction of Wanamaker President William L. Nevin, Wanamaker's decided to expand its Philadelphia store by constructing a new building that would contain a store catering to the "Philadelphia gentleman". Nevin directed Wanamaker's to buy property on South Broad Street across the street from Philadelphia City Hall. The land was the site of two late-19th-century 13-story high-rises. On the corner of Broad and Penn Square stood the Lincoln Building, originally called the Betz Building. South of that stood the Liberty Building on the corner of Broad and Chestnut Streets. Both buildings were demolished in 1926 to make way for the Lincoln-Liberty Building.

The Lincoln-Liberty Building, completed in 1932, was intended to partly house a large men's department store and offices. The building's cornerstone was set on October 1, 1932, with a ceremony attended by William L. Nevin and Wanamaker executives from New York City, Paris and London. The Wanamaker Men's Store opened on October 12, 1932, with four Wanamaker buglers blowing a reveille and the ringing of the building's Founder's Bell. Opening during the Great Depression, Nevin said the new building was a sign of the store's faith that the economy would improve. Intended to rival European department stores in size and selection, the men's store ordered US$2 million worth of merchandise and was the largest store of its kind in the world. As early as 1939 there were rumors the men's store would close, but Wanamaker's would not close the store unless a replacement tenant would agree to rent the space. When a new tenant was ready to take the store's place in the 1950s, the men's store was relocated to the Wanamaker Building down the street.

In the early 1950s, the Philadelphia National Bank (PNB) needed to expand into a larger space than it currently occupied. On November 3, 1952, the bank bought the Lincoln-Liberty Building for US$8.75 million. PNB president Frederic A. Potts said, "The purchase of this building will enable the Philadelphia National Bank more adequately and efficiently to support the large-scale industrial and commercial expansion under way in this city." The bank spent millions of dollars modernizing the building and converting the former department store floors to banking space. Among the changes was the addition of a sign with the bank's initials in 1955. The bank officially opened in what was now called the PNB Building on January 16, 1956. The opening included turning on a rooftop weather indicator and celebration of the 250th anniversary of Benjamin Franklin's birth.

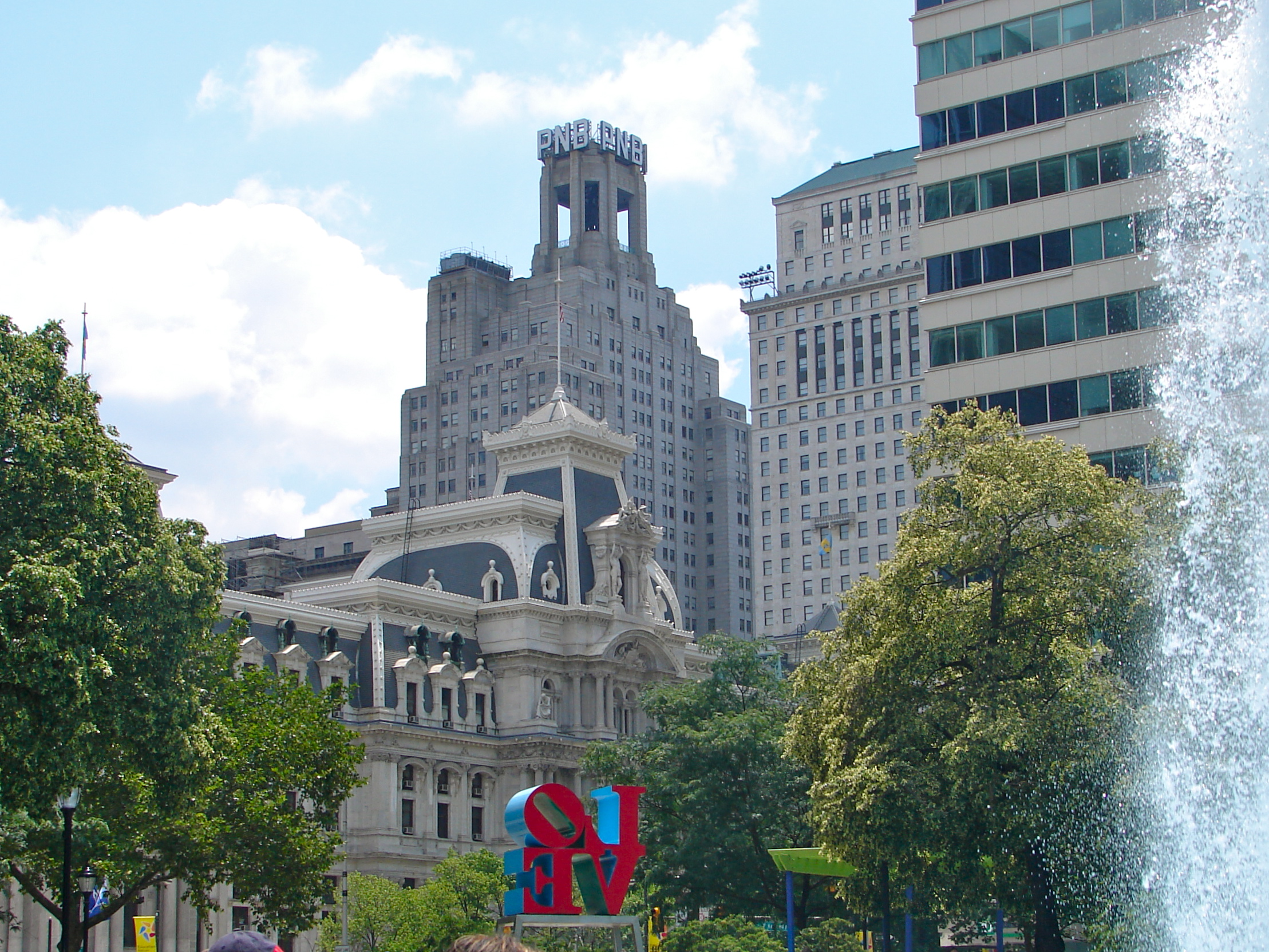
View from LOVE Park with City Hall in front of One South Broad

The building was owned by the PNB, and later its parent company CoreStates, until it was sold to the JPMorgan Strategic Property Fund in 1996 for almost US$28.5 million. In 1998 the building's second-largest tenant, law firm Drinker Biddle & Reath, left for One Logan Square. The resulting vacancy prompted the owners to renovate the building, renamed One South Broad, at a cost of US$10 million. Renovations included modernizing the elevators, security and safety systems and converting the lower floors to retail and restaurant space. The renovations took eighteen months and One South Broad was officially rededicated on May 3, 2000.

In April 2003 JPMorgan sold One South Broad to real-estate investor David Werner for US$48 million. Ninety-percent occupied in 2003, One Broad Street's largest tenant was Wachovia. Wachovia had gained office space in the tower after merging with First Union Corporation, which had merged with CoreStates in 1998. In 2006 Wachovia re-negotiated its lease, which was set to expire in 2010. After looking at other potential space in Center City, Wachovia made a deal to stay in One South Broad and three nearby properties, the Witherspoon Building, Wells Fargo Building, and the neighboring Widener Building, until the 2020s.

== Architecture ==
One South Broad is a 28-story 472 feet (144 m) art deco office tower on south Broad Street in Center City Philadelphia, Pennsylvania. Designed by architect John Torrey Windrim, the skyscraper contains 465,000 square feet (43,000 m^{2}) of space. One South Broad originally had an ornate lower facade with a lot of detail and fluting that was removed in the 1950s renovation. Philadelphia National Bank's renovations included the addition of granite black slabs on the street level facade. These were removed in the 2000 renovation and replaced with imported Italian granite to better match the skyscraper's original architecture. The 2000 renovation also created a new entrance on the building's Broad Street front, which leads to a three-story gallery lobby. The lobby was expanded by demolishing a wall and connecting it to the lobby of the neighboring Widener Building.

Containing 9,000 square feet (840 m^{2}) each, the 24th and 25th floors were used as a penthouse apartment for Rodman Wanamaker, consisting of five bedrooms, six baths, and outdoor terraces. The rooms featured hardwood floors, marble fireplaces, and detailed cast-plaster crown molding. Originally the penthouse apartment was to be for Rodman Wanamaker and his wife but Wanamaker died in 1928 before the building was completed. Rodman Wanamaker's wife lived there only briefly, as she did not like the ringing bell in the tower overhead. The penthouse floors were converted to office use in 2000 by creative agency Red Tettemer + Partners. The firm Agoos/Lovera Architects modernized the basic office space on the 24th floor while preserving the ornate molding and materials that decorate the rest of the former penthouse space.

The Philadelphia National Bank's initials adorned the top of the building, surrounding the top of the structure's bell tower, until 2014. The letters, which were made of 16 feet (4.9 m) stainless steel, each weighed 3,000 pounds (1,400 kg). Until the 1970s, PNB used the sign to forecast weather by lighting the letters in red to indicate a warming trend, or green to predict the opposite. Wachovia considered removing the PNB sign in 2003 to replace it with its own signage, but, in response, some Philadelphians expressed nostalgia for the name of the former Philadelphia institution and hoped the sign would stay. The Philadelphia Historical Commission stated that the sign was not an integral part of the building's design or as significant to the city as the nearby PSFS Building's sign. On August 17, 2014, three of the PNB letters were removed from the building by helicopter, and the remaining nine were removed the following November 16.

=== Founder's Bell ===
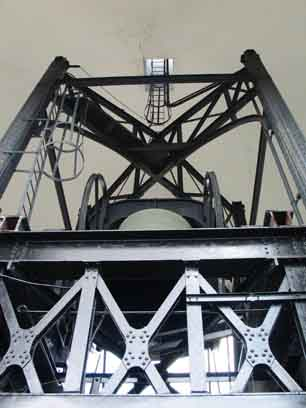
The Founder's Bell

Within the bell tower is the 17-ton (34,776 lbs) Founder's Bell. The bell was cast in 1925 under a commission by Rodman Wanamaker to honor his father John Wanamaker, founder of the department store empire, and the sesquicentennial. Cast by Gillett & Johnston in Croydon, England, the bell is 9 feet 6 inches (2.90 m) at the rim and 7 feet 9 inches (2.36 m) high and is one of the largest bells in the world. The bell was brought in 1926 by the Cunard liner Ascania to New York City, from which it was conveyed to Philadelphia by rail. The bell was carried on a flatcar and had clearance of only 2 inches (5.1 cm) in some of the tunnels the train passed through.

Tuned to a low D bass clef, the bell's original home was the Wanamaker Building, a block from One South Broad. It hung 325 feet (99 m) above the street in a specially built tower on the building's roof. Hung on December 23, 1926, the bell was first rung on New Year's Eve of that year. The bell is rung every hour, except on Sundays. The bell was originally intended to swing in the tower on top of One South Broad, but the swinging of the bell shook the building. A hammer driven by a 230-volt electric motor was later installed and currently rings the bell. The ringing of the bell, which can be heard for 25 miles (40 km), is often mistakenly assumed to come from City Hall's clock tower across the street.

Philadelphia Orchestra conductor Leopold Stokowski wrote in 1962 that the bell had "one of the finest sounds I have heard anywhere in America, Europe or Russia". In June 2000 the Founder's Bell was added to the Philadelphia Register of Historic Places by the Philadelphia Historical Commission.

== Tenants ==
The Wanamaker's Men's Store occupied the first seven floors of the skyscraper until 1952 when the Philadelphia National Bank moved into the building. Over the years PNB became CoreStates, First Union Corp, Wachovia and finally Wells Fargo. Wells Fargo, which bought Wachovia in 2008, is One Broad Street's main tenant, occupying about half the building. Other tenants include various law firms, advertising firm Nitrogen US, public relations firm Tonic Life Communications, consulting company Electronic Ink, and the advertising agency Red Tettemer O'Connell + Partners. Past tenants have included Sylvania Electric Products, law firm Drinker Biddle & Reath, and advertising and public relations firm Earle Palmer Brown.

The street-level space was converted into a bank once PNB bought the building. The bank branch closed in the 1990s and was converted into two roughly 8,000 square feet (740 m^{2}) areas intended for retail or restaurant use. A McCormick & Schmick's restaurant opened in the Broad-Street–Penn-Square corner in 2001. In late 2002, the Broad and Chestnut Streets corner was occupied by a Borders bookstore, which moved into the two-story-plus-mezzanine 27,000 square feet (2,500 m^{2}) space after vacating the 1727 Walnut Street location it had occupied since 1990. Borders closed its store in 2011. A three-story Walgreens presently occupies the site (2014) and areas of the exceptionally beautiful Wanamaker Men's Store plasterwork ceiling are visible at the upper stories.

== See also ==
- List of tallest buildings in Philadelphia
