= Chester Waterside Station of the Philadelphia Electric Company =

- U.S. National Register of Historic Places
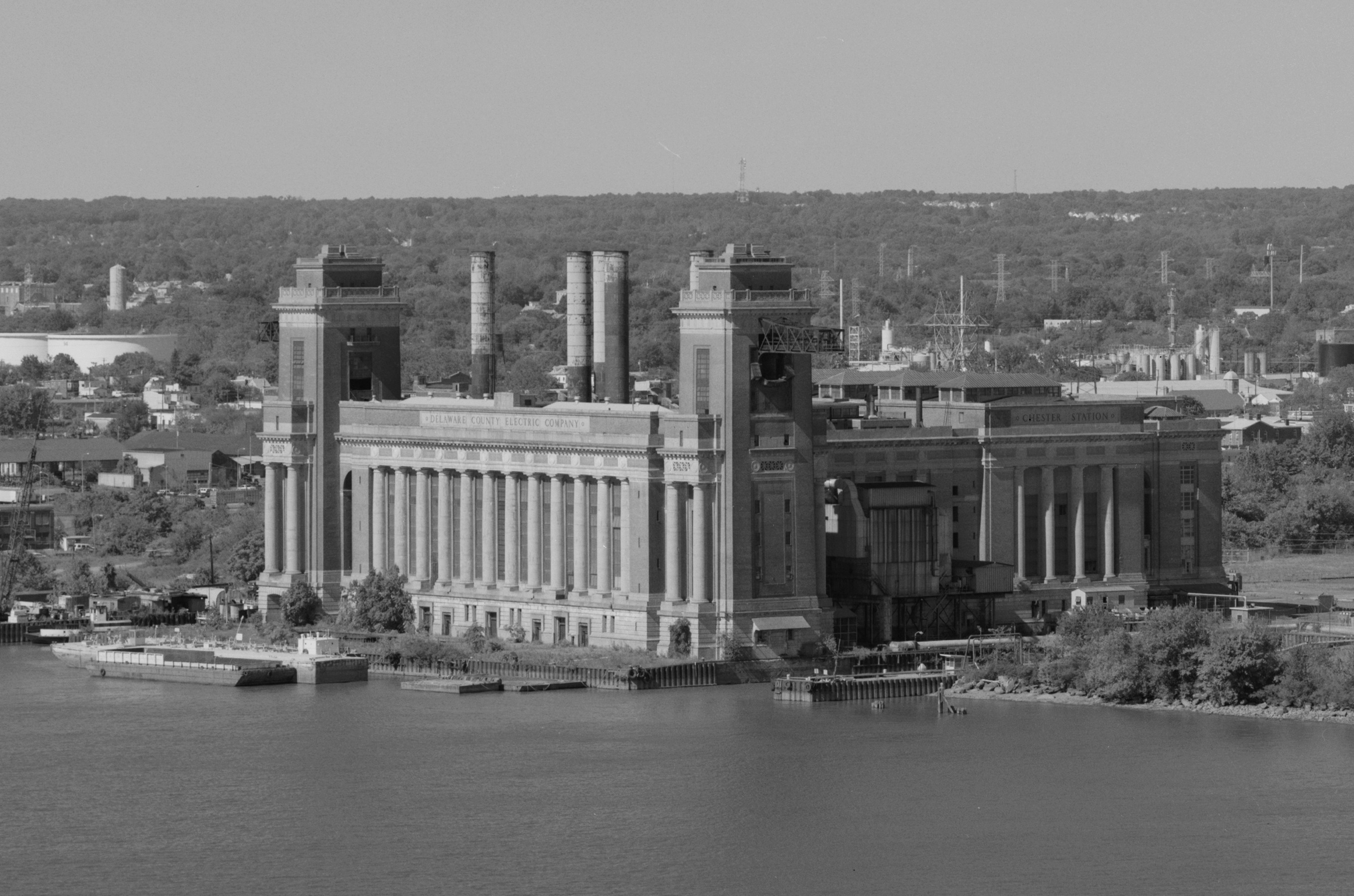
- Chester Waterside Station, 1998

- Location within Pennsylvania Location within the United States
- Location: 2501 Seaport Dr., Chester, Pennsylvania
- Coordinates: 39°49′45″N 75°23′02″W
- Area: 11.9 acres (4.8 ha)
- Built: 1916
- Architect: Windrim, John T.; Eglin, William C.L.
- Architectural style: Beaux-Arts, Neoclassical
- NRHP reference No.: 07000467
- Added to NRHP: May 24, 2007

Chester Waterside Station of the Philadelphia Electric Company is a historic former coal-fired power station, located on the Delaware River in Chester, Delaware County, southeastern Pennsylvania.

Built by the Philadelphia Electric Company, it is currently owned by the PECO Energy Company of the Exelon Corporation. The complex has been converted into an office building.

== Architecture ==
The original section of the Station building was built in 1916, and consists of the Boiler House with attached Coal Towers and Turbine Hall, and the Switch House. The complex was designed by architect John T. Windrim and engineer William C.L. Eglin, and featured then recent advances in generating technology and industrial construction. The principal facades were designed in the Beaux-Arts style.

The Turbine Hall Annex addition was built in 1939-1942.

Also located on the property is the two-story, red brick Machine Shop building, designed in 1925. It was also built by the Philadelphia Electric Company.

== History ==
The complex was listed on the National Register of Historic Places in 2007.

The Chester Waterside Station was documented by the federal HAER−Historic American Engineering Record, with extensive exterior and interior photography by renowned architectural photographer Jack Boucher in 1997 and 1998; architectural drawings; and a detailed descriptive report of the facility design and history, and its contemporary industrial history contexts.

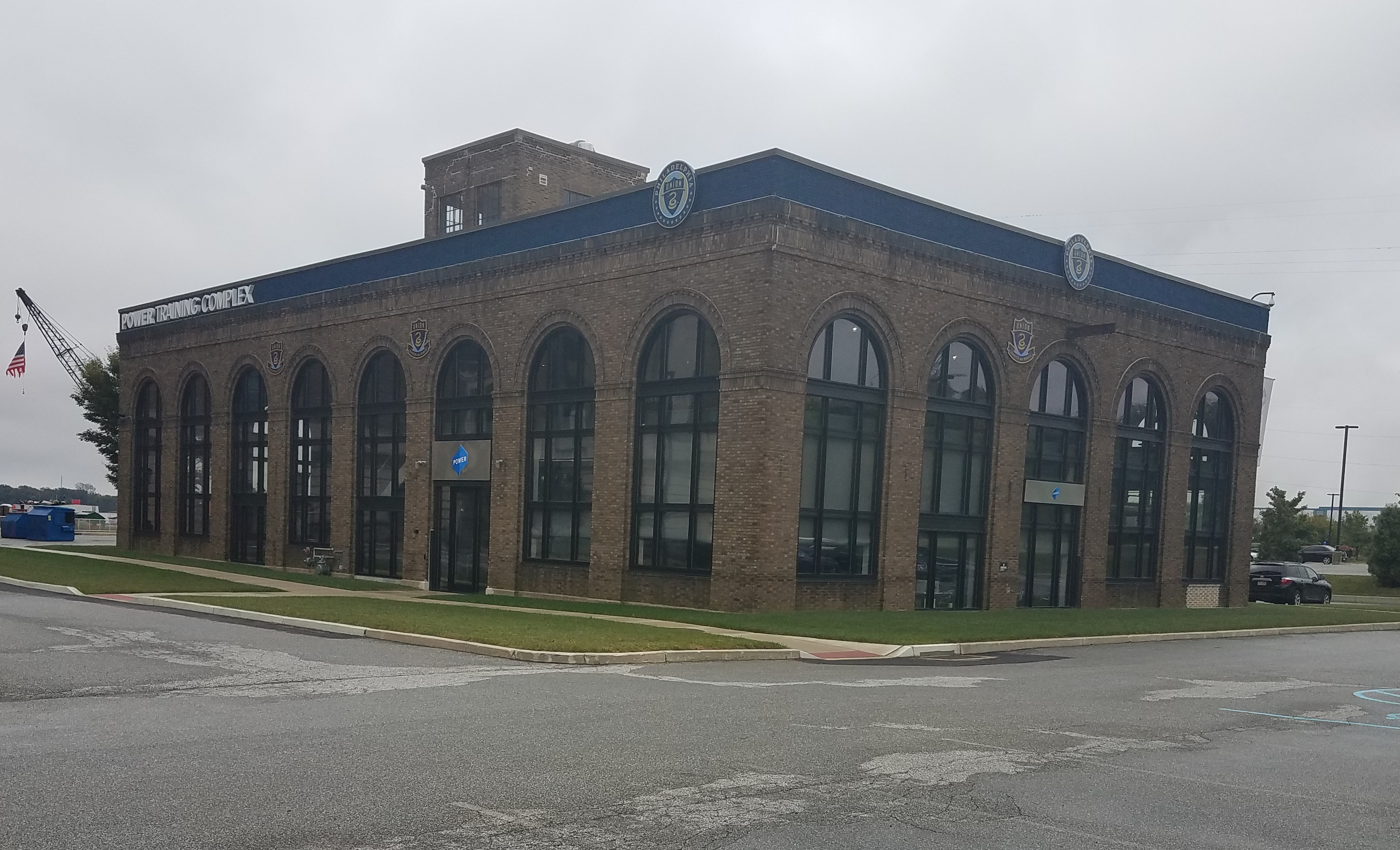
The machine shop of the Chester Waterside Station of the Philadelphia Electric Company

In 2016, the machine shop was converted into a 16,500 square foot indoor training facility and offices for the Philadelphia Union Major League Soccer club.

== See also ==
- HAER−Historic American Engineering Record in Pennsylvania
- List of power stations in Pennsylvania
- National Register of Historic Places listings in Delaware County, Pennsylvania
- Power plants in Pennsylvania
