= Grover Cleveland Bergdoll =

American draft dodger (1893–1966)

Grover Bergdoll
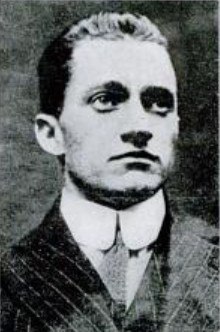
- Bergdoll, taken from his "Wanted" poster
- Born: Grover Cleveland Bergdoll; October 18, 1893 Philadelphia, Pennsylvania, U.S.
- Died: January 15, 1966 (aged 72) Richmond, Virginia, U.S.

Champ Car career
- 2 races run over 3 years
- First race: 1914 Kalamazoo 100 (Kalamazoo)
- Last race: 1915 Providence 100 (Narragansett Park )
Wins	Podiums	Poles
0	0	0

Grover Cleveland Bergdoll (October 18, 1893 – January 27, 1966) was an American socialite, early aviator, and amateur racing driver, who became notorious as a draft dodger in World War I. He was imprisoned for this in 1920 but soon escaped to Germany, not returning to serve his sentence until 1939.

== Biography ==
Bergdoll was born in Philadelphia to a wealthy family, owners of the City Park Brewery and the Bergdoll Mansion. He was one of 119 people to train at the Wright Flying School, and in 1912 he purchased a Wright Model B biplane for $5,000. Bergdoll made several public flights from an airfield on family-owned land outside Philadelphia, and was the first person to fly an airplane between Philadelphia and Atlantic City, New Jersey. After 748 flights the plane was placed in storage.

Bergdoll attempted to qualify for the 1915 Indianapolis 500 and also raced between 1911 and 1916, almost exclusively in his brother Erwin Bergdoll's cars.

Although Bergdoll registered for the draft, he skipped a physical and failed to turn in a questionnaire on his fitness for duty. He was declared a deserter in 1918 (as he never enlisted, he was actually guilty of evading Article 58 of the Selective Service Act of 1917), eluded police for two years, and was arrested at his home in January 1920. After he was found guilty of desertion at a court-martial at Fort Jay on Governors Island in New York City, he was sentenced to five years in prison.

Five months later, military authorities allowed Grover to be released under guard to recover a cache of gold he claimed to have buried near Hagerstown, Maryland. During a stop at his Philadelphia home, he escaped with his chauffeur. Despite a nationwide manhunt, the duo managed to cross the border into Canada and sail to Germany, ultimately finding refuge in Eberbach at a hotel owned by Bergdoll's uncle. Warren G. Harding ordered the seizure of Bergdoll's assets, worth $535,000, under the Trading with the Enemy Act of 1917.

In January 1921, U.S. sergeants Franz Zimmer and Carl Naef sought to kidnap Bergdoll and bring him to an area of Germany that was occupied by the Allies, so he could be returned to the United States. Along with four German men, they ambushed Bergdoll at the Eberbach train station. Bergdoll managed to escape by vehicle, and a passenger named Lena Rupp was shot in the right hand when Naef opened fire on the fleeing car. All six would-be kidnappers were tried and sentenced to prison terms, although the sergeants were soon released due to efforts by the American government.

Another kidnapping attempt was made on August 10, 1923, when Corliss Hooven Griffis of the American Graves Registration Service led a group of four other men (Faust Gagarin, Roger Sperber, John Neilson, and Karl Schmidt) in an effort to capture the fugitive. Two of the men (Schmidt and Sperber) waited in Bergdoll's hotel room in Eberbach to try to seize him, but he managed to shoot both of them, killing Schmidt and seriously wounding Sperber. The four surviving conspirators were seized and sentenced to prison terms. Griffis was widely considered a hero in the United States, and was also released early after a petition effort to free him collected more than two million signatures.

Bergdoll later moved to Weinsberg, Germany. In 1926, he entered a German sanitarium, where he met his future wife, Berta Francks; the couple had five children while he lived in Germany. On two occasions he made secret trips back to Philadelphia. He arrived in 1929 on the first trip and returned in 1933. The second time, he traveled to the U.S. in 1935 and returned to Germany in 1938.

Bergdoll was arrested in May 1939, upon his third return to the U.S. He was nearly returned to Germany after Representative Forest Harness tried to pass legislation barring the reentry of any draft dodgers who had escaped custody and fled to a foreign country. After another court-martial, he was sentenced to serve the remainder of his original term plus three years. He was imprisoned until 1944. Eventually, 80 percent of the property confiscated in 1921 was restored to him.

After his release, Bergdoll lived in Virginia. He died in Richmond, on January 27, 1966, in psychiatric care.

== Later developments ==
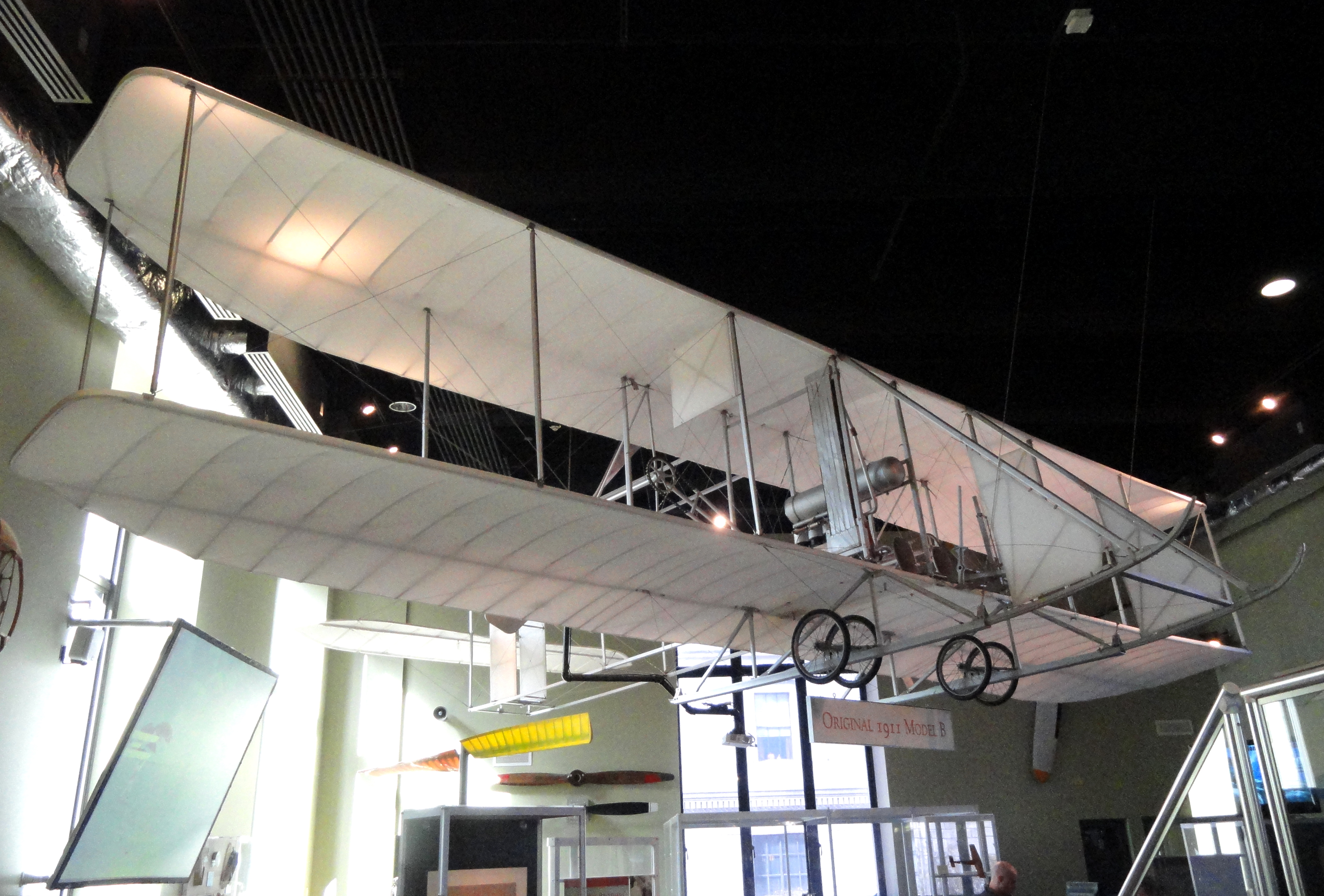
Bergdoll's Model B at the Franklin Institute

Frank C. Williams, the man drafted immediately after Bergdoll by his local draft board, served in World War I as an engineer and survived the conflict. However, the American Legion claimed that the man "drafted in Bergdoll's place" was Russell C. Gross of Philadelphia, the first man drafted after Bergdoll to die in the war. Gross became a private in Company B of the 328th Infantry Regiment, part of the 82nd Division. He was killed in action on October 24, 1918, during the Meuse-Argonne Offensive, and posthumously cited for bravery by Brigadier General Julian Robert Lindsey.

Bergdoll's Wright Model B was rediscovered in the 1930s and restored, and in 1936 donated to the Franklin Institute. In 2024, Bergdoll's descendants demanded it be returned to them, on the basis that there was no documentary evidence that he had donated it to the institute, and that at the time it was under confiscation by the U.S. government and thus ineligible for donation.

== See also ==
- List of aviators
- List of people from Philadelphia
