= Oliver H. Bair Funeral Home =

Historic building in Philadelphia

- U.S. National Register of Historic Places
- Philadelphia Register of Historic Places
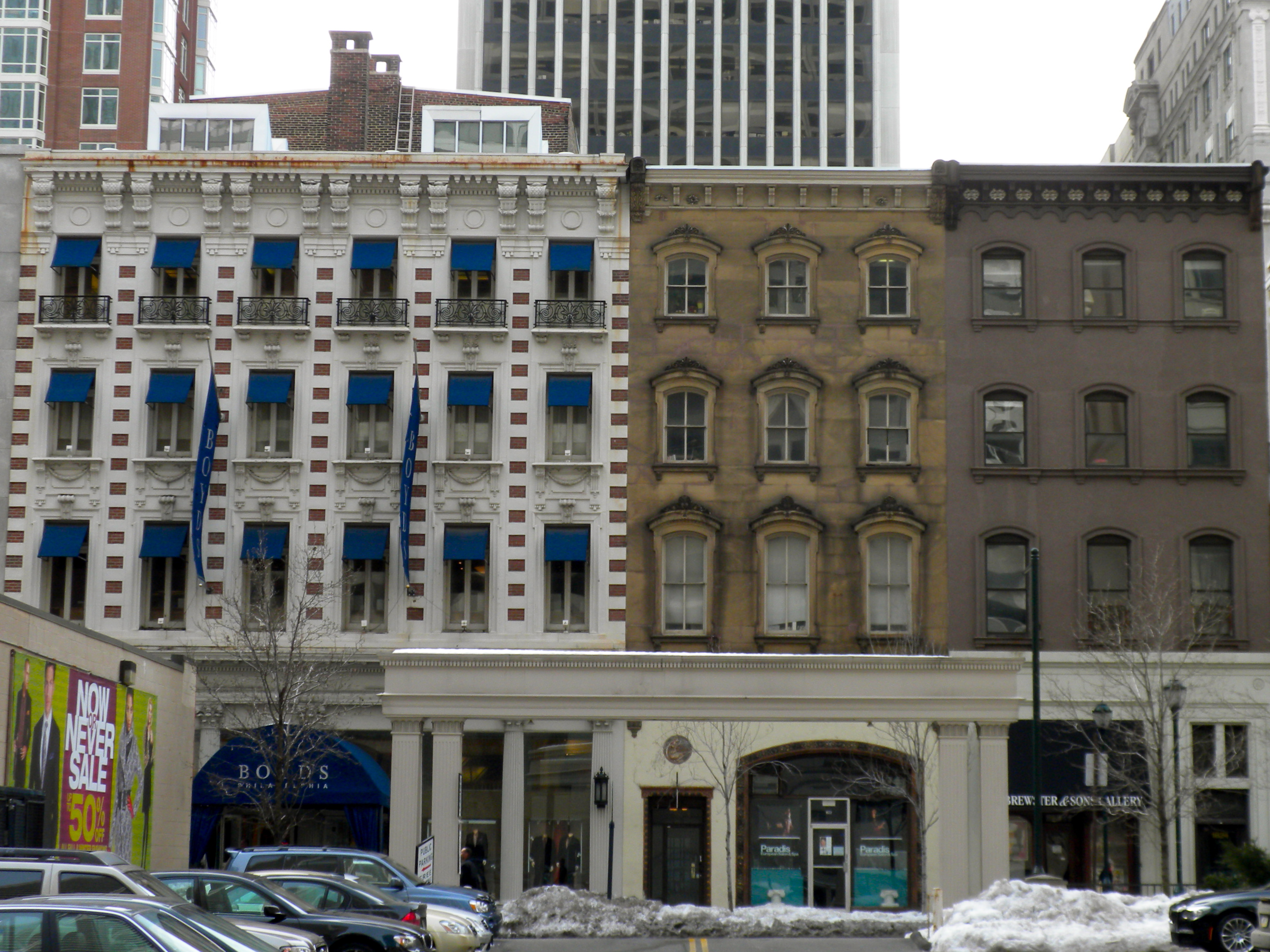

- Location within Philadelphia Location within Pennsylvania Location within the United States
- Location: 1818-1820 Chestnut St., Philadelphia, Pennsylvania
- Coordinates: 39°57′5″N 75°10′18″W
- Area: less than one acre
- Built: 1907
- Architect: John T. Windrim
- Architectural style: Renaissance
- NRHP reference No.: 82001542

Significant dates
- Added to NRHP: November 14, 1982
- Designated PRHP: February 8, 1995

The Oliver H. Bair Funeral Home is an historic building in Philadelphia, Pennsylvania, United States.

== History and architectural features ==
The five-story building, which was built in 1907 from the designs of architect John T. Windrim, was listed on the National Register of Historic Places in 1982. It was added to the Philadelphia Register of Historic Places on February 8, 1995.

The building is now occupied by luxury department clothing store Boyds Philadelphia. The funeral home company has moved to Upper Darby Township, Pennsylvania, United States.
