= North American Building =

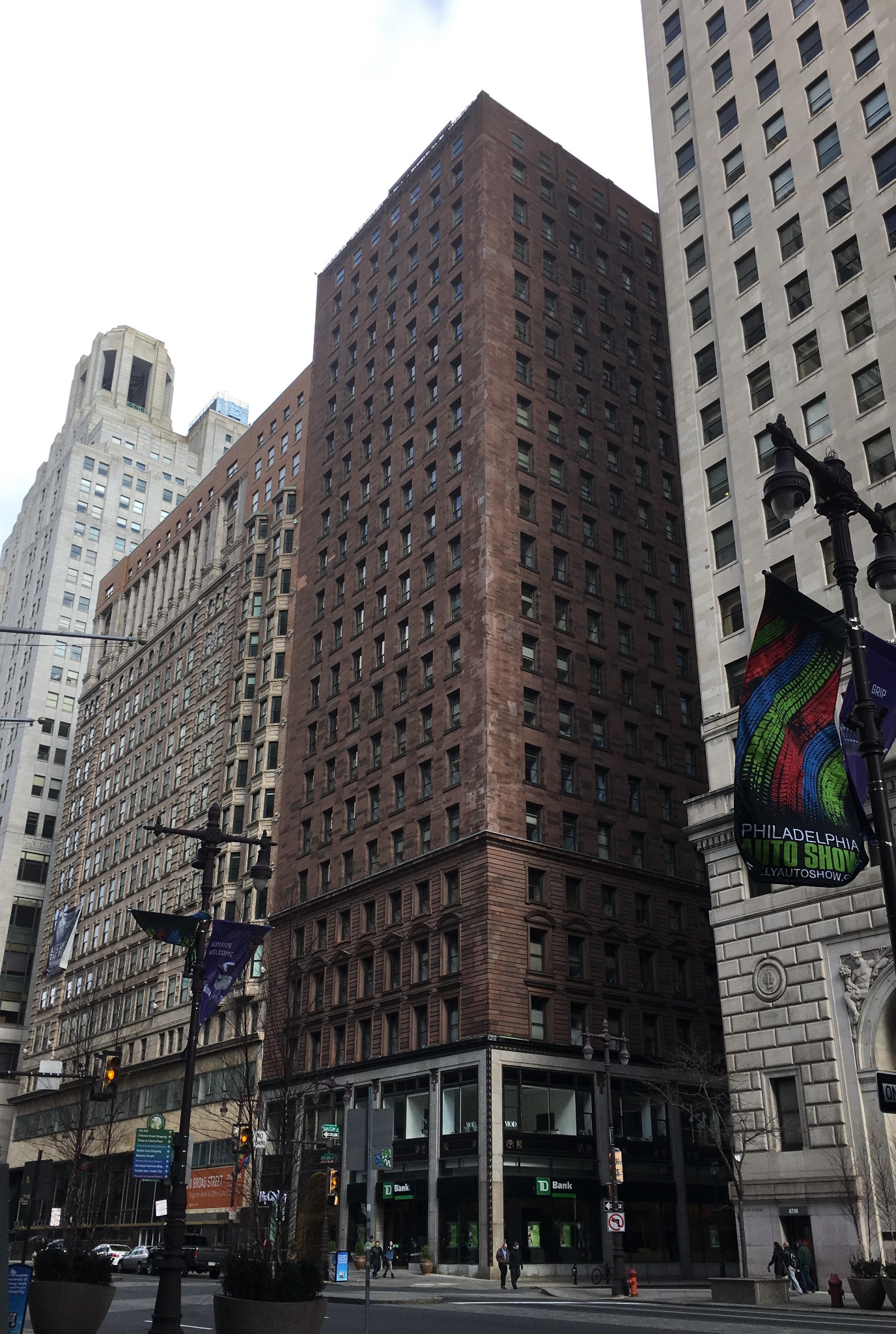

- Location within Philadelphia North American Building (Pennsylvania) North American Building (the United States)

General information
- Status: Completed
- Type: Commercial offices
- Architectural style: Chicago school
- Location: 121 S. Broad Street; Philadelphia, Pennsylvania
- Coordinates: 39.9503°N 75.1637°W
- Construction started: 1900
- Completed: 1900

Height
- Roof: 81 m (266 ft)

Technical details
- Floor count: 21
- Floor area: 142,084 sq ft (13,200.0 m^{2})

Design and construction
- Architect: James H. Windrim
- Developer: Thomas B. Wanamaker

The North American Building is an 81 m (266 ft), 21-story, historic high-rise building at 121 South Broad Street in Philadelphia, Pennsylvania. The building was designed by Philadelphia architect James H. Windrim (1840–1919) as the headquarters of the newspaper The North American and commissioned by Thomas B. Wanamaker, the newspaper's publisher and son of John Wanamaker, the department store founder.

== See also ==
- List of tallest buildings in Philadelphia
