= James H. Windrim =

American architect

James Hamilton Windrim
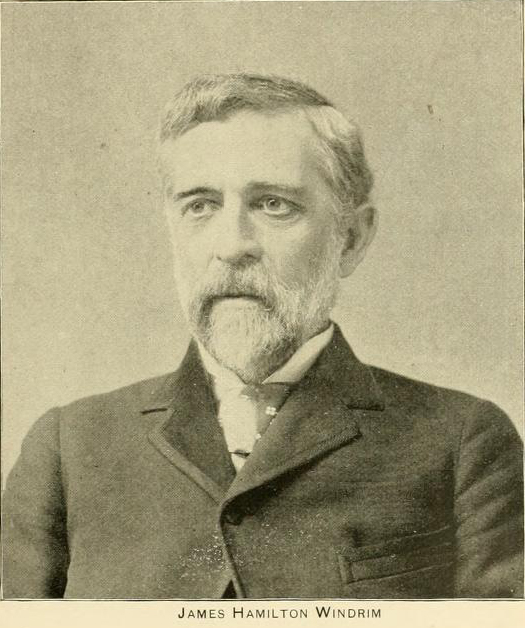
- Born: January 4, 1840; Philadelphia County, Pennsylvania, U.S.
- Died: April 26, 1919 (aged 79); Philadelphia, Pennsylvania, U.S.
- Resting place: West Laurel Hill Cemetery, Bala Cynwyd, Pennsylvania, U.S.
- Education: Girard College
- Occupation: architect
- Spouse: Mary Barr McCutcheon Windrim
- Children: 3, including John T. Windrim
- Buildings: Masonic Temple (Philadelphia), U.S. Treasury (Philadelphia), National Savings and Trust Company (Washington, DC)

James Hamilton Windrim (January 4, 1840 – April 26, 1919) was a Philadelphia architect who specialized in public buildings, including the Masonic Temple in Philadelphia and the U.S. Treasury. A number of the buildings he designed are on the National Historic Landmarks and/or the National Register of Historic Places, including the Masonic Temple in Philadelphia and the National Savings and Trust Company building in Washington, DC.

== Early life and education ==
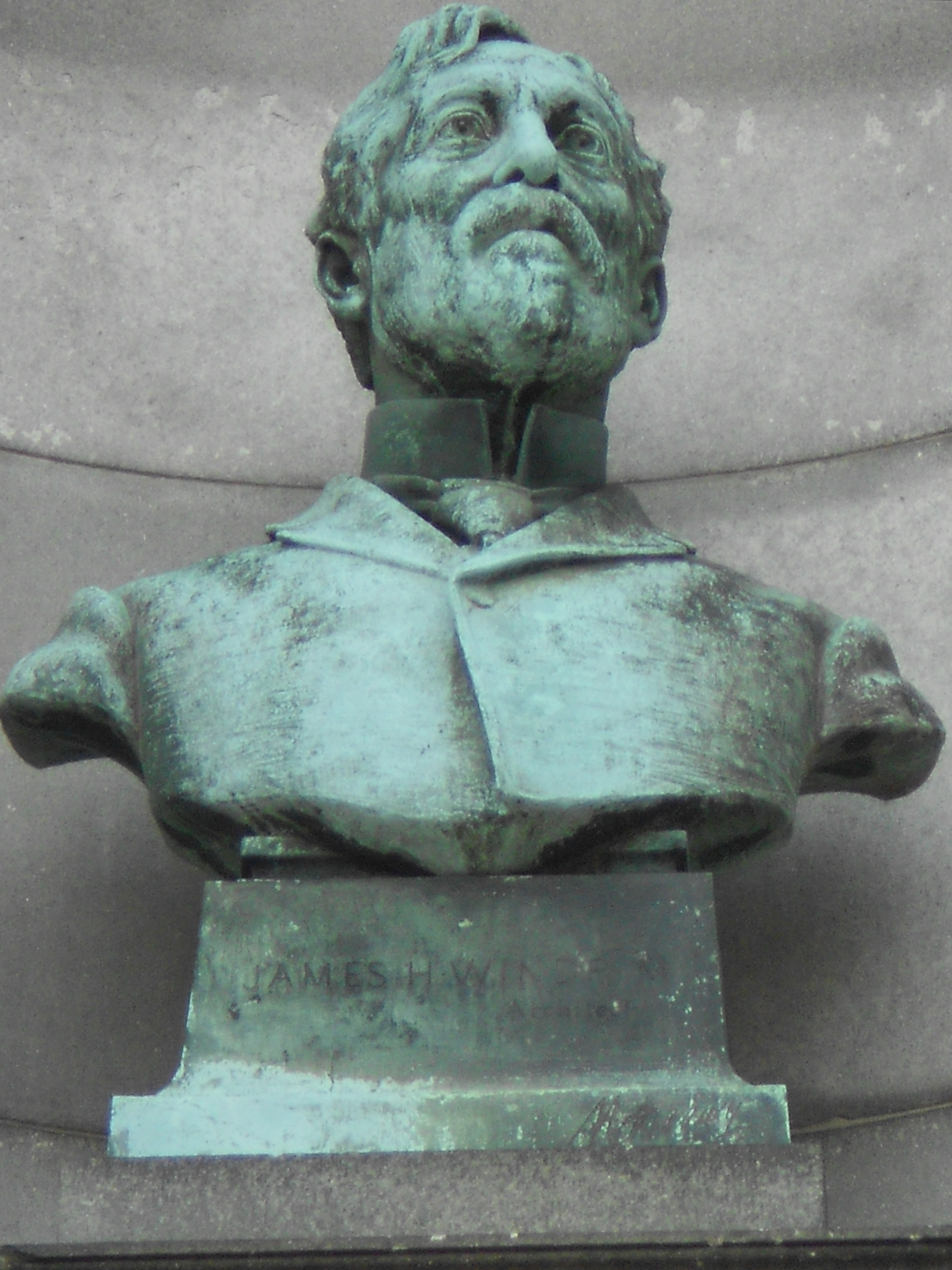
Bust of James H. Windrim, a bust of Windrim built between 1898 and 1901 by Samuel Murray

Born in Philadelphia, he apprenticed under John Notman.

== Career ==
In 1867, he opened his own firm. That same year, at age 27, he won the design competition for the Philadelphia Masonic Temple, the building for which he is best remembered.

In 1871, he was named architect for the Stephen Girard Estate, designing several buildings at Girard College and a complex of stores on Market Street that became Snellenburg's Department Store.

As supervising architect for the U.S. Treasury Department in Washington, D.C. from 1889 to 1891, he was responsible for all U.S. federal government construction. He designed at least 16 federal buildings across the country that consolidated post offices, federal offices, and federal courts. He then returned to his native Philadelphia, where he served as director of public works for the City of Philadelphia from 1891 to 1895.

He served as president of the Philadelphia Chapter of the American Institute of Architects from 1879 to 1886. His son, John T. Windrim, joined his architectural firm, James H. Windrim & Son, in 1882, and took over after his retirement.

Windrim designed the Smith Memorial Arch in West Fairmount Park in Philadelphia, one of the nation's largest public parks. The arch features a bronze bust of him developed by sculptor Samuel Murray.

== Death ==
Windrim died in Philadelphia on April 26, 1919, at age 79. He is buried in Bala Cynwyd, PA at Laurel Hill West Cemetery in the Marlborough section.

== Selected works ==
=== Philadelphia buildings ===
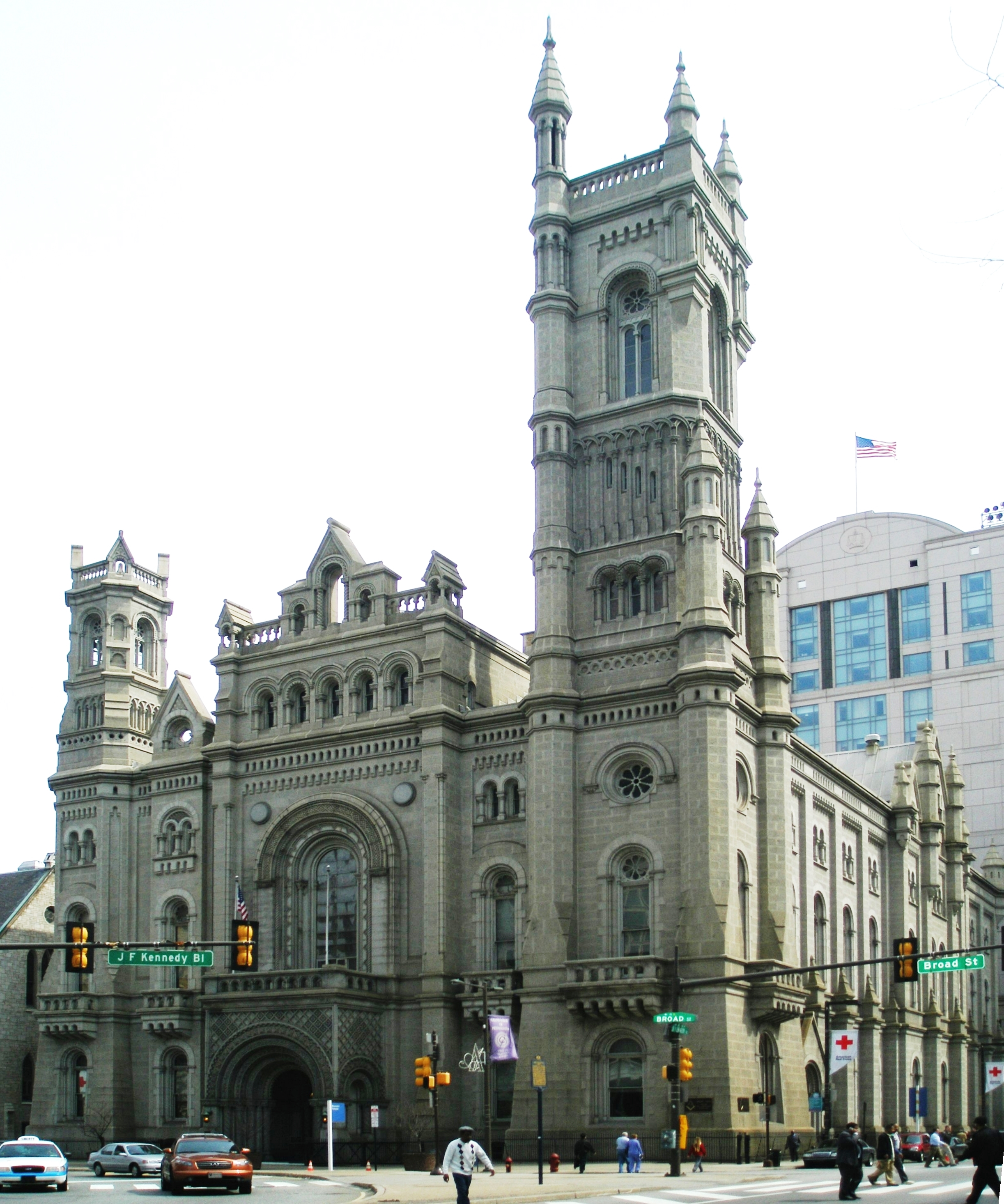
Philadelphia Masonic Temple in Philadelphia, designed by Windrim between 1868 and 1873

- Philadelphia Masonic Temple, NE corner Broad and Filbert Streets (1868–73).
- Academy of Natural Sciences, 1900 Logan Square (now Logan Circle) (1868–72).
- Kemble-Bergdoll Mansion, 2201–05 Green Street, (ca. 1885). Windrim added the carriage house in 1889.
- Falls Bridge over Schuylkill River, Fairmount Park (1894–95), with George S. Webster, chief engineer, City of Philadelphia.
- Smith Memorial Playground & Playhouse, Reservoir Drive, East Fairmount Park (1898–99).
- Smith Memorial Arch (Civil War Memorial), South Concourse and Lansdowne Drive, West Fairmount Park (1898–1912), with John T. Windrim.
- North American Building, 121 South Broad Street (1900). This was the tallest building in Philadelphia for about a year, until the 1901 completion of City Hall Tower. Commonwealth Title & Trust Company Building, 1201-05 Chestnut Street (1901–06), with John T. Windrim.
- Main Building, Thomas Jefferson University Hospital, 132 South 10th Street (1903).
- Lafayette Building, NE corner Fifth and Chestnut Streets (1907–08), with John T. Windrim.

=== Demolished Philadelphia buildings ===
- Philadelphia Trust, Safe Deposit and Insurance Company, 415 Chestnut Street (1873–74, demolished 1959).
- Agricultural Hall, Centennial Exposition, West Fairmount Park (1875–76, demolished).
- Snellenberg's Department Store, 1100-42 Market Street (1886–87, remodeled and upper floors demolished 1960s, remainder demolished 2015). Built by the Stephen Girard Estate.
- Western Saving Fund Society, 1000–08 Walnut Street (ca. 1887, demolished 1967).
- Bank of North America, 305–07 Chestnut Street (1893–95, demolished 1972), with John T. Windrim.

=== Buildings elsewhere ===
- National Saving And Trust Company, New York Avenue and Fifteenth Street NW, Washington, D.C. (1888).
- U.S. Post Office and Courthouse (now Paul Laxalt State Building), 401 Carson Street, Carson City, Nevada (1888–91), designed by Mifflin E. Bell, completed by Windrim.
- Altoona Masonic Temple, 1111–19 Eleventh Street, Altoona, Pennsylvania (1889–90).
- U.S. Post Office and Courthouse (now Abingdon Police Department), 425 West Main Street, Abingdon, Virginia (1889–90), with Will A. Freret.
- U.S. Post Office and Courthouse (now Lancaster Municipal Building), 120 North Duke Street, Lancaster, Pennsylvania (1889–92).
- U.S. Post Office and Courthouse (now Mississippi River Commission Building), 1400 Walnut Street, Vicksburg, Mississippi (1890–92).
- U.S. Post Office and Courthouse, Scranton, Pennsylvania (1890–94, demolished 1930).
- U.S. Post Office and Courthouse (Detroit Federal Building), Shelby & Fort Streets, Detroit, Michigan (1890–97, demolished 1931).
- U.S. Post Office and Courthouse (now Springfield City Hall), 830 Boonville Avenue, Springfield, Missouri (1891–94), with Willoughby J. Edbrooke.
- U.S. Post Office and Courthouse, Sacramento, California (1891–94, demolished 1966).
- U.S. Government Building for Columbian Exposition, Jackson Park, Chicago, Illinois, 1893, Ralph, Julian; Chicago and the World’s Fair Harper & Brothers, 1892, New York p238
- U.S. Post Office and Courthouse, Winona, Minnesota (1890-91, demolished 1963).
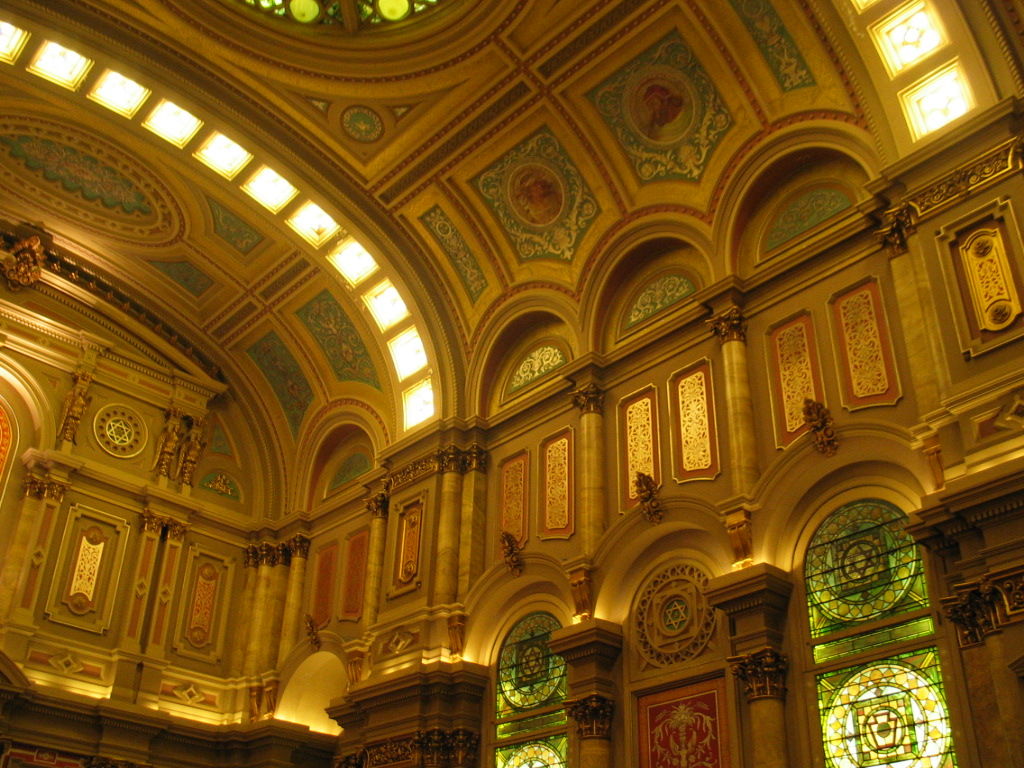
Interior of Philadelphia Masonic Temple (1868–73).

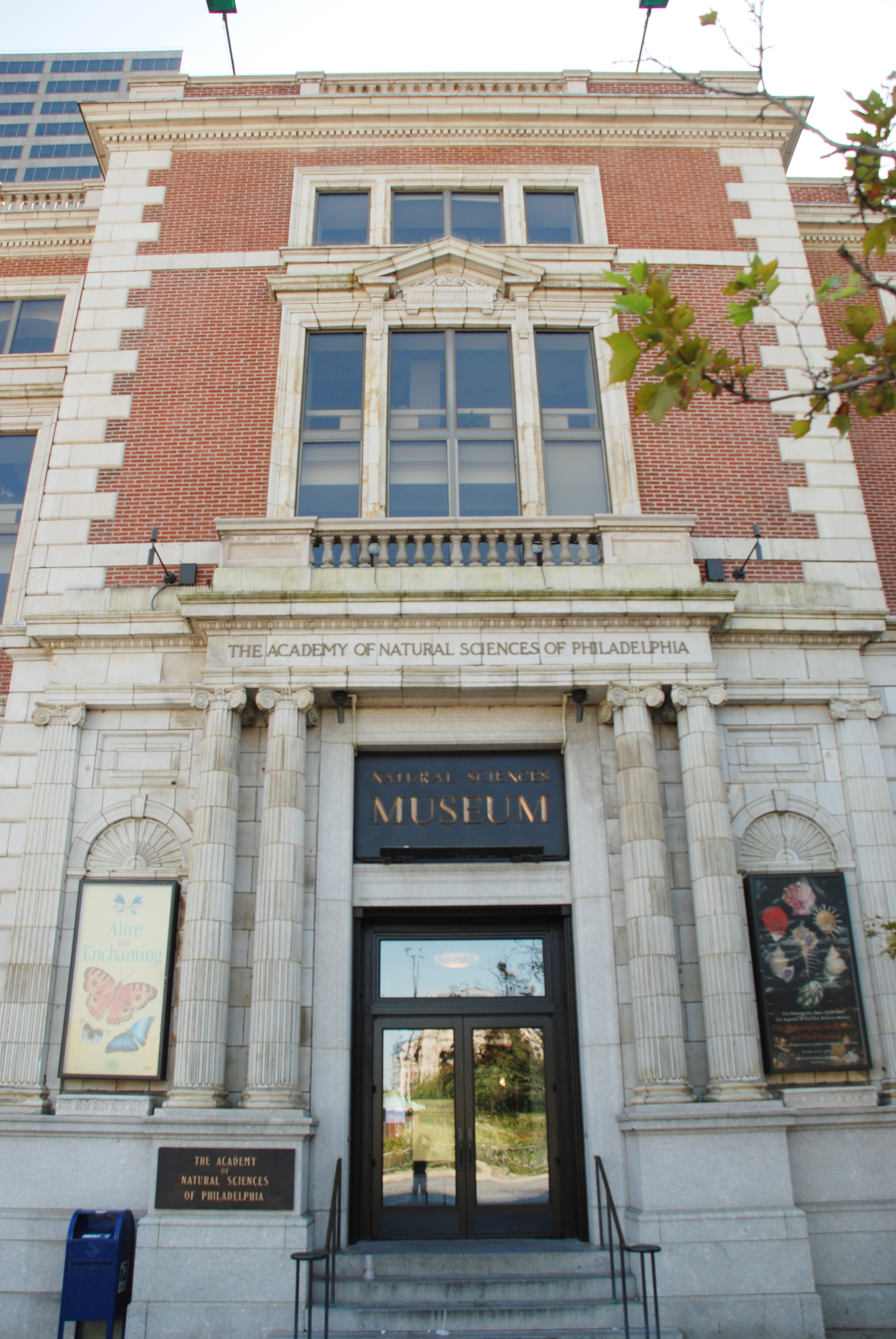
Academy of Natural Sciences, Philadelphia, PA (1868–72).

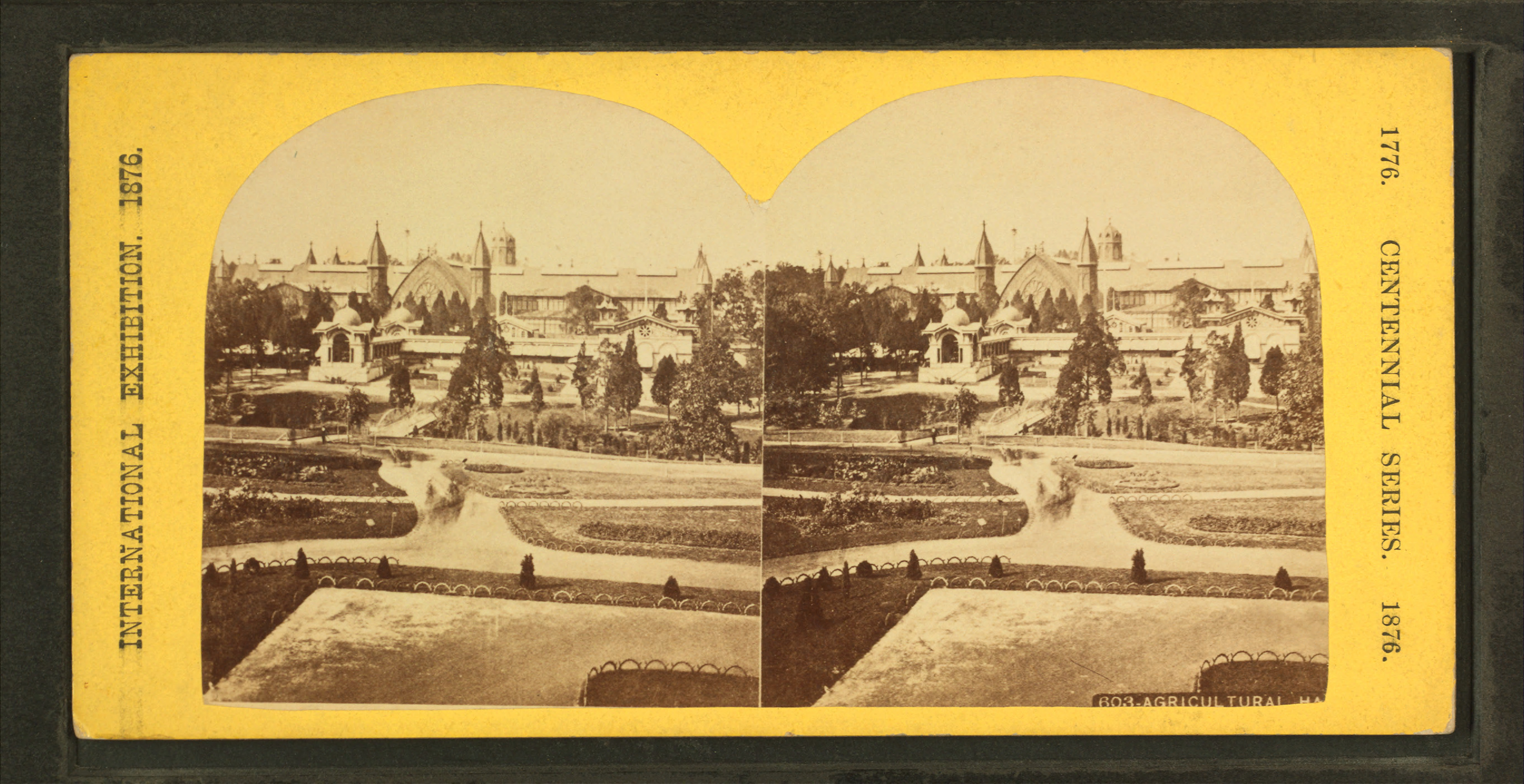
Agricultural Hall, Centennial Exposition, Philadelphia, PA (1875–76, demolished).

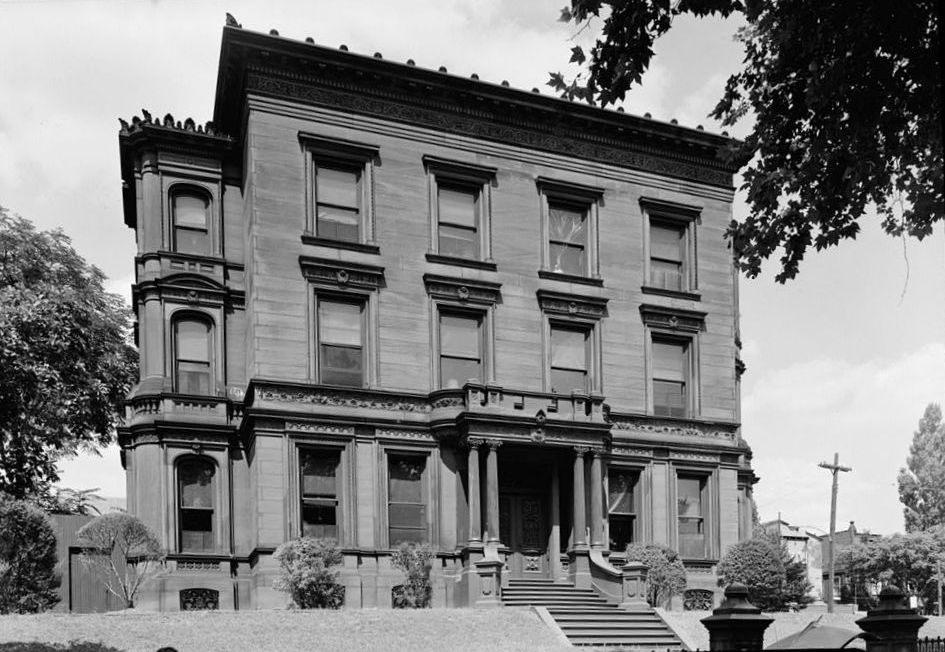
Kemble-Bergdol Mansion, 2201-05 Green St., Philadelphia, PA (ca. 1885).

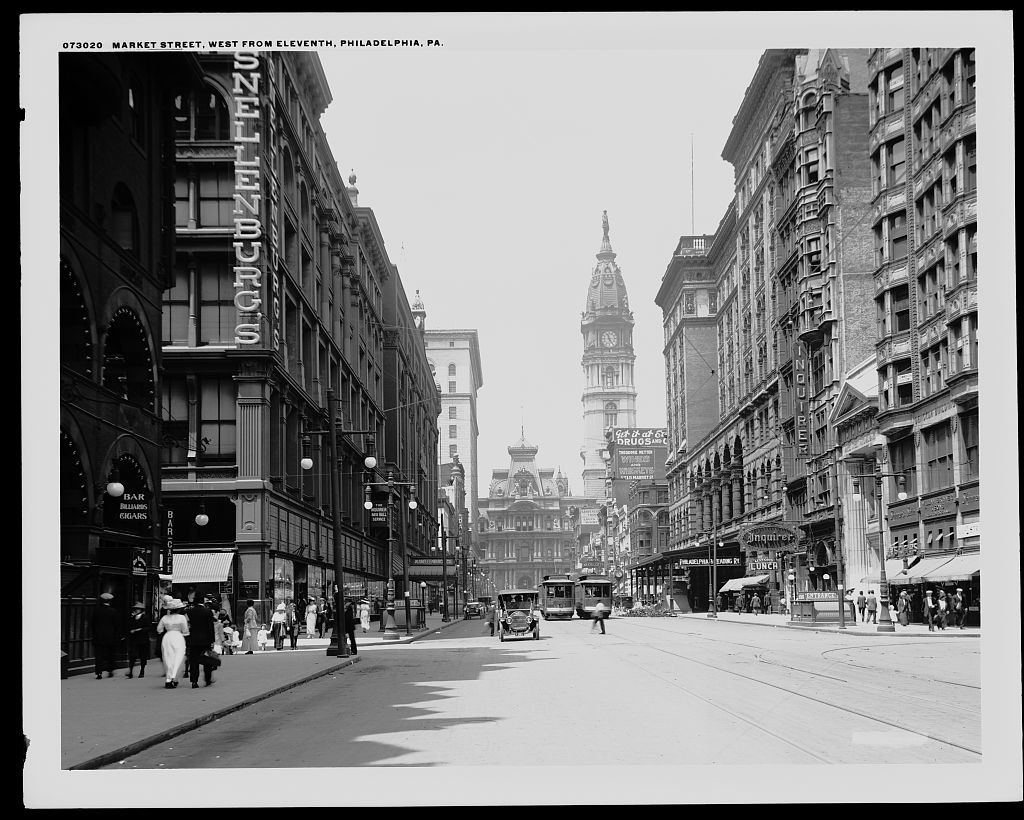
Snellenburg's Department Store, Philadelphia, PA (1886–87, demolished), in a circa 1915 photograph.

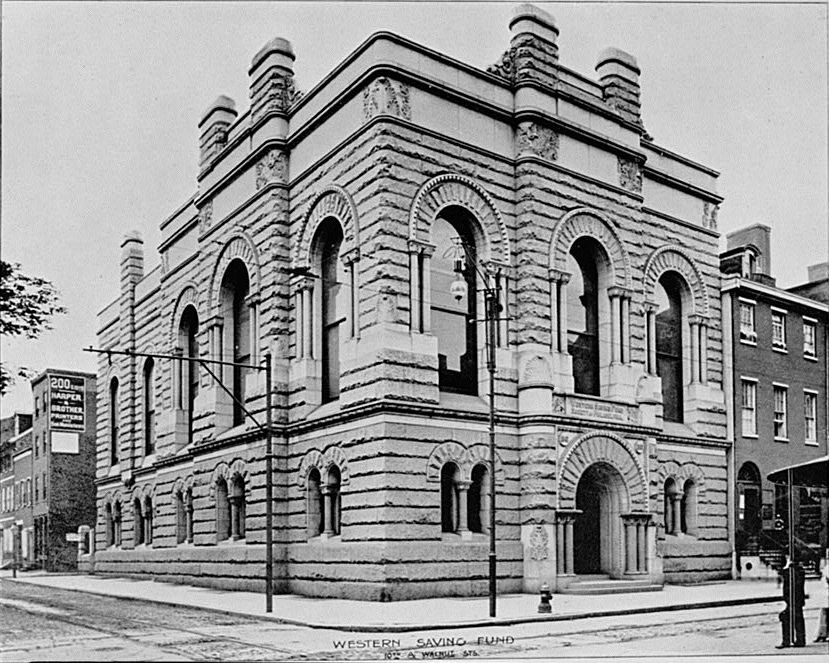
Western Saving Fund Society, Philadelphia, PA (ca. 1887, demolished 1967), before 1910 expansion.

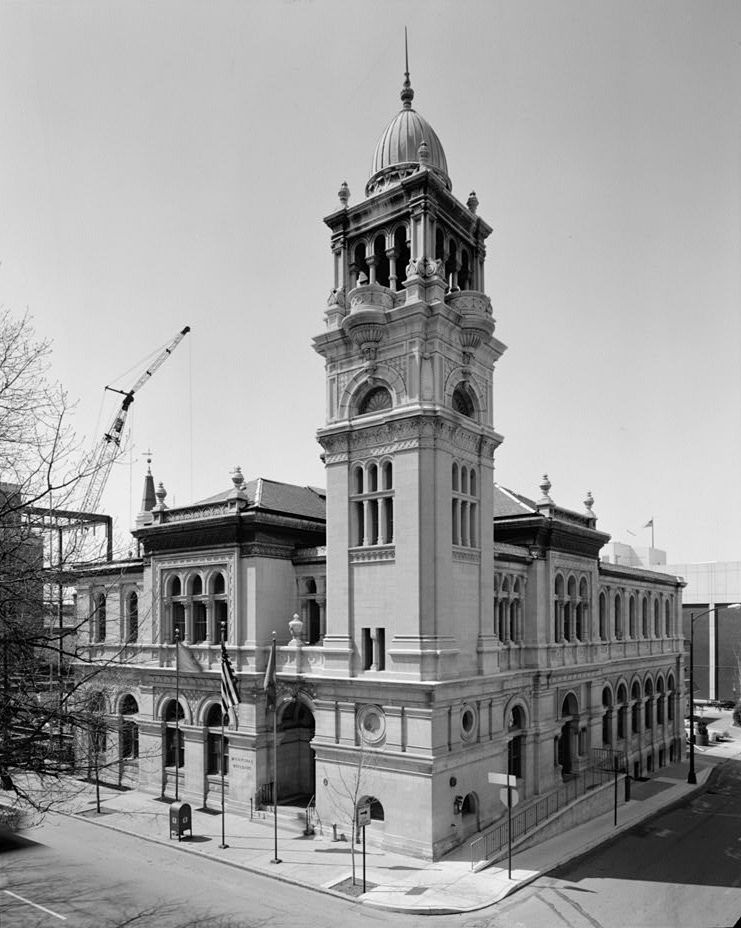
U.S. Post Office and Courthouse (now Lancaster Municipal Building), Lancaster, PA (1889–92).

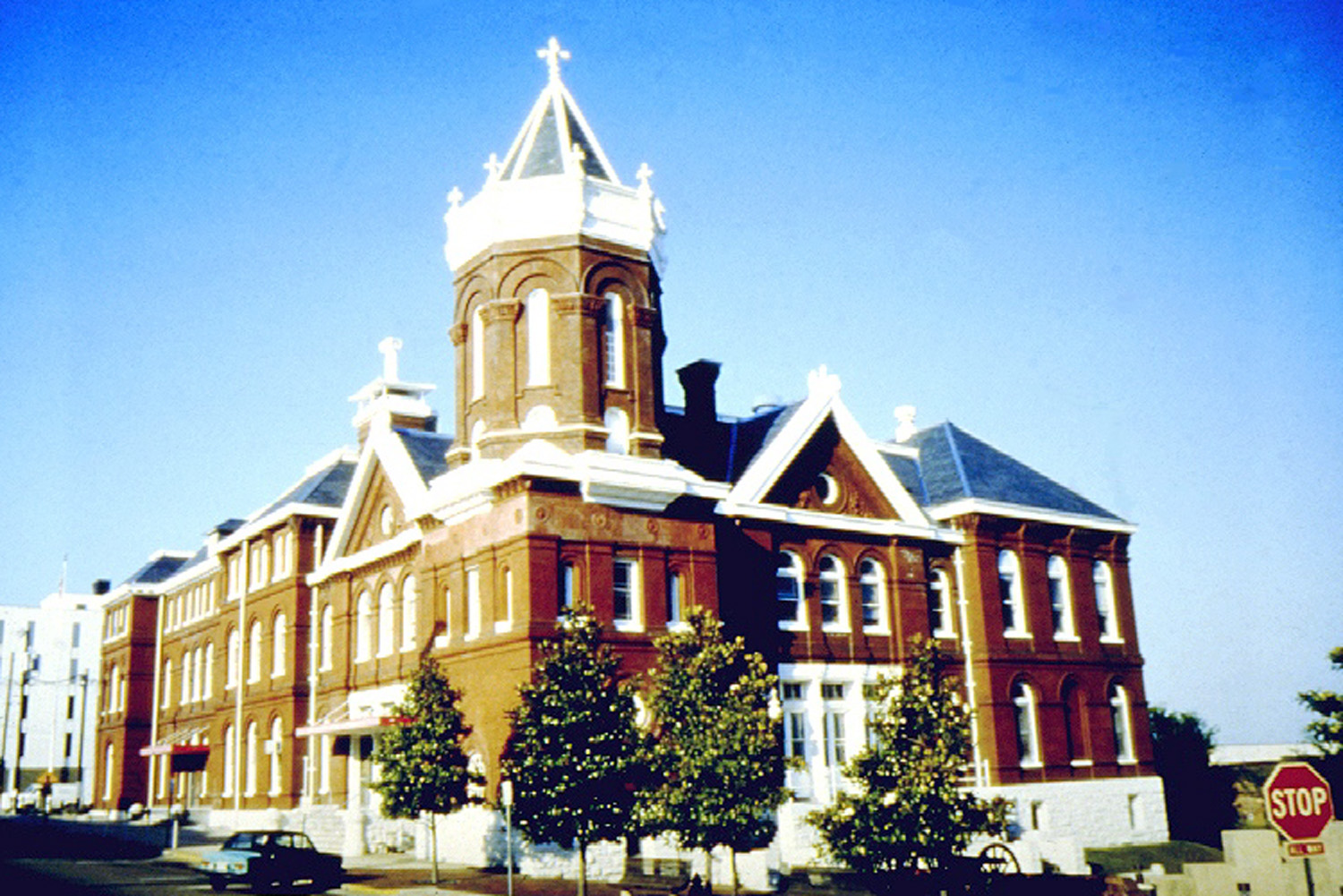
U.S. Post Office and Courthouse (now Mississippi River Commission Building), Vicksburg, MS (1890–92).

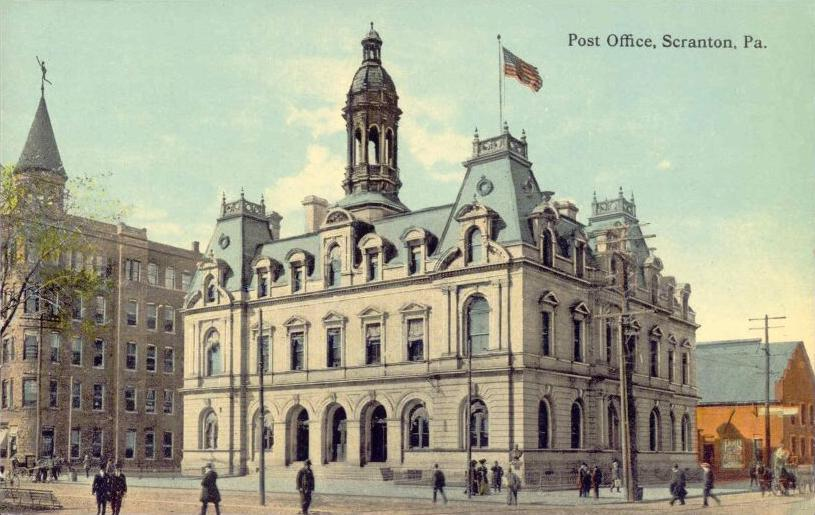
U.S. Post Office and Courthouse, Scranton, PA (1890–94, demolished 1930).

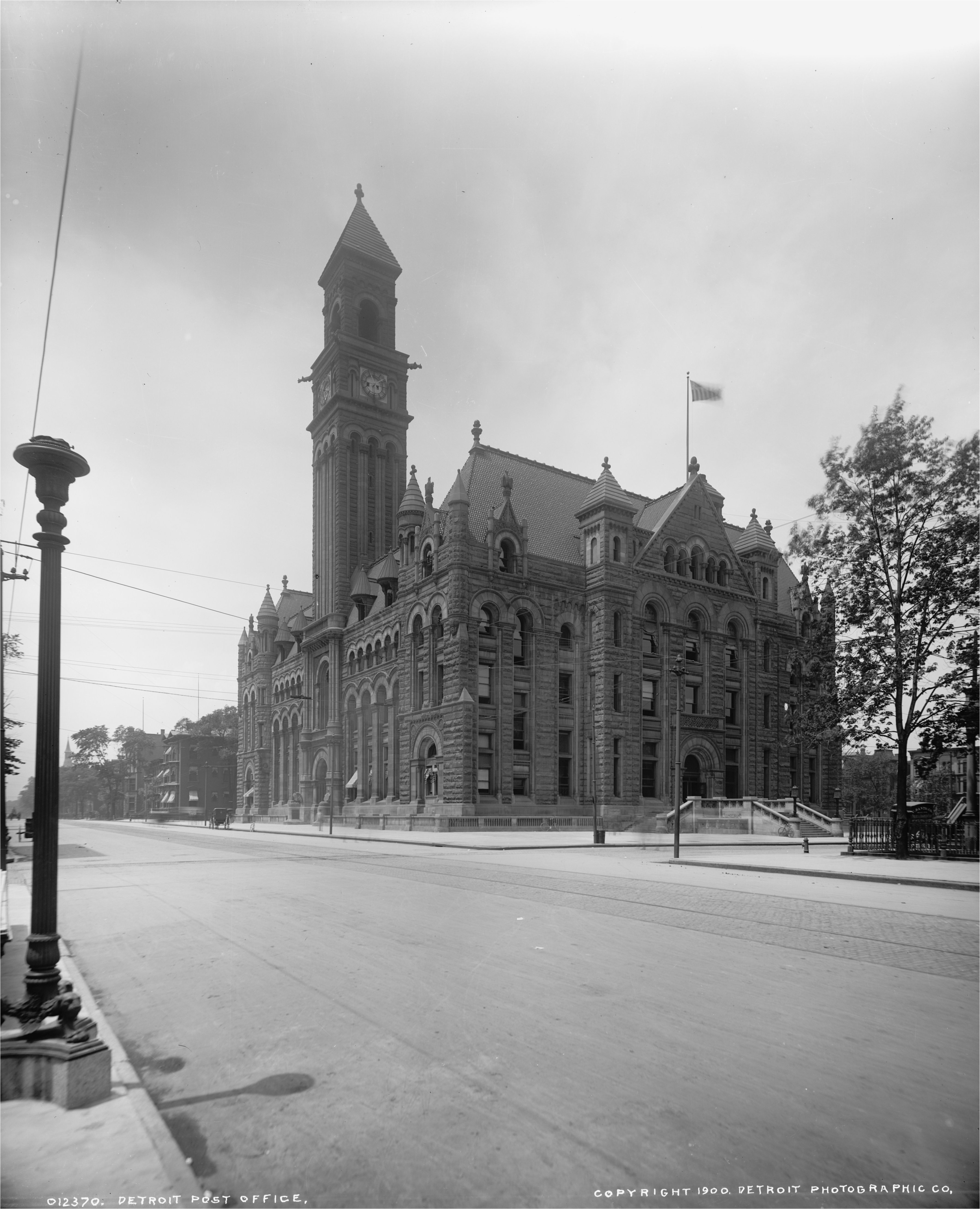
U.S. Post Office and Courthouse (Detroit Federal Building), Detroit, Michigan (1890–97, demolished 1931).

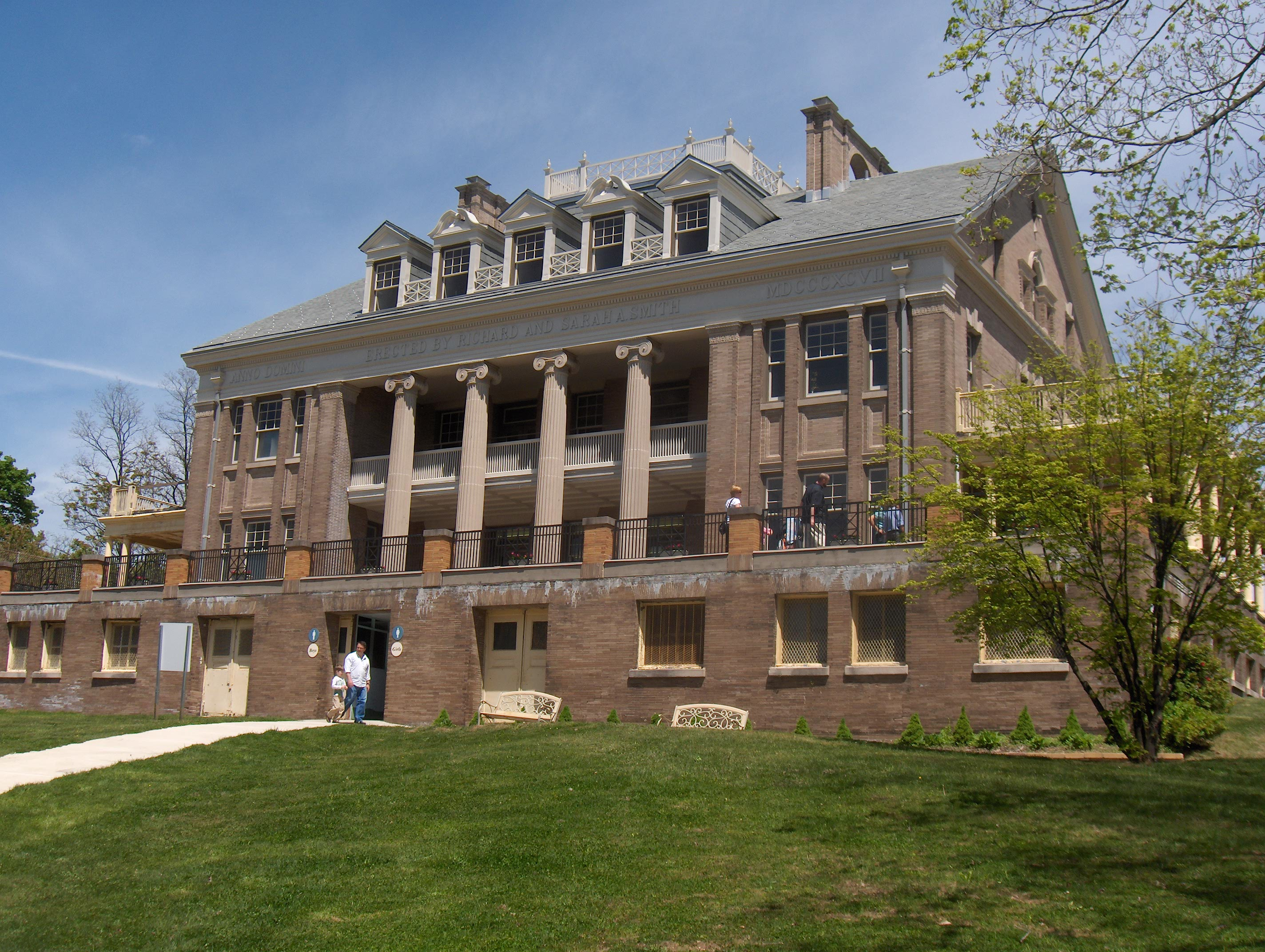
Smith Memorial Playground & Playhouse, Philadelphia, PA (1898–99).

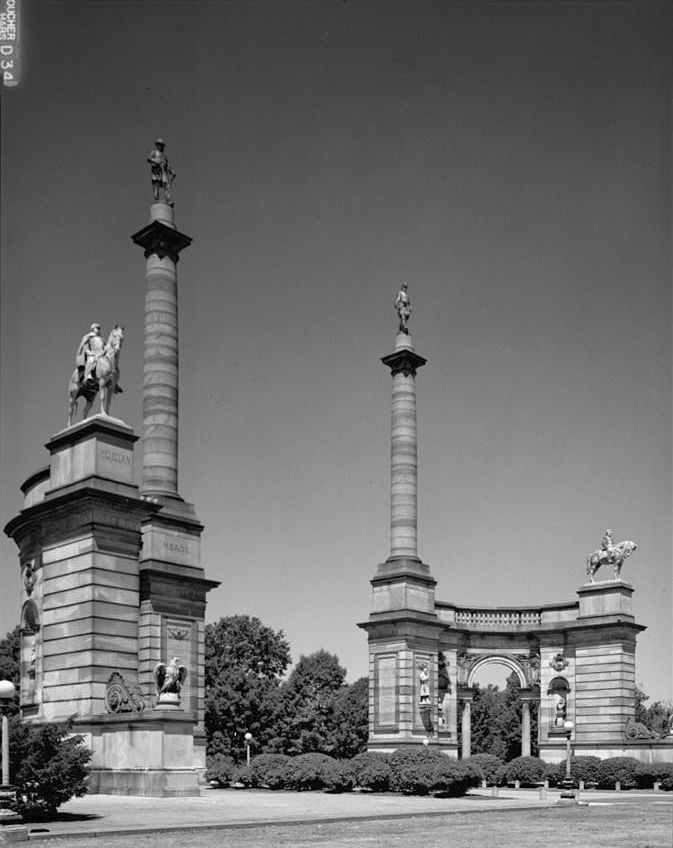
Smith Memorial Arch (Civil War Memorial), Philadelphia, PA (1898-1912).

Preceded by William A. Freret	Office of the Supervising Architect; 1889–1891	Succeeded by Willoughby J. Edbrooke
