= City Park Brewery =

- U.S. National Register of Historic Places
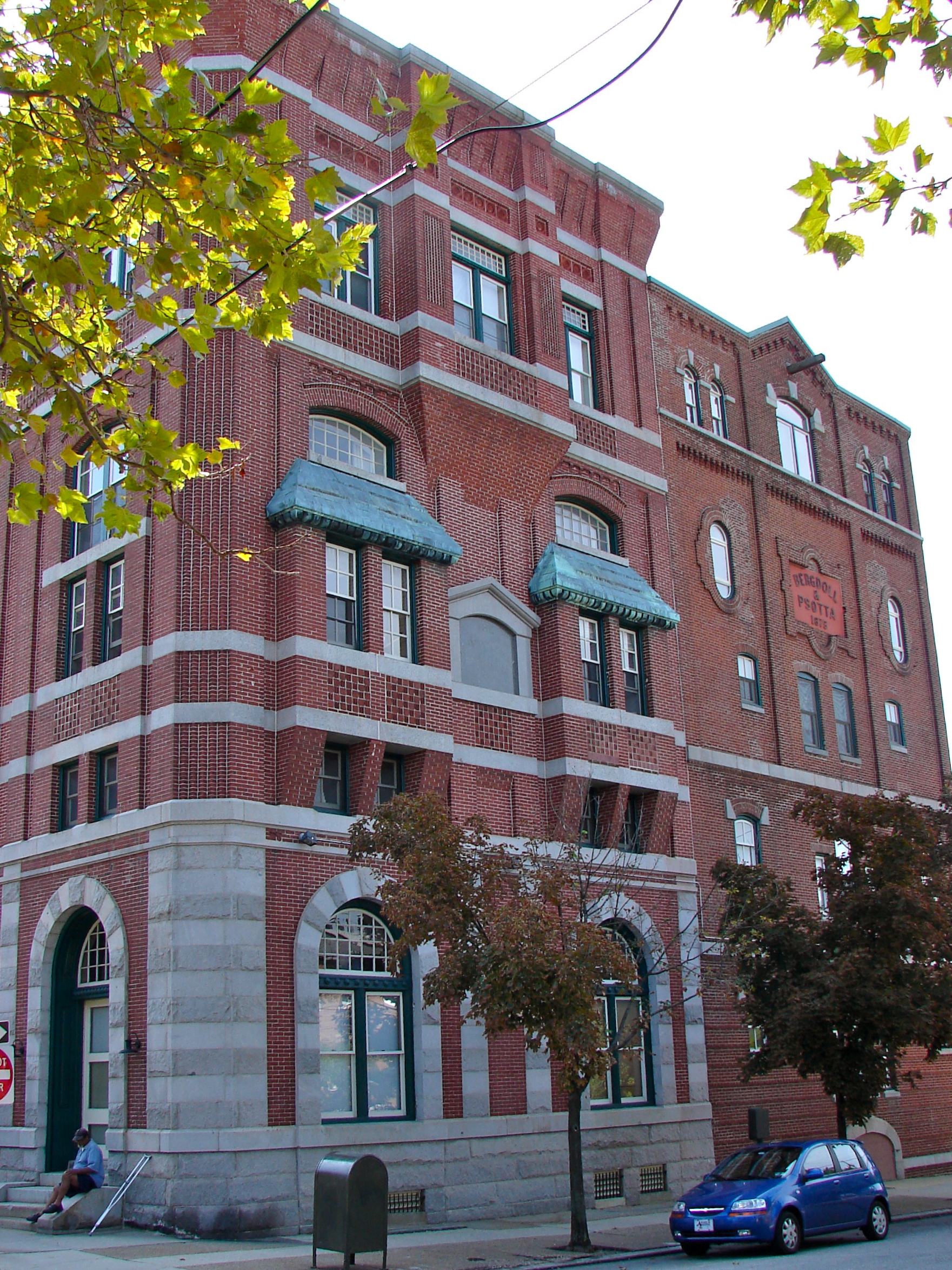

- Location within Philadelphia Location within Pennsylvania Location within the United States
- Location: Roughly bounded by Pennsylvania Ave., 28th, 30th, and Poplar Sts., Philadelphia, Pennsylvania
- Coordinates: 39°58′19″N 75°11′3″W
- Area: 1.5 acres (0.61 ha)
- Built: 1856
- Architectural style: Romanesque, Italian Romanesque
- NRHP reference No.: 80003609
- Added to NRHP: July 18, 1980

City Park Brewery, also known as the Louis Bergdoll Brewing Company, was a brewery in North Philadelphia, built in 1856. Several brewery buildings were added to the National Register of Historic Places in 1980 as a historic district. Louis J. Bergdoll started his brewery business in 1849 at 508 Vine Street, Philadelphia, and briefly operated as Bergdoll and Schemm. From 1856 until Charles Psotta's death in 1876, the firm was known as Bergdoll and Psotta. In 1856 the firm built new quarters on 28th and 29th Streets near Fairmount Park and the Schuylkill River. In 1881 the firm was incorporated as City Park Brewery. Louis Bergdoff died in 1894, but the firm continued to operate as a brewery until Prohibition in 1920, and then for a single year after the repeal of Prohibition, in 1934.

Several of the brewery buildings are now condominiums, including the "Brewery - Main Building" at 825 N. 29th Street (SE corner of 29th and Parrish) and "The Brewery House" on 28th Street between Parrish and Poplar Streets. A couple of blocks north of the historic district, at 929 North 29th Street, the Queen Anne style Louis J. Bergdoll House, built 1885, is listed separately by the NRHP. The Italianate style Bergdoll Mansion, built in 1890 at 2201–2205 Green Street about 10 blocks southeast of the brewery, is also listed separately on the NRHP.

== See also ==
- List of defunct breweries in the United States
