= Philadelphia Federal Credit Union =

- Type: Credit union
- Industry: Financial services
- Founded: April 16, 1951; 75 years ago in Philadelphia, Pennsylvania, United States
- Headquarters: Philadelphia, Pennsylvania, United States
- Key people: Patricia Craven – President; Bernard Lester – Chairman; Joseph F. McHugh Jr. – Former Treasurer
- Net income: US$9.39 million (2024) ▼
- Total assets: US$1.71 billion (2024) ▲
- Total equity: US$201 million (2024) ▲
- Number of employees: 289 (269 full-time, 20 part-time; 2025)
- Website: pfcu.com

Philadelphia Federal Credit Union (PFCU) is a credit union headquartered in Philadelphia, Pennsylvania. As of September 30, 2024, it reported $1.71 billion in assets, making it the sixth-largest credit union in the Philadelphia region and the ninth-largest in Pennsylvania. PFCU operates 12 branches across the city and surrounding areas.

== Services ==
Philadelphia Federal Credit Union provides traditional credit union services including checking and savings accounts, consumer loans, mortgages, and credit cards. Credit cards are issued through Elan Financial Services, a third-party provider.

The credit union also offers investment referrals through financial professionals affiliated with LPL Financial LLC, an independent broker-dealer.

PFCU promotes private student loans in partnership with Sallie Mae Bank and other lenders. Philadelphia Federal Credit Union is not the creditor for these loans but receives compensation from Sallie Mae for loan referrals.

== Financials ==
As of September 30, 2024, PFCU reported US$1.71 billion in assets, US$201 million in equity, and net income of US$9.39 million.

=== Financial trends ===
Recent net income figures show notable volatility:

Net income trends (audited)
Year	Net income (US$ M)
2018	15.4 ▲
2019	17.8 ▲
2020	3.1 ▼
2021	19.6 ▲
2022	16.7 ▼
2023	10.3 ▼
2024	9.4 ▼

In total, net income fell in four of the past six years, with only a single large rebound in 2021, which was primarily attributed to post-COVID recovery and a low interest rate environment.

== History ==
Philadelphia Federal Credit Union was founded on April 16, 1951, to serve Philadelphia municipal employees.

During the late 20th century and early 2000s, PFCU expanded through a series of mergers, including with Temple Employees Federal Credit Union in 1983, Community Concern #13 FCU in 1989, Health & Human Service FCU in 1990, Afserco Staff FCU in 2004, and New Bethel AME FCU in 2012.

In the 2000s, PFCU broadened its services to include mortgages, credit cards (issued through Elan Financial Services), investment referrals (via LPL Financial), and private student loan partnerships with Sallie Mae.

By 2025, PFCU served over 120,000 members across 12 branches and reported $1.71 billion in assets.
