= Bergdoll Mansion =

Historic house in Pennsylvania, United States

- U.S. National Register of Historic Places
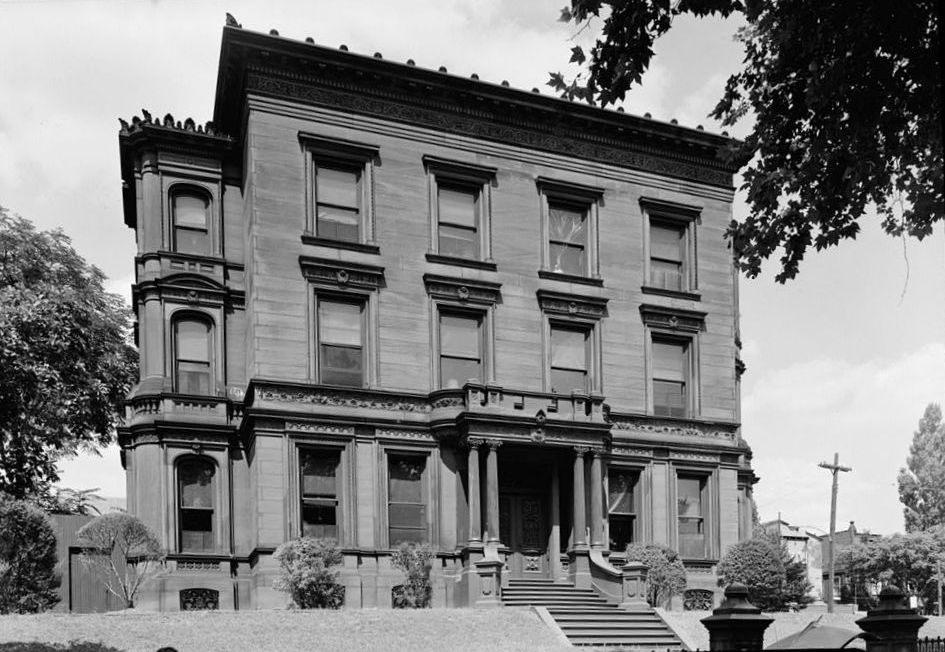
- Bergdoll Mansion, HABS Photo, 1963

- Location within Philadelphia Location within Pennsylvania Location within the United States
- Location: 2201–2205 Green Street, Philadelphia, Pennsylvania
- Coordinates: 39°57′56″N 75°10′29″W
- Area: 14,000 sq ft
- Built: 1886
- Architect: James H. Windrim; Reeves, Stacey, & Sons
- Architectural style: Beaux Arts, Italianate
- NRHP reference No.: 76001660
- Added to NRHP: November 7, 1976

The Bergdoll Mansion is a historic house located in the Spring Garden neighborhood of Philadelphia. It was designed by architect James H. Windrim and built in 1886. It is in a Beaux Arts / Italianate style.

The mansion was added to the National Register of Historic Places in 1976.

== History and architecture ==
The building was constructed as the home of the Louis Bergdoll family, owners of the City Park Brewery. Grover Cleveland Bergdoll, scion of the well known brewing family, was a playboy, aviator, and World War I draft dodger. In 1920, Bergdoll was apprehended in the mansion by authorities searching for him due to his draft dodging.

The 14,000-square-foot (1,300 m^{2}) mansion has eight bedrooms, nine bathrooms, two kitchens, mahogany woodwork, multiple fireplaces, frescoes, and mosaics. It was listed for sale in 2012 with an asking price of $6.9 million.

The house was damaged by a fire in 1989.
