= John T. Windrim =

American architect

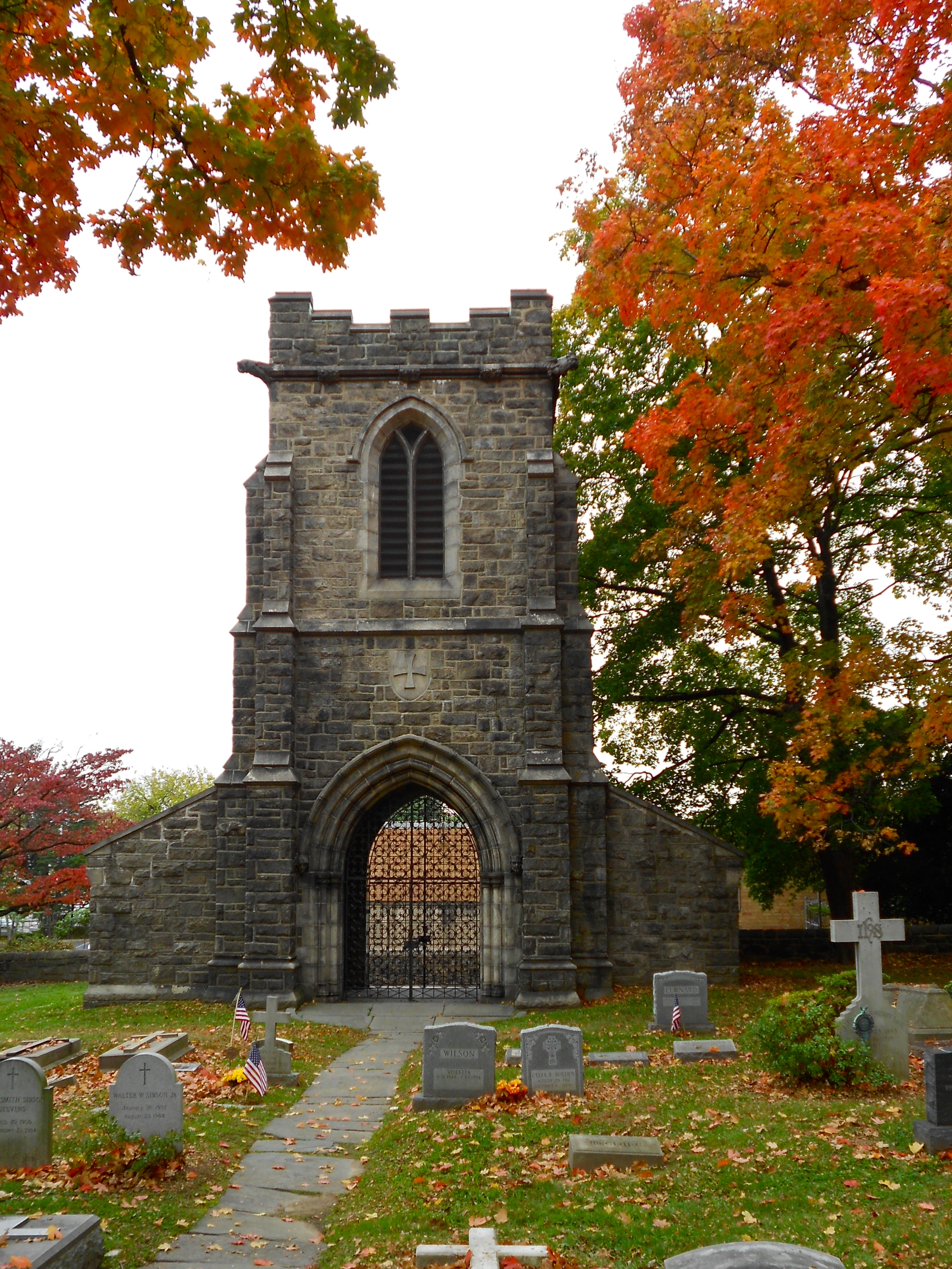
Wanamaker Memorial Bell Tower and Mausoleum (1908)

John Torrey Windrim (February 14, 1866 in Philadelphia, Pennsylvania – June 27, 1934 in Devon, Pennsylvania) was an American architect. His long time chief designer was W. R. Morton Keast.

He trained in the office of his father, architect James H. Windrim. Windrim was known for the classical revival style known as Beaux Arts. He was elected to the Philadelphia Chapter of the American Institute of Architects in 1901, and became a Fellow of the Institute in 1926. He practiced for over forty years.

He designed more than sixty buildings for the Bell Telephone Company and more than thirty for the Philadelphia Electric Company, including the massive Chester Waterside Station in Chester, Pennsylvania along the Delaware River.

For John Wanamaker, he designed the Wanamaker Branch of the Free Library of Philadelphia (1903), and "Lindenhurst" (1911), Wanamaker's mansion in Jenkintown, Pennsylvania. For son Rodman Wanamaker, he designed the Wanamaker Memorial Bell Tower and Mausoleum (1908) at the Church of St. James the Less. For the Wanamaker Store, he designed the Lincoln-Liberty Building (PNB Building) (1930–31).

Windrim was a member of the AIA, the Architectural League of New York, the Philadelphia Art Club, the American Institute of Banking and the Union League. He was the President of the Evening Telegraph Co. for two years and served as Director of the Provident Trust Co., the Philadelphia Electric Company and the Susquehanna Power Company.

Windrim's papers are at the Athenaeum of Philadelphia.

== Works ==
=== Philadelphia ===
- A group of dormitories at Girard College.
- Bank of North America.
- Sub-police station, Chestnut Hill (1892).
- 26th District Police and Patrol Station (1896).
- Moore Wireworks, 200 N 3rd St. (1900)
- The Commonwealth Trust Company Building, 1201-05 Chestnut St. (1901–06), with James H. Windrim.
- Oliver H. Bair Funeral Home (1907).
- Wanamaker Memorial Bell Tower and mausoleum (1908) at the Church of St. James the Less.
- The Thomas W. Evans Museum and Dental Institute at the University of Pennsylvania School of Dental Medicine (1911).
- Philadelphia Electric Company Delaware Generating Station (1917).
- Germantown Exchange, Bell Telephone Company (1921).
- Evergreen Exchange, Bell Telephone Company (1923).
- Grays Road Recreation Center (1926-1927).
- Oregon Jackson Exchange, Bell Telephone Company (1930).
- The Lincoln Liberty Building (PNB Building), 1 S. Broad St. (1930–31).
- The Research Institute at Lankenau Hospital.
- The Jefferson Medical College and Hospital and Thompson Annex.
- The Presbyterian Hospital.
- Family Court Building, 1801 Vine St. (1930–41).
- Wills Eye Hospital (now Colonnade Apartments), 1601 Spring Garden St. (1931–32).
- Franklin Institute (1934) and Benjamin Franklin National Memorial (1938).

=== Elsewhere ===
- Ryan Legislative Office Building, Harrisburg, Pennsylvania (1893)
- "Fairlawn", John T. Windrim Residence, Fairfield Avenue and Sugartown Road, Devon, Pennsylvania (completed 1902).
- Delaware County Electric Company, Chester Waterside Station, Chester, Pennsylvania (1916–19). Added to the National Register of Historic Places in 2007.
- "Inisfada", Nicholas F. Brady residence, Manhasset, Long Island, New York (1916–20).
- Delaware and Atlantic Telephone and Telegraph Company, Atlantic City, New Jersey (1924).
- State Correctional Institution at Rockview 1 Rockview Place, Bellefonte, Pennsylvania
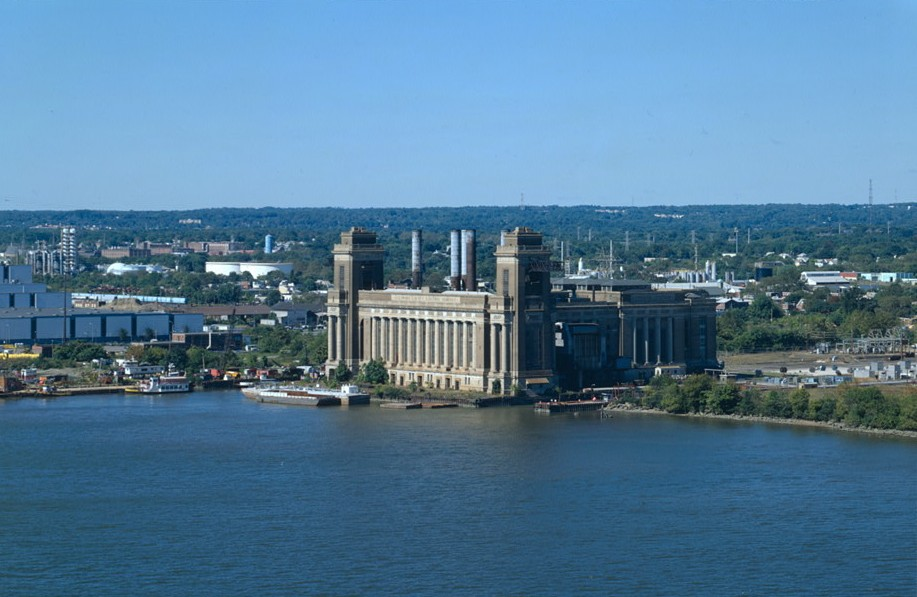
Delaware County Electric Company, Chester Waterside Station, Chester, Pennsylvania (1916–19).

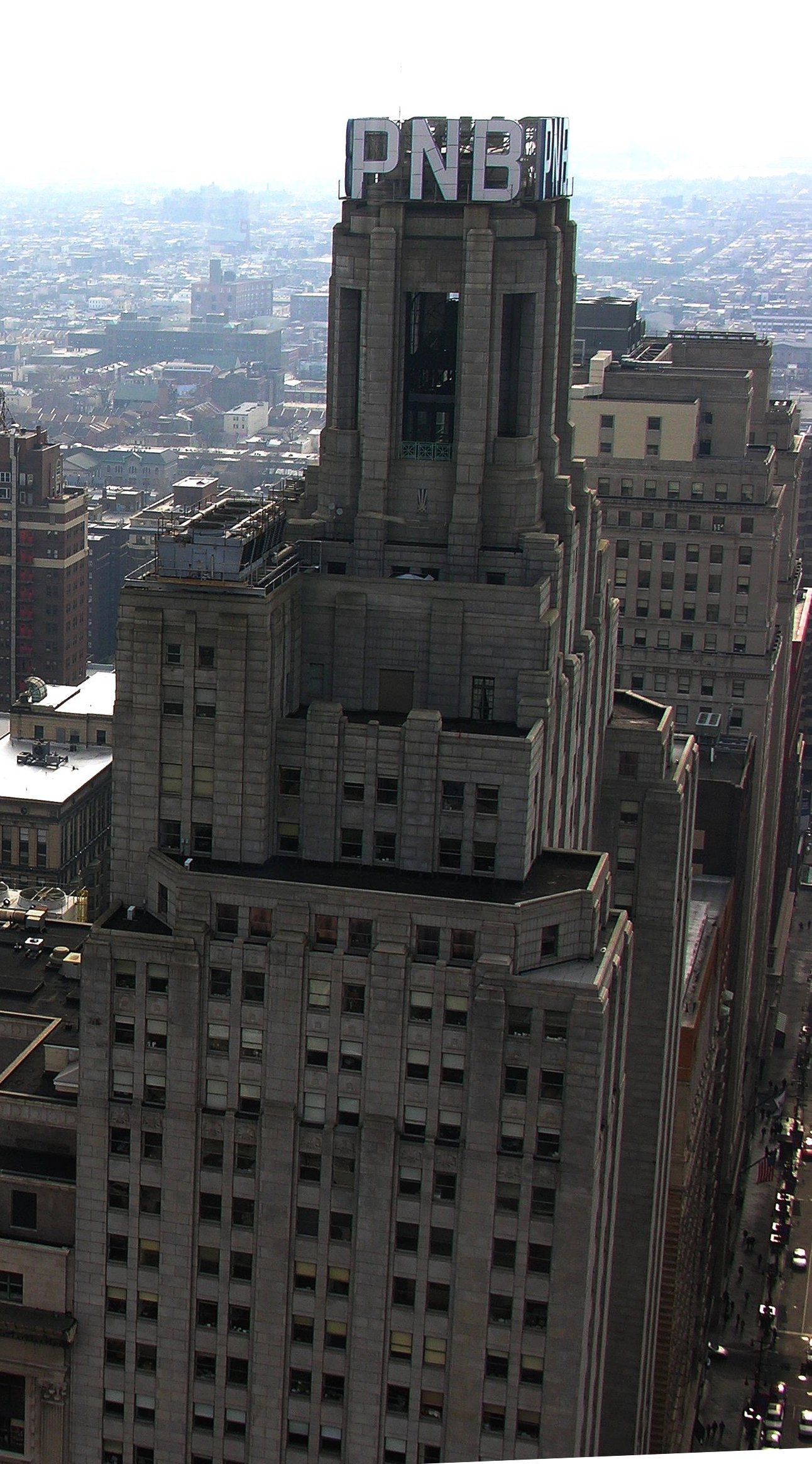
Lincoln-Liberty Building (PNB Building), Philadelphia (1930–31).

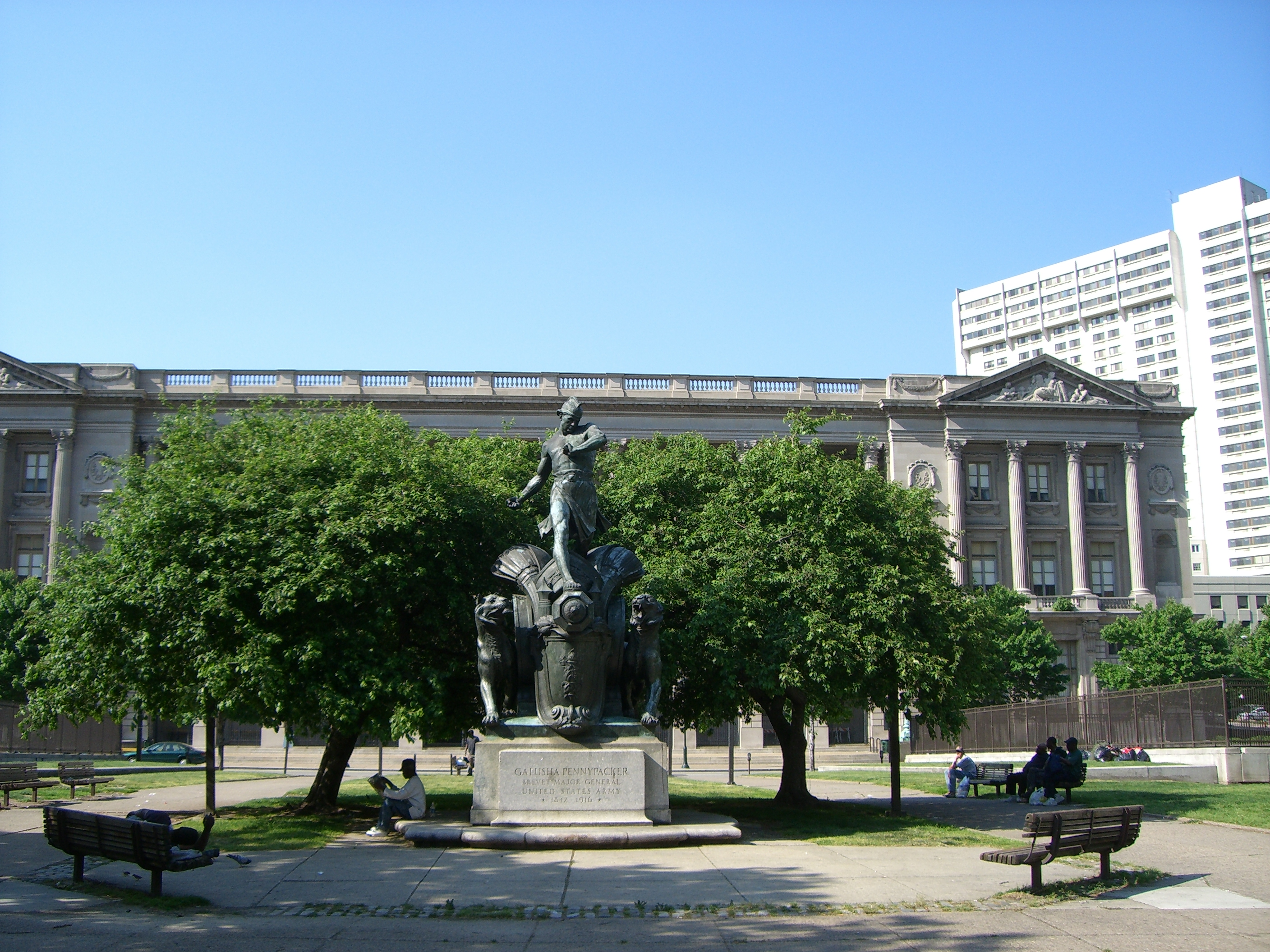
Pennypacker Statue in front of the Family Court Building, Logan Circle, Philadelphia (1930–41).

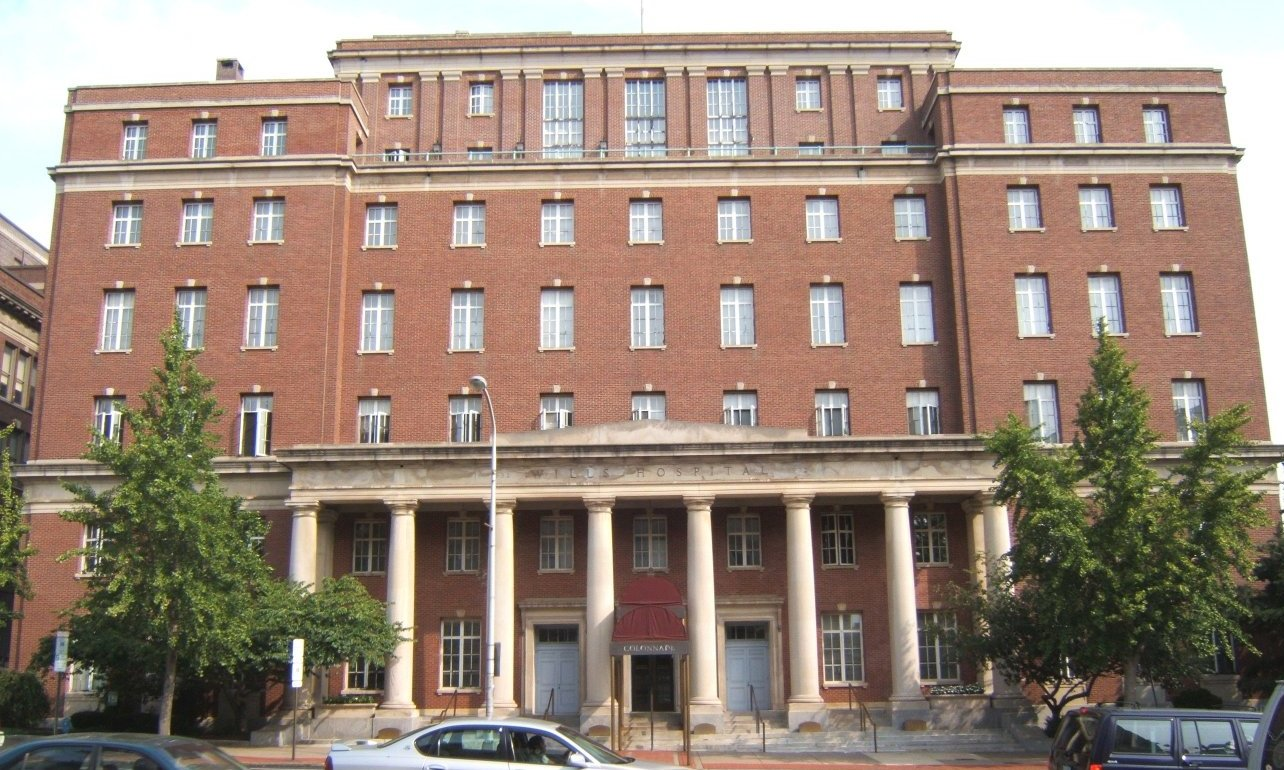
Wills Eye Hospital (now Colonnade Apartments), Philadelphia (1931–32).

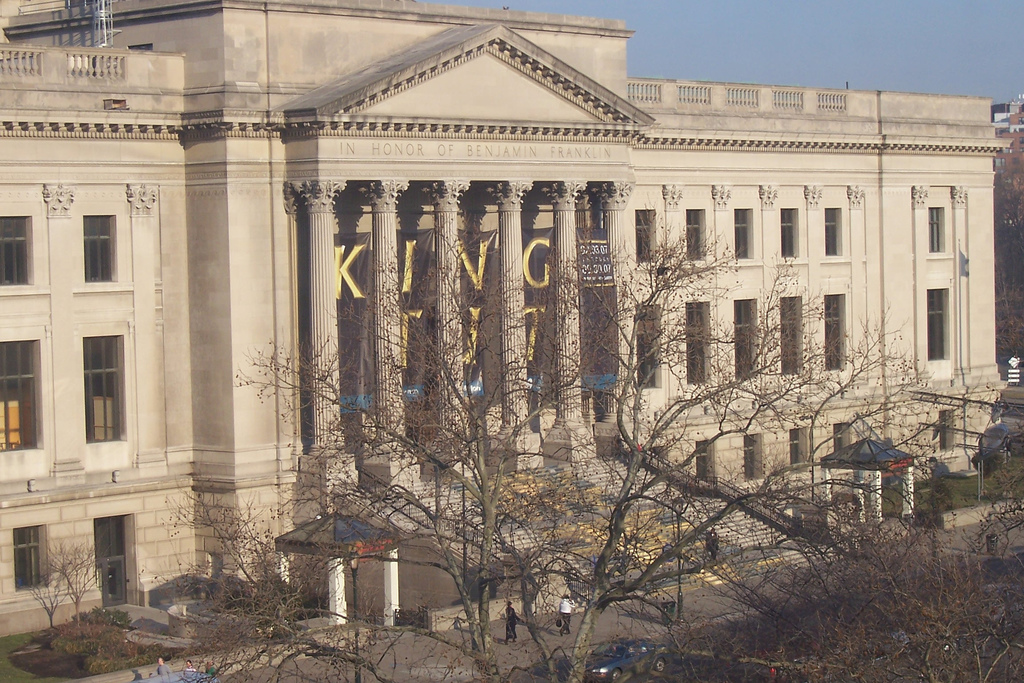
Franklin Institute, Philadelphia (1934)

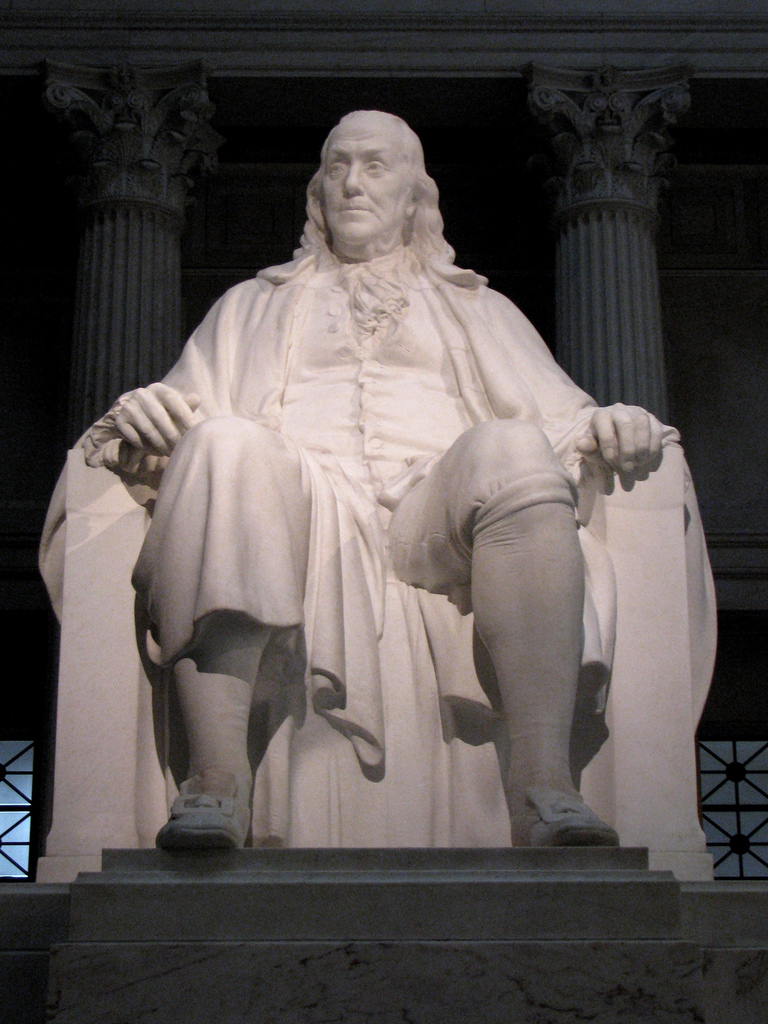
Benjamin Franklin National Memorial (1938), James Earle Fraser, sculptor.
