= Louis Bergdoll House =

Historic house in Pennsylvania, United States

- U.S. National Register of Historic Places
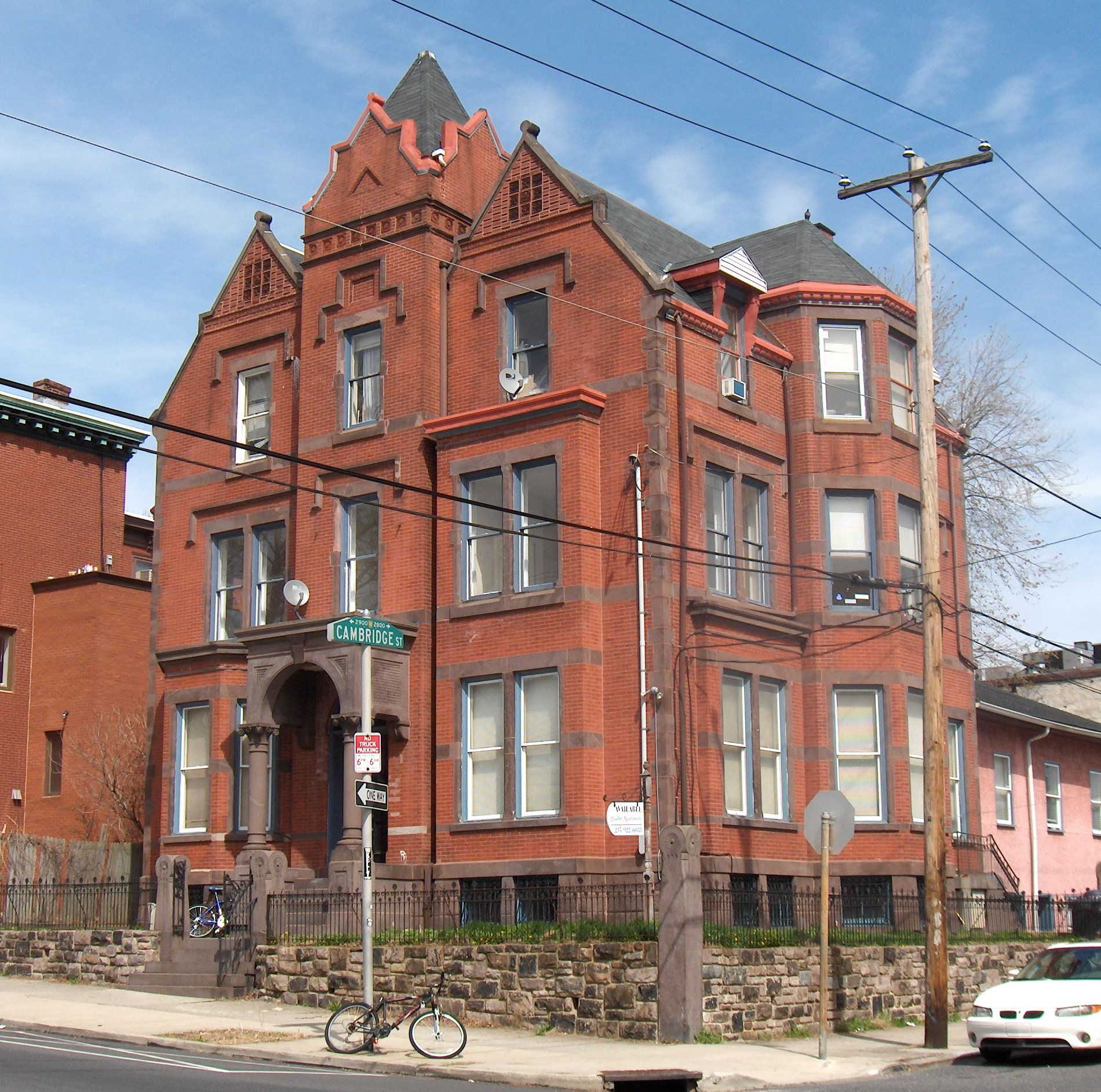
- Louis Bergdoll House, April 2009

- Location within Philadelphia Location within Pennsylvania Location within the United States
- Location: 929 N. 29th St., Philadelphia, Pennsylvania
- Coordinates: 39°58′26″N 75°11′2″W
- Area: less than one acre
- Built: 1885
- Architect: Otto C. Wolf
- Architectural style: Gothic Revival, Germanic Gothic
- NRHP reference No.: 85000038
- Added to NRHP: January 3, 1985

Louis Bergdoll House is a historic home located in the Brewerytown neighborhood of Philadelphia, Pennsylvania. It was built in 1885 and is in a Germanic Gothic-style.

It was added to the National Register of Historic Places in 1985.
