= Benjamin Franklin Bache =

American journalist, printer and publisher

- Born: August 12, 1769; Philadelphia, Province of Pennsylvania, British America
- Died: September 10, 1798 (aged 29); Philadelphia, Pennsylvania, U.S.
- Parent(s): Richard Bache; Sarah Franklin Bache
- Relatives: Benjamin Franklin (maternal grandfather)

Benjamin Franklin Bache (/ˈbiːtʃ/ BEECH; August 12, 1769 – September 10, 1798) was an American journalist, printer and publisher. He founded the Philadelphia Aurora, a newspaper that supported Jeffersonian philosophy. He frequently attacked the Federalist political leaders, including Presidents George Washington and John Adams, and historian Gordon S. Wood wrote that "no editor did more to politicize the press in the 1790s." His paper's heated attacks are thought to have contributed to passage of the Alien and Sedition Acts by the 5th United States Congress and signed into law by President John Adams in 1798.

The grandson of Benjamin Franklin, Bache was often referred to as "Lightning Rod Junior" after his famous grandfather's experiment. The son of Sarah Franklin and Richard Bache, he died at 29 in the yellow fever epidemic of 1798.

== Early life ==
Sarah "Sally" Franklin, the only daughter of Benjamin Franklin and Deborah Read, met Richard Bache while on a visit away from her parents. They were married on November 2, 1767. On August 12, 1769, she gave birth to their son, Benjamin Franklin Bache.

From the moment she set eyes on her grandson, Deborah Read Franklin fell in love with Benjamin, whom she called “her little kingbird.” She took to “Benny,” as she called him, as her very own. She and her husband had lost their only son, Francis Folger Franklin, at the age of four from smallpox. She and Benjamin had earlier taken in his illegitimate son, William Franklin, as an infant at the beginning of their marriage, and raised him in their household.

Benjamin Franklin Bache was baptized on August 30, 1769, in Christ Church in Philadelphia. His godmothers were his paternal aunt and Deborah Read Franklin. His godfathers were his uncle and grandfather Benjamin Franklin, who had a proxy at the ceremony, as he was on an extended diplomatic mission in England.

On December 19, 1774, Deborah Read died. Although he was at her funeral, the boy Benjamin regretted not having been at his grandmother's deathbed. In May 1775, at the age of five, Bache met his grandfather Benjamin Franklin for the first time when he returned from England. His grandfather's arrival brought more tumult to his home, as Franklin had brought with him William Temple Franklin, his 15-year-old grandson, who was the illegitimate son of William Franklin.

On October 29, 1776, Franklin took his two grandsons along on his diplomatic mission to France to negotiate a firm alliance. Bache was seven when their party boarded the USS Reprisal, and sailed for France. They suffered violent storms, and attacks by hostile British ships. Soon after arriving in France, Benjamin Franklin enrolled Bache in a local boarding school run by Mr. d’Hourville. Without any English-speaking students attending the school, Franklin later transferred him to Le Coeur's along with other students from the British North American colonies, such as Charles Cochran, Jesse Deane, and John Quincy Adams, son of John Adams of Massachusetts. In the spring of 1779, Benjamin Franklin sent Bache to Geneva, as he wanted Bache to gain experience in a Republic. Although he was not a stellar student, he won a school prize for translating Latin into French. Perhaps affected by being taken from his family at such a young age, as well as his grandfather's lengthy absences due to his diplomatic work, Bache appeared depressed and shy as an adolescent. By June 1783, Benjamin Franklin was ready to recall his grandson to Paris, where Bache would apprentice as a printer until the two returned to Philadelphia in 1785. There he entered the University of the State of Pennsylvania (today's University of Pennsylvania), founded by his grandfather as the College of Philadelphia. His Geneva preparation in Greek and Latin (the core of the college's three-year curriculum) enabled him to graduate in two years, earning his degree in 1787.

== Marriage and children ==
Bache met Margaret Hartman Markoe in 1788. In November 1791, they married and she moved into 322 High (later renamed Market) Street. In 1792, they moved to 112 High Street in Philadelphia. They had their fourth child in September 1798. Benny contracted yellow fever about the same time. Before he died, Bache hired William Duane to help run the business with Margaret.

== Printing career ==
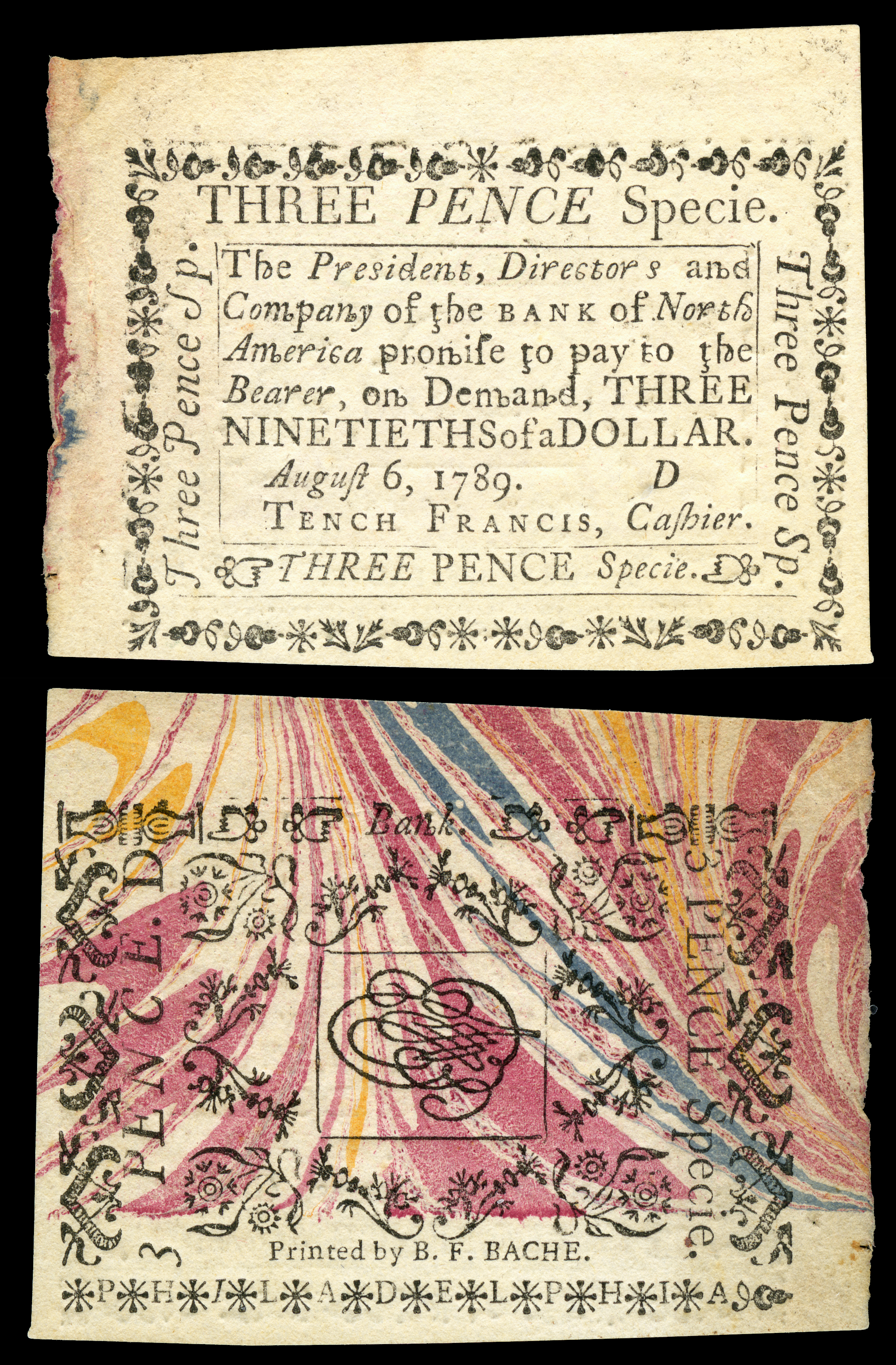
Three pence Bank of North America note printed (1789) by Bache on specialized marbled paper obtained by Benjamin Franklin

After a few years at Le Coeur's, Franklin began having Bache trained for a career as a printer-publisher, as he had been. In the early months at Geneva, the youth was under the care of Philibert Cramer. At the age of 13, he was also learning the classics: he was already interpreting Telemachus, Terence, Sallust, Cicero's Catiline Orations, Lucian, and the New Testament in Greek. In 1781, Bache wrote in his diary about the extensive school work which demanded much of his time.

Upon returning to Philadelphia, Bache began working as a printer at his grandfather's shop at the family's Franklin Court property on Market Street, presaging his future career as a newspaper editor. Bache had learned type-founding as an apprentice in Paris to Francois-Ambrose Didot, the first printer to print on vellum paper. He considered Didot to be the “best printer that now exists and maybe that has ever existed.” After living abroad for so long, he felt that Philadelphia seemed foreign.

As his grandfather was starting to fade, Bache oversaw the print shop's operations, but under the older man's watchful eye. His first print job was "An Ode in Imitation of Alcaeus," a poem by the linguistic scholar William Jones, who decried England's corruption and the misuse of monarchical power. Bache's first ventures in commercial publishing were school texts, including Isaiah Thomas’ collection of writings by Aesop and Erasmus.

His early ventures also included reprinting a series of four Lessons for Children books by Anna Letitia Barbauld, an Englishwoman. She used a Lockean approach of applying behavioral techniques of esteem and disgrace to instill wisdom and virtue. Her works taught children not to cry, mistreat animals, or be idle. In one story, three boys at a boarding school receive cakes from home. Harry greedily eats his cake and becomes sick. Peter hoards his cake until it becomes stale. Billy shares his cake with the other students and eventually with an old blind man. The act of being unselfish made the boy “more glad than if he had eaten ten cakes.”

== Newspaper career ==
Following his grandfather's death in 1790, Bache inherited Franklin's printing equipment and many of his books. He founded The Philadelphia Aurora, a newspaper with an editorial position that surpassed Franklin's fierce pro-French and democratic position. Bache promised, "This paper will always be open, for the discussion of political, or any other interesting subjects, to such as deliver their sentiments with temper and decency, and whose motives appears to be, the public good." He also said, "The strictest impartiality will be observed in the publication of pieces offered with this view."

When he started on October 1, 1790, he called the paper the General Advertiser, and Political, Commercial, Agricultural and Literary Journal. In contrast to other papers, his incorporated articles on the sciences, literature, and the useful arts. Like Bache, many republican opponents criticized the Federalist policies and practices for ignoring the premises of enlightenment egalitarianism. After three months, on January 1, 1791, Bache dropped the word “Agricultural” from his paper's title and removed the motto – “Truth, Decency, Utility” – from the nameplate. He enlarged the size of the paper's pages. Bache told his readers that he could not offer the variety of material originally intended as long as a “more important matter” was at hand. Later that year, Bache also dropped the words “Political, Commercial and Liberty Journal” from the nameplate. Increasingly polemical, the paper promoted political reforms in line with republican ideals.

Bache continued to denounce the Federalists and attacked both the current President, John Adams, and George Washington. He provoked outrage by suggesting that Washington had secretly collaborated with the British during the American Revolution. Bache was arrested and indicted for sedition while the Senate was considering the passage of the Alien and Sedition Acts in 1798, legislation supported by President Adams. The law may have been written to suppress opponents such as Bache. The persistent theme of Republican journalism of the 1790s was that the federal government had fallen into the hands of an aristocratic party aligned with Britain, and that the Federalists (particularly Washington and Alexander Hamilton) were hostile to the interests of the general public while promoting corporate interests. Bache thought the problem was less the form of governance than the beliefs and behavior of those who governed. He objected to the US Senate's holding its meetings behind closed doors, as he thought that showed contempt for the public. Bache believed discussion about the Jay Treaty, for instance, should have been open to the public.

In November 1794, Bache said that he was renaming his paper to The Aurora and General Advertiser; it was to “diffuse light within the sphere of its influence, dispel the shades of ignorance, and gloom of error and thus tend to strengthen the fair fabric of freedom on its surest foundation, publicity and information.” The name, “Aurora” represented the ascent and accessibility of information promised to its readers. Bache adopted the motto "Surgo Ut Prosim" (I rise to be useful), to honor his grandfather. For Bache, the motto symbolized the dawning, not the setting of the sun on the new republic.

=== Decline ===
The Aurora was regularly filled with articles attacking what Bache considered to be Washington's monarchical tendencies, his hostile actions toward France, contempt for the public, and his friendly relations with Britain. After anti-Federalists accused Washington of being too ready to accept public adulation, Bache increased his attacks. The publisher appeared to lose impartiality as he increasingly favored Jefferson and became more hostile to Adams. Bache had not been equally critical of Washington's presidency. Washington had been a frequent visitor at the Franklin family's home. While still a general, Washington enjoyed a close relationship with Bache's grandfather.

Bache's attacks on the administrations of Washington and Adams provoked equal hostility from their supporters. Bache suffered financially for his position, as Jeffersonians turned elsewhere. At one point, he could not pay a five-dollar fine, and increasingly was unable to pay his own employees in a timely manner. Many Federalists withdrew business from him. While he acquired several hundred new subscribers in 1798, he encountered problems in collecting payment. The newspaper's viability declined.

Increasingly, Bache was attacked by other journalists in print. William Cobbett, known by his pen name Peter Porcupine, described him as a "stubborn sans culotte" and proposed that he be treated "as we would a TURK, a JEW, a JACOBIN or a DOG". Even Federalists were taken aback, and his friends became concerned for his safety.

=== Downfall ===
In April 1797, while Bache was investigating the construction of the ship USS United States, Clement Humphreys, the son of Joshua Humphreys, the ship's architect, physically assaulted him. Bache escaped, but heard remarks from the crowd that he deserved the beating. He had printed an accusation that the ship's carpenters were taking bribes. In May 1798, Bache's residence and office were threatened by a mob. They smashed the glass door leading to his office, but refrained from vandalizing his home. His family was terrified.

Soon after, Bache criticized John Fenno in print. His son John Ward Fenno confronted Bache, demanding that he publicly apologize to his father; when the publisher refused, Fenno assaulted him. Bache fought back and generally refused to be intimidated by such threats.

While the Federalist-dominated Congress passed the Sedition Act of 1798 to suppress criticism such as Bache's, Bache was arrested in June 1798 for common-law seditious libel even before the law was passed. He quickly posted bail and continued to publish his paper, condemning the Act in print as a violation of the First Amendment.

=== Death and legacy ===
Before being tried, Bache died on September 8, 1798, at the age of 29 from yellow fever during an epidemic; while Philadelphia's worst yellow fever epidemic was in 1793, the disease regularly visited the city. Bache was buried in the Christ Church Burial Ground in Philadelphia. He is regarded as an early champion of freedom of speech and the First Amendment.

His widow, Margaret, relied on the paper's editor William Duane (whom she married in 1800) to continue publication of the Aurora. Duane, who with United Irish émigrés had led protests against the Alien and Sedition Acts, inherited the hostility of Cobbett and Feno. They accused him of advancing principles of interracial democracy in a conspiracy with the French to divide and dismember the United States. The Aurora ceased publication in 1824.

== See also ==
- Hartman Bache, son
- Richard Bache Jr., brother
- A Syllabical and Steganographical table, printed in 1797

== Bibliography ==
- "Bache, Benjamin Franklin (journalist)". The Biographical Dictionary of America. Vol. 1. 1906. p. 173.
- Rosenfeld, Richard N. American Aurora (New York: St. Martin's Press, 1997).
- Tagg, James Douglas. "Benjamin Franklin Bache and the Philadelphia 'Aurora' " (PhD dissertation, Wayne State University; ProQuest Dissertations Publishing, 1973. 7411168).
