= Margaret Hartman Markoe Bache =

American printer and editor

Margaret Hartman Markoe (Markøe) Bache (Note: She is also known as Margaret Bache, Margaret Duane, and Margaret Hartman Markoe Bache Duane) (/ˈbiːtʃ/ BEECH; November 7, 1770 – May 28, 1836) was an American printer and editor. Born in Saint Croix, then part of the Danish West Indies, she was raised in Philadelphia. Bache ran the Aurora newspaper with her first and second husbands, Benjamin Franklin Bache and William Duane. It survived attempts at its demise through the period leading up to the American Revolutionary War and became a leading newspaper in the United States, covering local, national and international news.

== Personal life ==
Born November 7, 1770 in Saint Croix, Margaret Hartman Markoe (Markøe in Danish) was the daughter of Elizabeth Hartman and Francis Markoe. Her parents had emigrated from Denmark to St. Croix, where they had a sugar plantation, Clifton Hill estate. After her father's death, likely in the late 1770s, she and her mother emigrated to Philadelphia. They lived in a large mansion of her uncle Abraham Markoe, who was a successful merchant. Shortly after they moved to Philadelphia, Elizabeth married Adam Kuhn, a physician. Elizabeth died in 1790.

Bache met Benjamin Franklin "Benny" Bache, an "eager suitor" in 1788. In November 1791, they married and she moved into 322 Market Street. In 1792, they moved to 112 High Street in Philadelphia. They had their fourth child, Hartman Bache, in September 1798. Benny contracted yellow fever about the same time and died on September 8, 1798.

Bache and fellow journalist William Duane, hired by Benny before his death, were married at the Christ Church in Philadelphia on June 28, 1800. They lived at 316 Market Street some time after their union. After 25 years of marriage, Bache told Thomas Jefferson in 1824 that she had the qualities of "a Roman matron".

== Printer and publisher ==
Bache worked with her husband operating the Aurora newspaper and his printing business. In the events leading up to the American Revolution, Benny's life became more dangerous as he delved into political controversies, like the Jay Treaty. Benny campaigned against the treaty across New England, during which Dr. Michael Leib, a family friend, ran their business. Considered among the Jeffersonian "radicals", they experienced slandering from the federalist press, and shunned by some, including family members. William Cobbett's newspaper, Porcupine's Gazette was particularly defamatory.

Following Benny's death in 1798, Bache became owner and operator of the newspaper and printing business. William Duane, who was hired to help run the business, was hired by Benny prior to his death. Although challenged by competitors, threatened strikes by the paper's pressmen and compositors, and attempts to buy off the Aurora, it grew in coverage and in size. It was expanded to include more national and international news and became the "leading newspaper in the United States.

== See also ==
- List of women printers and publishers before 1800
