= Philadelphia Aurora =

- Type: Daily newspaper
- Founder: Benjamin Franklin Bache
- Editor: William Duane (1798–1822)
- Founded: October 1, 1790 (as General Advertiser, and Political, Commercial, Agricultural and Literary Journal)
- Ceased publication: 1824
- Political alignment: Radical republicanism
- Language: English
- City: Philadelphia, Pennsylvania (1794–1800); Washington, D.C. (1800–1802); Philadelphia, Pennsylvania (1802–1824)
- Country: United States
- OCLC number: 88155826

The Philadelphia Aurora, originally the Aurora General Advertiser, was a newspaper, published six days a week in Philadelphia from 1794 to 1824. The paper was founded by Benjamin Franklin Bache, and was continued as a tri-weekly, after his death from yellow fever in September 1798, as a leading organ of radical republicanism by the Irish-American journalist William Duane.

== History ==
=== 18th century ===
The paper was started on October 1, 1790, as the General Advertiser, and Political, Commercial, Agricultural and Literary Journal by Bache. His grandfather, Benjamin Franklin, had died earlier that year and Bache had inherited all his printing equipment and many of his books. By 1791, the name had been contracted to General Advertiser. In 1794, it was renamed the Aurora and General Advertiser.

Bache died while awaiting trial on charges of seditious libel against President John Adams and his Federalist administration which disapproved of Bache's editorial support of the French position in the XYZ Affair. His widow, Margaret Hartman Markoe Bache, relied on the paper's editor, William Duane, to continue publication. They were later to marry.

The Federalists, decried by Duane as "ardent eulogists of privileged orders . . . [and] of a British form of government", triumphed with the succession of John Adams as president in 1797, but did not succeed in their efforts to close down the paper. In February 1799, juries rejected attempts to prosecute Duane for sedition following an incident, reported by the Federalists as a "United Irish riot", in which he had been accosted while posting petitions against the Alien and Sedition Acts. Duane was again charged, for seditious libel, in response to articles published in the Aurora intimating that Great Britain had used intrigue to exert its influence on the United States. But able to produce a letter that John Adams himself had written a few years earlier implying the same in respect of the appointment of Thomas Pinckney as the United States' minister to London, Duane avoided prosecution. In May 1799, Duane was severely beaten in his home by army officers demanding to know the source for an article detailing abuses in the repression of Fries’ Rebellion in eastern Pennsylvania.

=== 19th century ===
In 1800, the Aurora played a singular role in defeating efforts in the Federalist-controlled Congress to, in effect, steal the presidency from Adams's challenger, Thomas Jefferson. It published details of the Ross Bill which would have established a closed-door Grand Committee, chaired by the Chief Justice of the Supreme Court, an Adams appointee, with powers to disqualify College electors. Facing charges of breaching Senate privileges and of contempt, Duane went into hiding for several weeks until the Federalist-controlled Congress adjourned. Jefferson called the Aurora "our comfort in the gloomiest days", and John Adams named Duane as one of the three or four men most responsible for his defeat.

In anticipation of Jefferson's victory, Duane had moved the paper to Washington, D.C., the new federal capital, in 1800, and renamed it Aurora, for the Country. The paper did win new prominence (for a period appearing as an earlyday Congressional Record), but Duane did not receive the patronage in printing he had expected from the new administration. After two years, he returned with the paper to Philadelphia.

Back in Pennsylvania, the Aurora promoted judicial and constitutional reforms intended to hold state judges and state senators to greater popular account. As a result, in the gubernatorial election of 1805 it help split the Jeffersonian coalition in the state: previously defeated Federalists ("Quids") coalesced with "Constitutional Republicans" to secure the re-election of Thomas McKean, a lawyer who had rejected the Aurora's program. When his successor from 1808, Simon Snyder, whom the Aurora had supported, also failed to deliver on reform, a bitter, long lasting feud, ensued, This included a print war with Duane's former associate in the London Corresponding Society, John Binns, a trusted advisor to Snyder and, from 1807, editor in Philadelphia of the Democratic Press. The conflict did much to discredit radical republicanism and to embolden nativist protests against "foreign extremists". The influence and readership of the Aurora declined. In 1822, Duane "dropped his editorial pen", and in 1824 the paper ceased publication.
