= Bengal Journal =

18th century newspaper in Kolkata

- Owner(s): William Duane and Thomas Jones
- Founded: 1785
- Language: English language
- Headquarters: Calcutta, British India

Bengal Journal was a newspaper founded in 1785 by William Duane and Thomas Jones.

The Bengal Journal alarmed the East India Company authorities with its reporting of revolutionary events in France and caused outrage when it published an erroneous report of Lord Cornwallis having been killed during a campaign against Tipu Sultan. Duane blamed a source he identified as an agent of the French Royalist French Government in Exile. Duane was sued for libel against the exile government, and the Governor-General of Bengal John Shore, 1st Baron Teignmouth, shut down the paper. Duane was subsequently dragged by his hair through the streets of Calcutta to a debtors' prison. In 1794, after managing a second newspaper, The Indian World, which reported on radical disaffection in the junior ranks of EIC army, Shore had Duane deported back to England. The Bengal Journal gives us information about the life in the 19th century CE.
