= Alien and Sedition Acts =

Set of 1798 laws in the United States

- Long title: Naturalization Act of 1798; Alien Friends Act; Alien Enemies Act; Sedition Act of 1798
- Enacted by: the 5th United States Congress
- Effective: June–July 1798

Citations
- Statutes at Large: 1 Stat. 566, 1 Stat. 570, 1 Stat. 577, 1 Stat. 596

Codification
- Acts repealed: Naturalization Act of 1798 repealed in 1802; Alien Friends Act and Sedition Act expired.

Legislative history
- Passed the Senate on; Passed the House of Representatives on; Signed into law by President John Adams on June 18, 1798 (Naturalization Act); June 25, 1798 (Alien Friends Act); July 6, 1798 (Alien Enemies Act); July 14, 1798 (Sedition Act)

Major amendments
- Amended in 1918 (Alien Enemies Act)

The Alien and Sedition Acts of 1798 were four U.S. statutes that restricted naturalization, empowered the president of the United States to detain and deport foreigners, and criminalized false or malicious statements against the federal government. The laws were endorsed by the Federalist Party, led by President John Adams, on national security grounds in response to the later stages of the French Revolution and ongoing disputes with the French revolutionary government which had culminated in naval skirmishes. The prosecution of American journalists under the Sedition Act rallied public support for the opposition, led by Thomas Jefferson, who defeated Adams in the presidential election of 1800.

Under the Jefferson administration, three of the four Acts were repealed. Only the Alien Enemies Act, (Note: An "alien" in this sense, is a person who is not a national of the United States.) granting the president powers of detention and deportation of foreigners in wartime or in face of a threatened invasion, remained in force. It was invoked by United States presidents during the War of 1812, World War I, and World War II. During both World Wars, it provided the legal authority for the internment of German Americans. During World War II, it also provided the legal authority for the internment of Japanese Americans and the internment of Italian Americans, which was authorized by an executive order on purely racial grounds. In March 2025, President Donald Trump invoked the Alien Enemies Act as his authority for expediting deportation of foreigners; this invocation is subject to ongoing litigation.

== Summary ==
Act	Purpose	Status
Naturalization Act of 1798	To increase the requirements to seek citizenship.	Repealed in 1802.
Alien Friends Act of 1798	To allow the president to imprison and deport foreigners.	Expired in 1800.
Alien Enemies Act of 1798	To give the president additional powers to detain foreigners during times of war, invasion, or predatory incursion.	Amended in 1918 to have gender-neutral applicability, currently codified at sections 4067 through 4070 of the Revised Statutes (50 U.S.C. 21 et seq.).
Sedition Act of 1798	To criminalize false and/or malicious statements about the federal government.	Expired in 1800.

== History ==
After the American Revolutionary War concluded, France was unable to provide further loans; Congress could no longer pay its soldiers. In 1793, Congress unilaterally suspended repayment of French loans from the war, and in 1794 signed the Jay Treaty with Great Britain. France, engaged in the 1792 to 1797 War of the First Coalition, retaliated by having French privateers seize U.S. ships on both the Eastern Seaboard and the Caribbean.

President John Adams sent envoys to Paris but was purportedly confronted with a demand by French foreign minister Talleyrand for a bribe as a condition for opening formal negotiations. The publication in the Philadelphia Aurora of Talleyrand's account of what became known as the XYZ Affair initiated the first attempted prosecution under the Sedition Act. Charged with seditious libel against Adams and his Federalist administration, the Aurora's publisher Benjamin Franklin Bache died in advance of his trial.

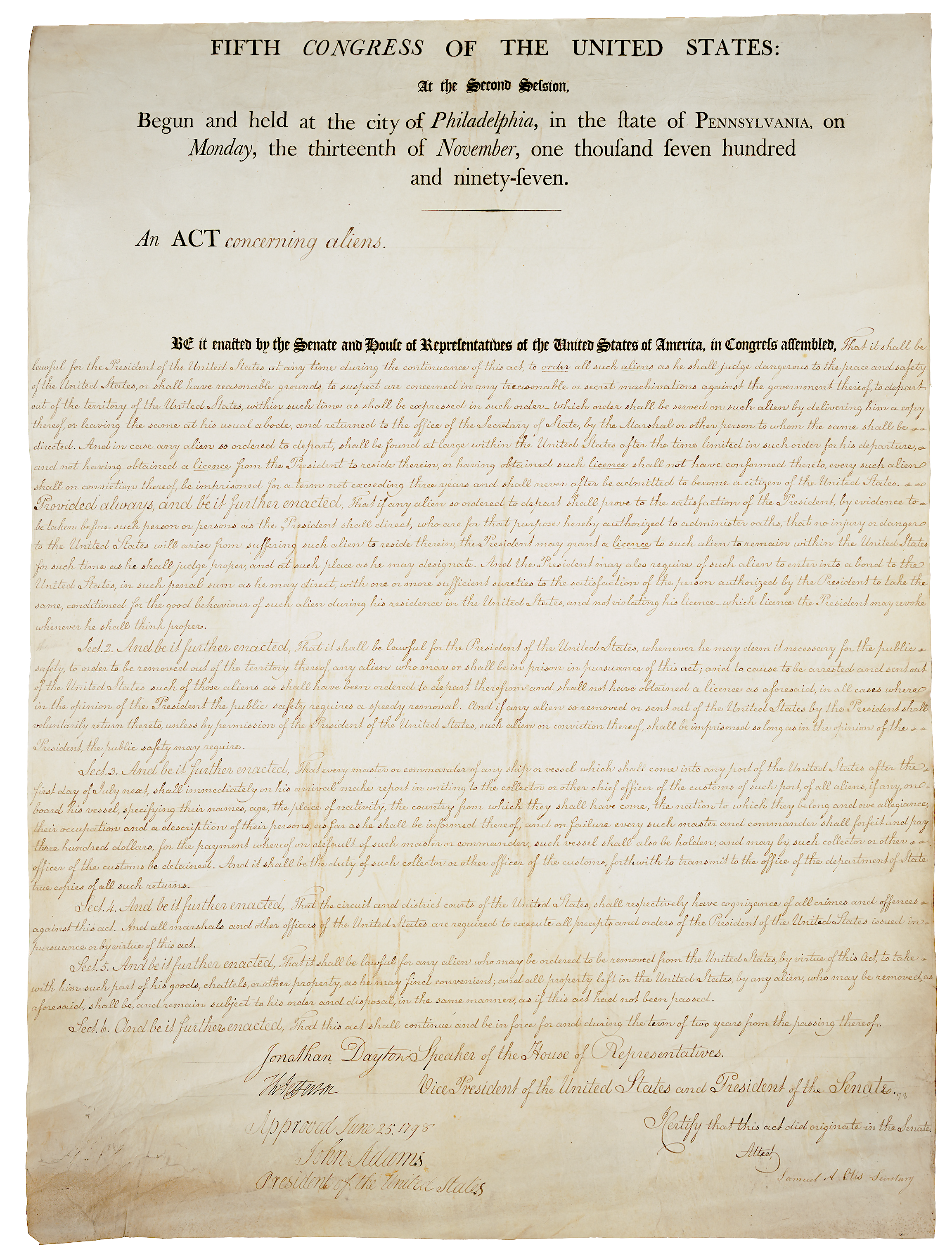
Alien Friends Act of 1798

The unresolved dispute with France evolved into the Quasi-War (1798 to 1800) fought almost entirely at sea, primarily in the Caribbean and off the East Coast of the United States. Believing that French military successes in Europe had been assisted by the broader appeal of French revolutionary ideals, the Adams administration proposed the Alien and Sedition acts as counter to what they presumed would be a French strategy of domestic subversion.

Protests occurred across the country, with critics denouncing the Acts as an encroachment of the federal executive upon the powers of Congress and the judiciary, and a violation of the First Amendment right to free speech, primarily intended to suppress the Democratic-Republican opposition As campaign material for his 1800 United States presidential bid, Vice President Thomas Jefferson secretly authored a Kentucky resolution, seconded by James Madison in the Virginia legislature, asserting the right of the states to nullify the Acts as unconstitutional. (States north of Virginia passed counter-resolutions asserting that the courts alone had the right of interpretation). Unless repealed, Jefferson suggested the legislation might drive states "into revolution and blood".

Alarmed, the Federalists accused the Democratic-Republicans of shielding the subversive activities of French and French-sympathizing immigrants. The Federalist pamphleteer William Cobbett accused Bache's successor at the Aurora, William Duane, of orchestrating a conspiracy among United Irish émigrés. Convening in Philadelphia's African Free School, and admitting, together with "all those who have suffered in the cause of freedom", free blacks, the Irish republicans had formed a society dedicated to the proposition (to which each member attested) that "a free form of government, and uncontrouled [sic] opinion on all subjects, [are] the common rights of all the human species". Against the backdrop of the Quasi War and of the Haitian Revolution (then still under the flag of the French Republic), for Cobbett, this was sufficient proof of an intention to organise slave revolts and "thus involve the whole country in rebellion and bloodshed". In protesting the Acts, Duane had argued, in letter to George Washington, for an entirely civic concept of American citizenship, one that might encompass "the Jew, the savage, the Mahometan, the idolator, upon all of whom the sun shines equally".

With President John Adams naming Duane as one of the three or four men most responsible for his defeat, Jefferson's Democratic-Republicans ticket triumphed in the elections of 1800. Upon assuming the presidency, Jefferson pardoned those still serving sentences under the Sedition Act, and the new Congress repaid their fines.

== Alien Friends Act ==
Alien Friends Act
- Long title: An Act concerning Aliens
- Enacted by: the 5th United States Congress

Citations
- Public law: Pub. L. 5–58
- Statutes at Large: 1 Stat. 570

Legislative history
- Signed into law by President John Adams on June 25, 1798

The Alien Friends Act (officially "An Act Concerning Aliens") authorized the president to deport any foreigner determined to be "dangerous to the peace and safety of the United States." Once a foreigner was determined to be dangerous or was suspected of conspiring against the government, the president had the power to set a reasonable amount of time for departure, and remaining after the time limit could result to up to three years in prison. The law was never directly enforced, but it was often used in conjunction with the Sedition Act to suppress criticism of the Adams administration. Upon enactment, the Alien Friends Act was authorized for two years, and sunsetted thereafter. Democratic-Republicans opposed the law, with Thomas Jefferson referring to it as "a most detestable thing... worthy of the 8th or 9th century."

While the law was not directly enforced, it resulted in the voluntary departure of foreigners who feared that they would be charged under the act. The Adams administration encouraged these departures, and Secretary of State Timothy Pickering ensured that the ships were granted passage. Though Adams did not delegate the final decision-making power, Secretary Pickering was responsible for overseeing enforcement of the Alien Friends Act. Both Adams and Pickering considered the law too weak to be effective; Pickering expressed his desire for the law to require sureties and authorize detainment prior to deportation.

Many French nationals were considered for deportation but were allowed to leave willingly, or Adams declined to take action against them. These figures included philosopher Constantin François de Chassebœuf, comte de Volney, General Victor Collot, scholar Médéric Louis Élie Moreau de Saint-Méry, and diplomat Victor Marie du Pont. Secretary Pickering also proposed applying the act against the French diplomatic delegation to the United States, but Adams refused to do so. Journalist John Daly Burk agreed to leave under the act informally to avoid being tried for sedition, but he went into hiding in Virginia until the act's expiration. Adams never signed a deportation order.

== Alien Enemies Act ==
Alien Enemies Act
- Long title: An Act respecting Alien Enemies
- Acronyms (colloquial): AEA
- Enacted by: the 5th United States Congress

Citations
- Public law: Pub. L. 5–65
- Statutes at Large: 1 Stat. 577

Codification
- U.S.C. sections created: 50 U.S.C. ch. 3

Legislative history
- Signed into law by President John Adams on July 6, 1798

The Alien Enemies Act (officially "An Act Respecting Alien Enemies") was passed to supplement the Alien Friends Act, granting the government additional powers to regulate the activity of foreigners in times of war or invasion. Under this law, the president could authorize the arrest, relocation, or deportation of any male over the age of 14 who hailed from a foreign enemy country. It also provided some legal protections for those subject to the law. Unlike the other acts, this act was largely unopposed by the Democratic-Republicans.

The Alien Enemies Act did not contain a sunset clause and has sustained force and effect, codified as sections 4067 to 4070 of the Revised Statutes (50 U.S.C. 21–24).

=== Invocations of the Alien Enemies Act ===
Following the resolution of the Quasi War in 1800, and up until the second administration of President Trump in 2025, the Alien Enemies Act was invoked by the United States executive on three occasions.

==== War of 1812 ====
President James Madison invoked the act against British nationals during the War of 1812, and ordered them to report to local authorities in order to undertake additional duties.

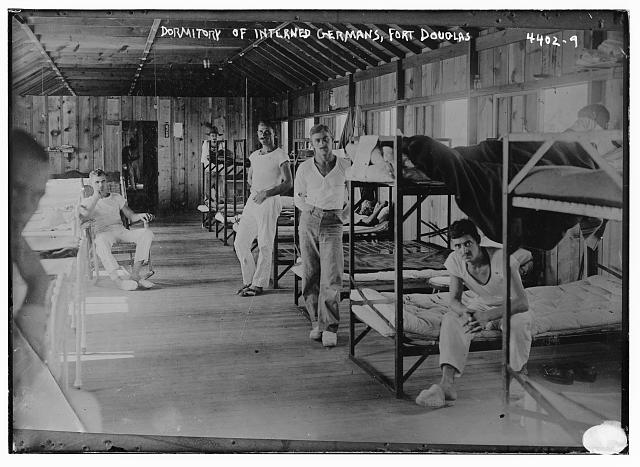
German-American internees at Fort Douglas during World War I

==== World War I ====
President Woodrow Wilson invoked the act against nationals of the Central Powers during World War I. In 1918, an amendment to the act struck the provision restricting the law to males.

==== World War II ====
On December 7, 1941, in response to the attack on Pearl Harbor, President Franklin D. Roosevelt used the authority of the revised Alien Enemies Act to make presidential proclamations #2525 (Alien Enemies – Japanese), #2526 (Alien Enemies – German), and #2527 (Alien Enemies – Italian), in order to apprehend, restrain, secure, and remove Japanese, German, and Italian foreigners. However, most of the 120,000 persons of Japanese descent incarcerated in U.S. internment camps were U.S. citizens detained solely on the basis of their Japanese ancestry, under the authority of Executive Order 9066 issued by Roosevelt early in 1942. The order was issued on the basis of wartime and national defense statutes unrelated to the Alien Enemies Act, and while deployed primarily against Japanese Americans did lead to the detention of smaller numbers of U.S. citizens of German and Italian descent.

Hostilities with Germany and Italy ended in May 1945, and President Harry S. Truman issued presidential proclamation #2655 on July 14. The proclamation gave the attorney general authority regarding enemy aliens within the continental United States, to decide whether they are "dangerous to the public peace and safety of the United States," to order them removed, and to create regulations governing their removal, citing the Alien Enemies Act. On September 8, 1945, Truman issued presidential proclamation #2662, which authorized the secretary of state to remove enemy aliens that had been sent to the United States from Latin American countries. On April 10, 1946, Truman's proclamation #2685 modified previous proclamations, and set a 30-day deadline for removal.

In Ludecke v. Watkins (1948), the Supreme Court interpreted the time of release under the Alien Enemies Act. German alien Kurt G. W. Lüdecke was detained on December 8, 1941, under Proclamation 2526, and continued to be held after cessation of hostilities. In 1947, Lüdecke petitioned for a writ of habeas corpus to order his release, after the attorney general ordered him deported. The court ruled 5–4 to affirm the district court and appellate decisions to deny the writ of habeas corpus. The Court also concluded that the Alien Enemies Act allowed for detainment beyond the time hostilities ceased until an actual treaty was signed with the hostile nation or government or the until the president determines that hostilities have concluded.

President Ronald Reagan signed the Civil Liberties Act of 1988, which conceded that the internment of Japanese Americans had been based on "race prejudice, war hysteria, and a failure of political leadership", and authorizing compensation for survivors.

==== 2025 peacetime invocation against Venezuelans ====
Donald Trump at his second inauguration, "by invoking the alien enemies Act of 1798 I will direct our government to use the full and immense power of federal and state law enforcement to eliminate the presence of all foreign gangs and criminal networks bringing devastating crime to US soil including our cities and inner cities"

On September 20, 2024, amid increased numbers of Venezuelan asylum seekers seeking refuge in the United States, then-nominee Donald Trump announced that if elected president for a second term he would invoke the Alien Enemies Act to expedite the removal of foreigners and criminal networks operating in the United States. On October 27, 2024, he again mentioned the Alien Enemies Act during a campaign rally held at Madison Square Garden, claiming that he would use it to remove undocumented migrants operating within gangs and criminal networks on "day one" of his presidency.

Proclamation 10903
- Invocation of the Alien Enemies Act Regarding the Invasion of the United States by Tren de Aragua
- Type: Presidential proclamation
- President: Donald Trump
- Signed: March 14, 2025; 19 months ago

Federal Register details
- Federal Register document number: 2025-04865
- Publication date: March 20, 2025
- Document citation: 90 FR 13033

Trump repeated his intentions in his second inaugural address on January 20, 2025, and on March 14, he signed Presidential Proclamation 10903 invoking the Alien Enemies Act against what he termed an invasion being perpetrated or attempted by the Venezuelan criminal gang Tren de Aragua.

Attorney General Pam Bondi signed "Guidance For Implementing the Alien Enemies Act", dated 14 March 2025, which directs immigration enforcement to obtain a document from an executive branch immigration officer, without a warrant from a judicial branch judge and authorized that "where circumstances render it impracticable", immigration enforcement has the authority to enter a residence without any document. The memo also said "The alien is not entitled to a hearing, appeal, or judicial review".

The day after signing the proclamation, the administration conducted the March 2025 Venezuelan deportations to the Terrorism Confinement Center (CECOT) in El Salvador. Trump's executive order was temporarily blocked the same day by District of Columbia District Court Judge James Boasberg, following a lawsuit, J.G.G. v. Trump, seeking to stop the deportations.

On April 7, 2025, the U.S. Supreme Court vacated Judge Boasberg's temporary restraining order and held that the plaintiffs must bring the lawsuit in Texas, where they were being held, not in Washington, D.C. The court also ruled that the government must provide sufficient notice to the plaintiffs and an opportunity to challenge the deportation. The ruling did not address the constitutionality of the deportation.

On April 19, 2025, in a signal that the majority of justices did not trust that the Trump administration was complying with the April 7 ruling, the Supreme Court issued an emergency late-night order in A.A.R.P. v. Trump, halting the deportation process in the Northern District of Texas. According to court filings, the government intended to fly the Venezuelan detainees out of the country within 24 hours.

== Naturalization Act ==
The Naturalization Act increased the residency requirement for American citizenship from five to 14 years and increased the notice time from three to five years. Although the law was passed under the guise of protecting national security, most historians have concluded that it was really intended to decrease the number of citizens and thus voters who disagreed with the Federalist Party. At the time, a majority of immigrants supported Thomas Jefferson and the opposition Democratic-Republican Party. The act was repealed by the Naturalization Act of 1802.

== Sedition Act ==
Sedition Act
- Long title: An Act in addition to the act, entitled "An act for the punishment of certain crimes against the United States"
- Enacted by: the 5th United States Congress

Citations
- Public law: Pub. L. 5–74
- Statutes at Large: 1 Stat. 596

Legislative history
- Signed into law by President John Adams on July 14, 1798

The Sedition Act was the most controversial of the four laws and passed narrowly by a vote of 44–41 in the House of Representatives after several amendments, including a sunset provision which caused the law to expire in March 1801, which was the start of the next presidential term.

The legislation made it illegal to print "false, scandalous and malicious writing or writings against the government of the United States, or either house of the Congress of the United States, or the President of the United States." It was signed into law by Adams on July 14, 1798.

The act was used to suppress speech critical of the Adams administration, including the prosecution and conviction of many newspaper owners and printers who supported vice president Thomas Jefferson and disagreed with the Federalist Party. The Sedition Act did not extend enforcement to speech about the vice president. It was allowed to expire in 1800, and historians have credited its enactment and enforcement with helping Jefferson win the presidential election that year.

=== Invocations of the Sedition Act ===
At least four publishers, one protestor, one member of Congress, and one drunken bystander were prosecuted under the Sedition Act from 1798 to 1801.

Benjamin Franklin Bache, editor of the Philadelphia Aurora and grandson of Benjamin Franklin, was the first to be arrested under the Sedition Act. In 1798, he was charged with libelling Adams ("the blind, bald, crippled, toothless, querulous Adams") whom he had accused of nepotism and monarchical ambition and against whom he had supported the French position in the XYZ affair. He was released on bail but died of yellow fever before trial.

The first person to be put to trial for violating the acts, after publishing criticism of Adams, was Matthew Lyon, an Irish immigrant, Revolutionary War veteran and a Democratic-Republican congressman from Vermont. His offenses were an editorial that accused the Adams administration of "ridiculous pomp, foolish adulation, and selfish avarice," and the publication of poems by the American diplomat and supporter of the French Revolution, Joel Barlow. While awaiting trial, Lyon further enraged Federalist opinion by commencing publication of Lyon's Republican Magazine, subtitled "The Scourge of Aristocracy." At trial, in October 1798, he was fined $1,000 (equivalent to $19,000 in 2025) and sentenced to four months in jail. With the distinction of being the first Congressman to be elected while in jail, on his release, he returned to the House of Representatives.

Anthony Haswell, an English immigrant and a printer of the Vermont Gazette, reprinted Bache's claim that the federal government employed Loyalists and published an advertisement to raise money to pay Lyon's fine which decried Lyon's jailers for exercising "usurped powers". Haswell was found guilty of seditious libel by judge William Paterson and sentenced to a $200 fine (equivalent to $3,800 in 2025) and a two-month imprisonment.

In 1799, William Duane, Bache's successor at the Aurora, faced charges under the Sedition Act for his purported instigation of the St. Mary's Church riot in Philadelphia, and for an editorial that intimated that Great Britain had used intrigue to exert its influence with the Adams administration. In both charges, the prosecution case collapsed.

In November 1798, David Brown led a group in Dedham, Massachusetts, including Benjamin Fairbanks, in setting up a liberty pole with the words, "No Stamp Act, No Sedition Act, No Alien Bills, No Land Tax, downfall to the Tyrants of America; peace and retirement to the President; Long Live the Vice President." Brown was arrested in Andover, Massachusetts, but because he could not afford the $4,000 bail (equivalent to $75,900 in 2025), he was taken to Salem for trial. Brown was tried in June 1799 and pleaded guilty but refused to provide the names of those who had assisted him. Justice Samuel Chase sentenced him a $480 fine (equivalent to $9,100 in 2025) and eighteen months in prison, the most severe sentence imposed under the Sedition Act.

James T. Callender was a Scottish pamphleteer who had fled Great Britain after publishing The Political Progress of Britain, a critique of war, imperialism, and corruption. After moving from Ireland to Philadelphia to Virginia, he wrote for the Richmond Examiner and published The Prospect Before Us after its personal review and approval by Jefferson. In the book Callender called the Adams administration a "continual tempest of malignant passions" and referred to Adams as a "repulsive pedant, a gross hypocrite, and an unprincipled oppressor." Callender was indicted in 1800, convicted and sentenced to a $200 fine (equivalent to $3,800 in 2025) and nine months in jail.

Luther Baldwin was indicted, convicted, and fined $100 (equivalent to $1,900 in 2025) for a drunken incident during a visit by Adams to Newark, New Jersey. Upon hearing a gun report during a parade, he yelled "I hope it hit Adams in the [backside]."

== See also ==
- Alien Act 1705 in Great Britain
- First Party System in the United States, 1794–1824
- Seditious Meetings Act 1795 in Great Britain
- History of laws concerning immigration and naturalization in the United States
- Logan Act of 1799
- Espionage Act of 1917
- Sedition Act of 1918
- Alien Registration Act of 1940
- Immigration and Nationality Act of 1952
- Homeland Security Act of 2002
- Asylum in the United States
- Deportation in the second presidency of Donald Trump

== Bibliography ==
- Martin, Susan F. (2010). A Nation of Immigrants. Cambridge University Press. doi:10.1017/CBO9780511777943. ISBN 978-0511777943. S2CID 7071386.
