= Syllabical and Steganographical Table =

Eighteenth-century work believed to be the first cryptography chart

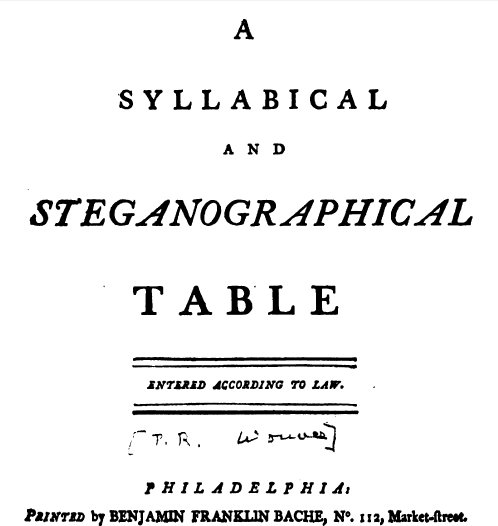
English version cover page, 1797

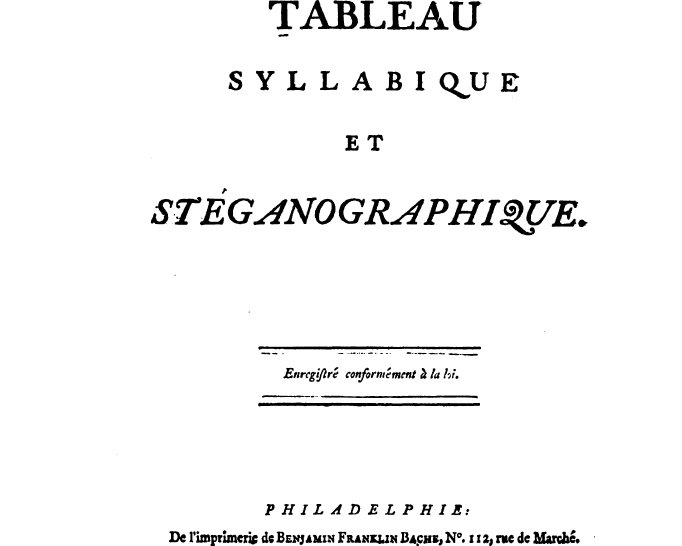
French version cover page, 1797

Syllabical and Steganographical Table (French: Tableau syllabique et stéganographique) is an eighteenth-century cryptographical work by P. R. Wouves. Published by Benjamin Franklin Bache in 1797, it provided a method for representing pairs of letters by numbers. It may have been the first chart for cryptographic purposes to have been printed in the United States.
