= William Duane (journalist) =

American journalist, publisher, author and activist

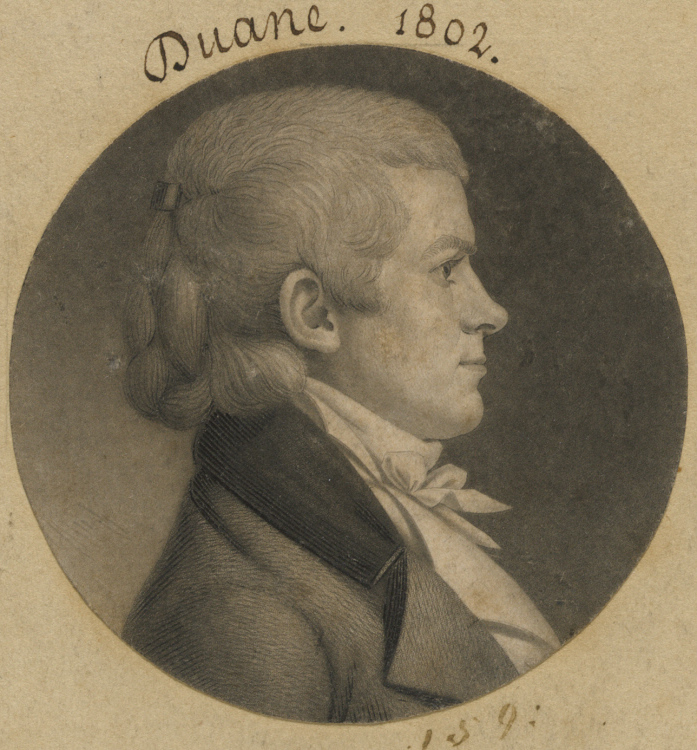
- Born: 12 May 1760; St John's, Newfoundland
- Died: 24 November 1835 (aged 75); Philadelphia, Pennsylvania, U.S.
- Resting place: Laurel Hill Cemetery, Philadelphia, Pennsylvania, U.S.
- Occupations: Journalist, editor, publisher. Calcutta: The India Gazette, Bengal Journal, The Indian World. London: The Telegraph. Philadelphia: Aurora.
- Political party: Democratic-Republican
- Movement: London Corresponding Society, American Society of United Irishmen, American codification movement.

William Duane (12 May 1760 – 24 November 1835) was an Irish-American journalist, publisher, author and political campaigner who was active on four continents.

After working for radical Whig newspapers in Ireland and in London, Duane managed two titles of his own in the Bengal Presidency of the British East India Company. Both were closed down for seditious content and in 1794 he was deported by order of the Governor General. Back in London, he edited The Telegraph as a leading member of the city's federation of democratic clubs, the London Corresponding Society. In advance of the society's suppression, in 1796 he returned to North America which he had first left as a child.

As editor of the Philadelphia Aurora, Duane became a leading publicist for Thomas Jefferson's Democratic-Republican opposition as well as for a community United Irish émigrés with whom he protested the Alien and Sedition Acts. In response, the Federalist press accused Duane of advancing principles of interracial democracy in a conspiracy with the French to divide the American Union. Duane, however, failed to maintain an abolitionist stance when, in the War of 1812, British forces pursued a policy of recruiting fugitive American slaves.

Finding limited favour with the Jefferson administration in Washington, Duane split the Democratic-Republican coalition in Pennsylvania by pressing reforms to hold the state judiciary and state legislature to greater popular account. In his later years, he joined war hero Andrew Jackson and the Democratic Party in their opposition to concentrating control of public credit in a central bank. He also travelled in and reported from, South America where he was recognised by his hosts for his support in their wars of independence.

== Early life ==
Duane was born in St. John's, Newfoundland to a Catholic Irish couple, Anastasia (née Sarsfield) and John Duane (Ó Dubháin). Shortly afterward the family moved south to Lake Champlain, New York where in 1765, his father, a farmer and surveyor, died: killed, according to later family lore, in an attack by Indians. After some years in Philadelphia and Baltimore, his mother brought him to Ireland, accepting the protection of his paternal family in Clonmel. In 1779, his mother, who had intended him for the priesthood, disowned him when he married Catherine Corcoran, a Protestant. He found employment, apprenticing as a printer with a local paper, the Hibernian Advertiser, that supported the Volunteer movement for reform, and celebrated the American struggle for independence.

== Bengal Journal and The Indian World ==
Sometime in the early 1780s, Duane began working as a journalist in London. As a parliamentary reporter and political commentator for the General Advertiser, he gained a reputation as a Real or Radical Whig. This, not least, was for his coverage of the parliamentary impeachment of Warren Hastings, the first Governor General of India. In 1788, after sending his wife and infant son back to Clonmel, Duane was induced to travel himself to India. The promised position in Calcutta as editor of The India Gazette did not materialise, but while working as a revenue collector for the East India Company (enjoying the friendship of his superior, Thomas Law, a reformer who was to oppose war with the French Republic), in December 1789 he began to edit and manage the Bengal Journal.

The East India Company authorities were alarmed by his reporting of news from revolutionary France, and of intrigues in the various Indian princely courts where a return of French influence was greatly feared. He further offended by printing a spurious report of Lord Cornwallis having been killed while on the campaign against Tipu Sultan. Duane blamed a source he identified as an agent of the French Royalist Government in Exile. Sued for libel, Duane lost control of his paper and, dragged by his hair through the streets of Calcutta, was committed to a debtors' prison. Undaunted, he founded a second newspaper, The Indian World. In 1794, this gave the Company further offence by revealing radical disaffection in the junior ranks of its army. Invited to breakfast by the Governor-General, Lord Teignmouth, he was seized on the way by Sepoys, held in the dungeon (the "Black Hole") of Fort William, and placed a ship bound for England.

Possibly adding to the suspicion with which he was regarded by authorities, Duane sought to promote printing in the different languages of the sub-continent. He had for that purpose designed a number of different typeface scripts.

== The Telegraph and the London Corresponding Society ==
Back in London, Duane secured editorship of The Telegraph a paper (reportedly benefitting from news transmission via the optical telegraph) owned by members of the London Corresponding Society (LCS). These were radical reformers committed to universal manhood suffrage and to annual parliaments. In addition to campaigning against the East India Company, Duane took a steady line against the war with the new French Republic which government supporters sought to discredit by feeding the paper spurious reports of French victories.

Through the period 1795-96, Duane took an active role in the LCS, and may have followed a number of prominent Irish members—Colonel Edward Despard (who had returned from the West Indies equally disillusioned by Britain's colonial mission), the brothers Benjamin and John Binns, Arthur O'Connor, and William Henry Hamilton—in taking the Test or pledge of the United Irishmen.

Before the government of William Pitt, charging collusion with the United Irishmen and with the French, proscribed the Society, with John Binns, Duane chaired the last, and grandest, of its mass meetings. Riding a tide of street protest, the LCS called a "monster meeting" for 26 October 1795 at Copenhagen Fields, Islington. Speaking alongside veteran reformers Joseph Priestley, Charles James Fox, and John Thelwall, crowds estimated at upwards of 200,000 heard Duane confirm his Painite commitment to natural rights and democratic liberties. Three days later, George III, in procession to the state Opening of Parliament, had the windows of his carriage smashed by crowd shouting "No King, No Pitt, No war". The government seized on the occasion to introduce the Seditious Meetings Act and the Treason Act. Together with the encouragement given to magistrates to use their public order powers, the Two Acts effectively muzzled the Society's activities.

In the new year, and in advance of widespread arrests, Duane departed for the United States from which, in his disputes with the East India Company, he had already claimed citizenship.

== Philadelphia Aurora and the American United Irishmen ==
In Philadelphia, then the provisional capital of the United States, Benjamin Franklin Bache (who had learned the printing trade in the company of his grandfather, Benjamin Franklin, in Paris) hired Duane to work on his Aurora newspaper. This was the leading journal of Thomas Jefferson's Democratic Republican opposition. As a result of his attempt to justify the French position in the XYZ Affair, Bache faced charges of seditious libel against President John Adams and his Federalist administration. When, awaiting trial, Bache in died in September 1798 (carried away by the same yellow fever outbreak that had taken Duane's wife in July), his widow, Margaret Hartman Markoe Bache, relied on Duane to continue publication. They were later to marry.

Bache had been serially denounced by the English immigrant and pamphleteer William Cobbett. The "stubborn sans culotte" should, Cobbett suggested, be treated "as we would a TURK, a JEW, a JACOBIN or a DOG". He was to direct the same invective against Duane's growing circle of United Irish émigrés, describing them as men "animated by the same infamous principles, and actuated by that same thirst for blood and plunder, which had reduced France to a vast human slaughter-house". In May 1798, he began publishing accounts of a Conspiracy, Formed by the United Irishmen, With the Evident Intention of Aiding the Tyrants of France In Subverting the Government of the United States. Convening in Philadelphia's African Free School, and admitting, together with "all those who have suffered in the cause of freedom" (including free blacks), the Irish republicans had formed a society dedicated to the proposition (to which each member attested) that "a free form of government, and uncontrouled [sic] opinion on all subjects, [are] the common rights of all the human species". Against the backdrop of America's Quasi-War with French and of the Haitian Revolution (then still under the flag of the French Republic), for Cobbett, this was sufficient proof of an intention to organise slave revolts and "thus involve the whole country in rebellion and bloodshed".

The American Society of United Irishmen had been formed in 1797. By the beginning of 1799, it had chapters in Philadelphia, Baltimore, New York and Wilmington: ports of entry that had begun to receive defeated insurgents from the summer rebellion in Ireland. In December 1798, in an editorial reprinted by Cobbett, the leading Federalist paper, the Gazette of the United States, identified Duane as one of the society's principals, alongside his Market Street neighbor, the publisher Matthew Carey, and, James Reynolds. A United Irish veteran from County Tyrone, Reynolds had co-authored with Duane The Plea of Erin, a memorial presented to Congress protesting the Alien and Sedition Acts.

Duane declared that in the cause of Ireland's emancipation from "the horrid yoke of Britain" he was as "very a United Irishman as any tyrant could abhor". But in protesting the Alien and Sedition Acts, he had also articulated the Painite universalism that Cobbett proposed was at the heart of the alleged Franco-Irish conspiracy. In a reply to George Washington's Farewell Address, Duane had argued for citizenship that, in the "spirit of resistance to oppression, the spirit of philanthropy, the spirit of benevolence, of humanity", could encompass "the Jew, the savage, the Mahometan, the idolator, upon all of whom the sun shines equally".

== Jeffersonian Democrat ==
=== At war with the Federalists ===
Those Duane decried as "Anglo-Federals"—"ardent eulogists of privileged orders . . . [and] of a British form of government"—triumphed with the succession of John Adams as President, but they never succeeded in jailing or silencing him. In February 1799, juries rejected attempts to prosecute Duane and Reynolds for sedition following an incident, reported by the Federalists as a "United Irish riot". They had been accosted while posting petitions against the Alien and Sedition Acts. He was again charged, for seditious libel in response to articles published in the Aurora intimating that Great Britain had used intrigue to exert its influence on the United States. But able to produce a letter that John Adams himself had written a few years earlier implying the same in respect of the appointment of Thomas Pinckney as the United States' minister to London, Duane avoided prosecution. In May 1799, Duane was severely beaten in his home by army officers demanding to know the source for an article detailing abuses in the repression of Fries's Rebellion in western Pennsylvania.

Within a week of the assault, Duane began organising a defence militia, eventually a series of companies some 800 strong called the Philadelphia Militia Legion. Drawn largely from the city's Irish, it was better known as the Republican Greens. In addition to protecting Duane and his presses from further attack, ultra-Republicans saw the drilled and armed volunteers as a counter to the perceived threat of a Federalist standing army. Duane argued that the volunteers were a Republican bulwark against the threat of Federalist tyranny.

Duane had played a singular role in defeating efforts in the Federalist-controlled Congress to, in effect, steal the presidency. In the Aurora, he published details of the Ross Bill which would have established a closed-door Grand Committee, chaired by the Chief Justice of the Supreme Court, an Adams appointee, with powers to disqualify College electors. Facing charges of breaching Senate privileges and of contempt, Duane went into hiding for several weeks until the Federalist-controlled Congress adjourned. Jefferson called the Aurora "our comfort in the gloomiest days", and John Adams named Duane as one of the three or four men most responsible for his defeat.

=== Seeking favour in Washington ===
On taking office in 1801, Jefferson wrote to Duane asking for "an exact list of the prosecutions of a public nature" against him, and over which he, as President, might have control. Any resting on the Sedition Act he would regard as an infringement on the First Amendment freedom of the press and, if necessary, would override the recommendation of the U.S. Senate to order a Nolle prosequi. Yet, unwilling to privilege Duane's paper over the rest of the Republican press, the President declined to help raise new funding for what Duane was now calling Aurora, for the Country. The paper did win new prominence (for a period appearing as an early-day Congressional Record), but Duane did not receive the printing contracts he had expected from the new administration. He was also disappointed in losing to the rivalry of Albert Gallatin control of Jefferson's patronage in Pennsylvania.

Duane, nonetheless, demonstrated his loyalty. Stung by the President's seeming ingratitude, James Callender, who had been fined and imprisoned under the Sedition Act for his scurrilous attacks on Adams, attempted, in effect, to blackmail Jefferson. In advance of his revelations, Duane sought to discredit the Scottish journalist. On 25 August 1802, the Aurora accused Callender of infecting his wife with venereal disease and of getting drunk in the next room while she languished and died and his children went hungry. In the next issue of his Richmond Recorder, under the heading "The President Again," Callender wrote that it was "well known that the man, whom it delighteth the people to honor, keeps, and for many years past has kept, as his concubine, one of his own slaves. Her name is SALLY." This was an exposé of Jefferson's long-term relationship with Sally Hemings (the "African Venus said to officiate as housekeeper at Monticello") and of their several children.

After two years in the new capital (in whose construction his former East India Company superior in Calcutta, Thomas Law, was making a fortune), Duane entrusted his operation in Washington to his son (by his first marriage), William J. Duane, and returned to Philadelphia.

== Slavery and the War of 1812 ==
Before leaving office in 1808, Jefferson appointed Duane a Lieutenant Colonel of Rifles. In 1811, now a private citizen, Jefferson did solicit funds for his benefit, while pleading with Duane to cherish and maintain Republican unity. In the War of 1812, his successor, James Madison, elevated Duane to adjutant general with the rank of colonel. Duane wrote and published his own military manuals: The American military library, or, Compendium of the modern tactics (1809); A Handbook for Riflemen (1812) and A Handbook for Infantry (1813), which ran into several editions.

During the war, Duane wrote a letter to Jefferson on 11 August 1814, expressing alarm at Britain's policy of recruiting fugitive American slaves into the British military. In the letter, he argued that Britain was finding in American slavery the division that it is "the policy of the British in every part of the globe" to exploit. Just as they have "arrayed the white Protestant against the white Catholic in Ireland", "the blacks of St. Domingo against the Whites" and "Mahomedans against Hindus in India", by offering American slaves liberty the British were seeking to set the anti-slavery North against the proslavery South and black Americans against white Americans. But more than this, Duane assured Jefferson that he concurred with him in regarding slavery as "congenial to the habits of thinking and to the condition of the actual Africans and their immediate descendants". While he may have "known Africans of highly cultivated minds", he did not regard them as true equals as there was not one but "content to be an external imitator of the manners and habits of white men".

Duane proposed to Jefferson that slaves be enrolled in the army, but was not clear that military service should earn them their freedom (as 4,000 to 5,000 were to do volunteering with the British). What is clear, is Duane believed that Jefferson could be swayed by the prospect of black soldiers saving "so many of the whites".

Although prominent United Irish exiles, such as Thomas Addis Emmet and William Sampson in New York, continued as uncompromising abolitionists, many of their compatriots were to follow Duane in conforming to racist, pro-slavery sentiment.

== Radical Democrat ==
Duane joined Sampson, "the Patriarch" of the American Codification movement, in launching a crusade for judicial reform from which President Jefferson stood notably aloof. Duane charged that a combination of judicial independence and English common law ("dark, arbitrary, unwritten, incoherent . . . and contradictory") allowed judges "not simply to administer the law, but [to] exercise a legislative and even an executive power directly in defiance and contempt of the Constitution". While in the British system, it was appropriate that they be independent of the monarch, in a free republic it was intolerable that judges should not be held to popular account. He published and promoted Sampson against the Philistines, or, The reformation of lawsuits (1805), attributed to Jesse Higgins, an Irish lawyer, in which the alternative of a general codified law of reference is presented as "justice made cheap, speedy, and brought home to every man's door".

When Pennsylvania governor Thomas McKean, whom the Aurora had previously supported, failed to respond to these arguments, Duane, in an Irish-German alliance with Congressman Michael Lieb, swung his support behind a Democratic-Republican challenger for governor, State House Speaker, Simon Snyder. The result was an election in 1805 that split the Jeffersonian coalition: previously defeated Federalists ("Quids") coalesced with "Constitutional Republicans" to secure the governor's re-election.

Snyder did succeed McKean at the end of 1808. But while as Speaker he had moved legislation to submit minor cases to arbitration, no other part of Duane's reform programme secured his support as governor. Neglected were his calls for the simplification of legal proceedings so that people might handle their own cases; the furnishing of lawyers, where required, by the government; term-limits for judges; simple, rather than two-thirds, majorities for their senate impeachment; a senate elected annually; the right of defendants in libel cases to plead the truth of their assertions; a curtailment of executive patronage; and, to sanction all of the above, a constitutional convention.

A result of Duane's disappointment was a bitter print war with his former associate in the London Corresponding Society, John Binns, Snyder's trusted advisor and, from 1807, editor in Philadelphia of the Democratic Press. Their feud did much to discredit radical republicanism and to embolden nativist protests against "foreign extremists". The influence and readership of the Aurora declined. In 1822, Duane "dropped his editorial pen", and in 1824 the paper ceased publication.

In his last years, Duane joined Democrats in opposing the revived Bank of the United States. The argument that a national regulation of public credit was a threat to constitutional liberties was taken up by his son William John Duane. In 1833, President Andrew Jackson (whom Binns had vehemently opposed) appointed the younger Duane U.S. Secretary of the Treasury.

== South America ==
Duane supported the movements in Spanish America for independence (a cause for which many United Irishmen volunteered their services), He befriended the patriot exile from New Grenada, Manuel Torres, regularly publishing in the Aurora Torres's views and accounts of the independence struggle. Torres, in turn, translated Spanish-American pamphlets for Duane, and Duane's editorials into Spanish.

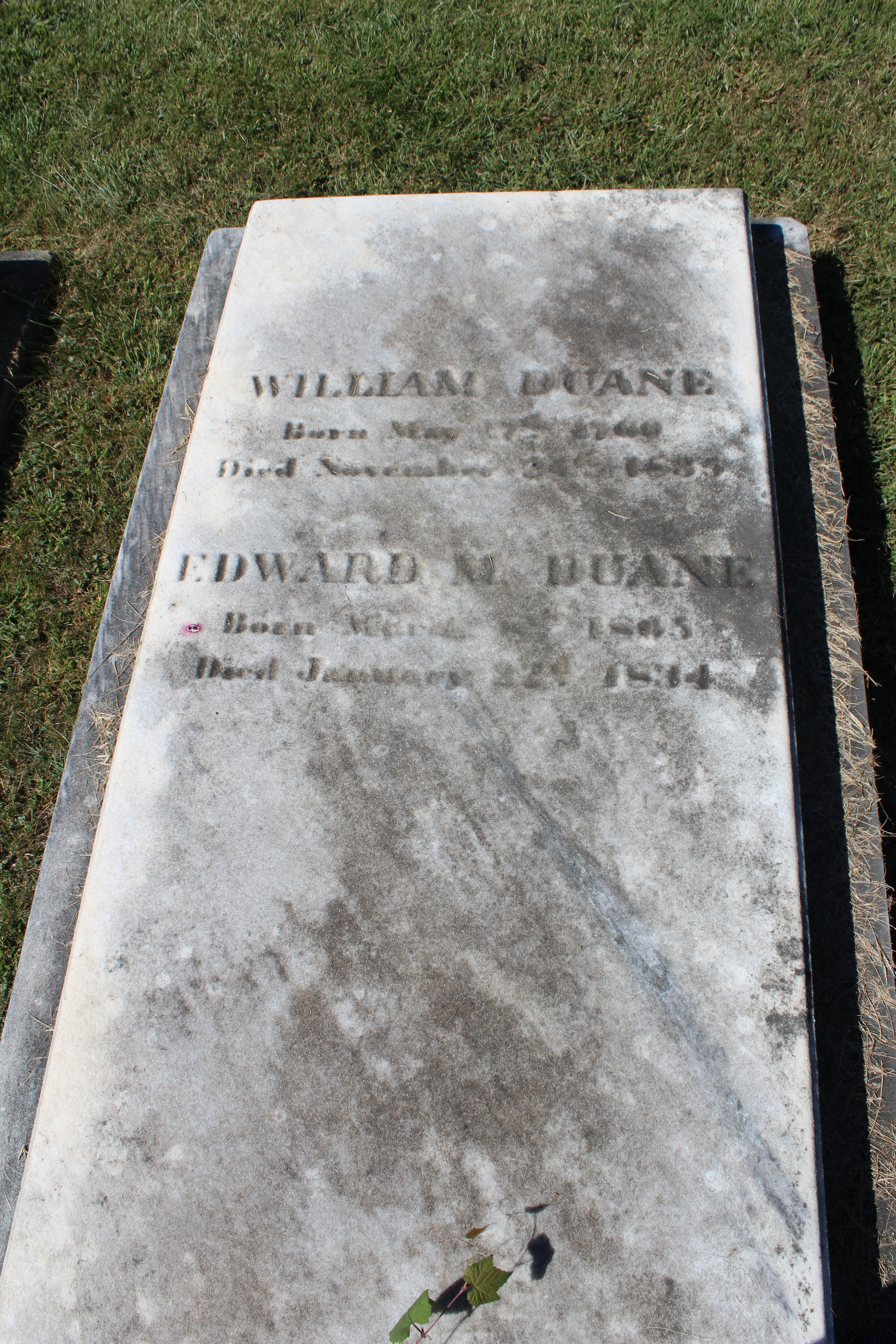
William Duane tombstone in Laurel Hill Cemetery

The Congreso General de la Gran Colombia held in 1821 expressed its gratitude to Duane, and with his friend Torres appointed his country's first ambassador to Washington, Duane travelled to the new republic in 1822. Duane's extensive observations on social and political conditions made on a 1,300-mile journey through the territories that, in 1831, were to divide into the present-day republics Columbia and Venezuela, informed A Visit to Columbia in the Years 1822 & 1823 (Philadelphia, 1826).

Duane also had sufficient prestige to visit Bolivia, and to be successful there in collecting Bolivian debts for a commission. His standing in Washington, however, was not sufficient for him to secure a hoped-for ambassadorship in Bogotá or other southern capital.

== Death ==
William Duane died in Philadelphia in 1835 at the age of 76 and was interred at Laurel Hill Cemetery. His obituary in the New York Star described him as "an able, indefatigable, and persevering writer of the old democratic school".

== Selected works on line ==
- A letter to George Washington, president of the United States: containing strictures on his address of the seventeenth of September, 1796, notifying his relinquishment of the presidential office. Philadelphia: Benjamin Franklin Bache,1796.
- A Caution: or Reflections on the Current Dispute between the French and American Republics, with John Dickenson, Philadelphia: Pennsylvania Historical Society, 1798.
- Politics for American Farmers: being a series of tracts on the blessings of free government, as it is administered in the United States, compared with the boasted stupendous fabric of British Monarchy, Washington City: R.C. Weightman, 1807.
- A Hand Book for Infantry: Containing the First Principles of Military Discipline, Founded on the Rational Method Intended to Explain in a Familiar and Practical Manner, For the Use of the Military Force of the United States, The Modern Improvements in the Discipline and Movement of Armies, Philadelphia, 1814
- A Visit to Columbia, in the Years 1822 & 1823, Philadelphia: Thomas H. Palmer, 1826

== Biographic references ==
- Bushey, Glenn Leroy (1938). "William Duane, Crusader for Judicial Reform". Pennsylvania History: A Journal of Mid-Atlantic Studies. 5 (3): 141–56. JSTOR 27766303.
- Clark, Allan C. (1906). "William Duane". Records of the Columbia Historical Society, Washington, D.C. 9: 14–62. JSTOR 40066936.
- Little, Nigel (2015). Transoceanic Radical : National Identity and Empire, 1760-1835. Hoboken: Taylor and Francis. ISBN 978-1-317-31459-2. OCLC 918621925.
- Phillips, Kim T. (1977). "William Duane, Philadelphia's Democratic Republicans, and the Origins of Modern Politics". The Pennsylvania Magazine of History and Biography. 101 (3): 365–87. JSTOR 20091178.
- Pratt, John (1971), Independence National Historical Park: The Home and Office of William Duane (Publisher of the Aurora) 316 Market Street, Philadelphia, Historic Structure Report. Washington D.C.: Office of History and Historic Architecture Eastern Service Sector, United States Department of the Interior, National Park Service
- Rosenfeld, Richard N.; Duane, William (1998). American Aurora : a Democratic-Republican returns : the suppressed history of our nation's beginnings and the heroic newspaper that tried to report it. New York: St. Martin's Griffin. ISBN 0-312-19437-4. OCLC 40942824.
