= Hartman Bache =

American engineer (1798–1872)

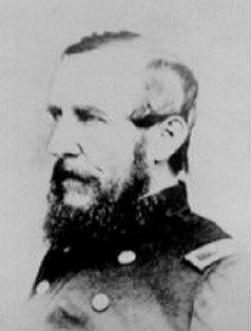
- Born: September 3, 1798; Philadelphia, Pennsylvania U.S.
- Died: October 8, 1872 (aged 74); Philadelphia, Pennsylvania, U.S.
- Burial place: Woodlands Cemetery, Philadelphia
- Relatives: Benjamin Franklin Bache (father); Richard Bache (grandfather); Benjamin Franklin (great-grandfather); George Meade (brother-in-law)
- Military career
- Allegiance: United States of America; Union
- Branch: United States Army
- Service years: 1818–1867
- Rank: Colonel; Brevet Brigadier General
- Conflicts: American Civil War

Hartman Bache (/ˈbiːtʃ/ BEECH; September 3, 1798 – October 8, 1872) was an American military engineer who participated in the construction of many of the earliest lighthouses on the West Coast. He made a number of sketches of these lighthouses and light stations which have since become an important resource in the study of American lighthouses. He was also involved in the construction of railroads, canals, and defenses.

Hartman Bache was the youngest son of journalist Benjamin Franklin Bache (who died a week after his birth) and the great-grandson of Benjamin Franklin. He graduated from the United States Military Academy in 1818. Despite his low class rank (19th out of 23), he was immediately commissioned as a captain in the Corps of Topographical Engineers. In 1829 he married Maria del Carmen Meade, the daughter of merchant Richard W. Meade and sister of Civil War general George Meade.

In 1831, Bache was elected as a member to the American Philosophical Society.

At the start of the Civil War in 1861, Bache was a lighthouse engineer with the rank of major. Shortly afterwards, he succeeded John James Abert as Chief of Topographical Engineers, spending much of the war serving on the East Coast. He was brevetted to brigadier general in March 1865, and retired in March 1867. Bache died in his hometown of Philadelphia, and was buried in Woodlands Cemetery.

== See also ==
- List of American Civil War brevet generals (Union)
