= Cramer brothers =

Swiss publishers

The Cramer brothers, Gabriel and Philibert Cramer, were 18th century publishers from Geneva and the official publishers of Voltaire. Their company, (sometimes called simply Cramer) published in a wide range of cities throughout Europe. The brothers were also active in high society.
