= Seaton Schroeder =

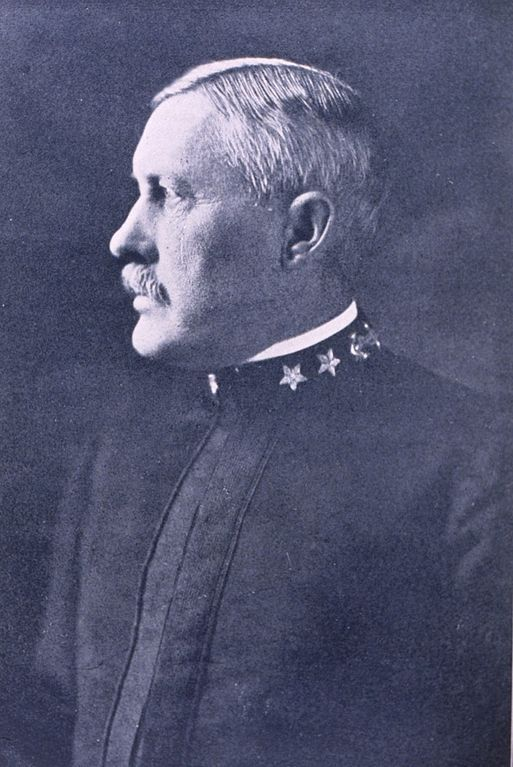
- Born: August 17, 1849; Washington City, U.S. (now Washington, D.C.)
- Died: October 19, 1922 (aged 73); Washington, D.C., U.S.
- Burial place: Congressional Cemetery, Washington, D.C., U.S.
- Spouse: Maria Campbell Bache Wainwright (m. 1879)
- Children: 5
- Military career
- Allegiance: United States
- Branch: United States Navy
- Service years: 1864–1922
- Rank: Rear admiral
- Commands: Vesuvius; Yosemite; Brutus; Virginia; Atlantic Fleet
- Conflicts: American Civil War; Spanish–American War; World War I

Seaton Schroeder (August 17, 1849 – October 19, 1922) was an admiral of the United States Navy. He contributed to the development of the Driggs-Schroeder rapid-fire gun.

== Biography ==
Schroeder was born in Washington, D.C., the son of Francis Schroeder, the Resident Minister to Sweden. His mother was the daughter of William Winston Seaton, who, with his brother-in-law, Joseph Gales, owned and edited the National Intelligencer. Seaton served as the Mayor of Washington, D.C., from 1840 to 1850.

He entered the United States Naval Academy in 1864, which, because of the American Civil War, was in Newport, Rhode Island. After graduating in June 1868 he served with the Pacific Fleet in 1868-9 under Admiral John Rodgers in the screw sloop Benicia and fought in the Salt River near Seoul, Korea. His sea tours took him to Alaska, Japan, and the Philippines in Saginaw, to the West Indies in Canandaigua, and on a world cruise in Swatara.

== Marriage and family ==
Schroeder married Maria Campbell Bache Wainwright on January 16, 1879. The couple had five children.

Maria Wainwright (born March 14, 1856, Washington, D.C.), came from a family of several American statesmen. She was the great-great-granddaughter of Benjamin Franklin, the great-granddaughter of Treasury Secretary Alexander J. Dallas, the granddaughter of Texas legislator Richard Bache, Jr., a niece of Vice President George Mifflin Dallas, the daughter of naval officer Richard Wainwright, and the sister of Admiral Richard Wainwright.

She died on July 12, 1926, aged 70 in Jamestown, Rhode Island.

== Career ==
After specializing in hydrographic duties for 11 years, he spent two years in the Office of Naval Intelligence (ONI) where he helped develop the Driggs-Schroeder rapid-fire gun in partnership with Navy Commander William H. Driggs. He returned to sea in 1890 as the Commanding Officer of Vesuvius. In 1893, he began a three-year tour as an ordnance officer for the Naval Gun Factory at the Washington Navy Yard and as the recorder of the Board of Inspection and Survey, joining the Board as a member in 1894.

Following his appointment as executive officer of the battleship Massachusetts (BB-2), he participated in the American blockade of Santiago, Cuba, during the Spanish–American War and was advanced three numbers in rank "for eminent and conspicuous conduct in battle" during five engagements between May 31 and July 4, 1898.

He was appointed Naval governor of Guam in April 1900, holding held that position until 1903. He commanded Yosemite and later, Brutus (AC-15). On May 1, 1903, Schroeder became Chief Intelligence Officer of the Navy. He assumed command of Virginia (BB-13) upon her first commissioning on May 7, 1906 and afterwards commanded various divisions in the Atlantic Fleet.

Promoted to rear admiral in 1908, he hoisted his flag on Connecticut (BB-18) when he took command of the Atlantic Fleet on March 8, 1909. Two months later, Schroeder was assigned to the Navy General Board. Schroeder was placed on the retired list on August 17, 1911, and retired to his home in Jamestown, Rhode Island.

Rear Admiral Schroeder was recalled to active duty in 1912 to prepare a new signal book, and again in World War I to serve as Chief Hydrographer and the Navy representative on the United States Geographic Board. He died at the Naval Hospital, Washington, D.C., on October 19, 1922.

== Legacy ==
- In 1942, the destroyer USS Schroeder (DD-501) was named in his honor.
- Seaton Blvd. in the capital city of Guam, Hagåtña, was named after him.
- One of the 10 Southern Mountains of Guam was renamed from Finacresta to Mt. Schroeder (288m).

Military offices
Preceded by Richard P. Leary	Naval Governor of Guam; 1900–1901	Succeeded by William Swift
Preceded by William Swift	Naval Governor of Guam; 1901–1903	Succeeded by William Elbridge Sewell
Preceded by Charles D. Sigsbee	Head of the Office of Naval Intelligence (Chief Intelligence Officer); May 1903–April 1906	Succeeded by Raymond P. Rodgers
Preceded by Charles S. Sperry	Commander-in-Chief of the U.S. Atlantic Fleet; 1909-1911	Succeeded by Hugo Osterhaus
