= William Swift =

United States admiral

- Born: March 17, 1848; Windham, Connecticut
- Died: June 30, 1919 (aged 71); Newport, Rhode Island
- Burial place: Richfield Springs, New York
- Military career
- Allegiance: United States
- Branch: United States Navy
- Service years: 1867–1910
- Rank: Rear Admiral
- Commands: Prairie; Concord; Princeton; Yorktown; Connecticut
- Conflicts: Spanish–American War

William Swift (March 17, 1848 – June 30, 1919) was a rear admiral in the United States Navy, and briefly the Naval Governor of Guam in 1901. He was court-martialed in 1907 for the grounding of the battleship Connecticut (BB-18), and briefly suspended from duty. In 1910, he headed the aptly named Swift Board which reorganized the Department of the Navy prior to World War I.

== Early life and career ==
Swift was born in Windham, Connecticut, and entered the Navy with the rank of midshipman on 25 September 1863, graduating from the United States Naval Academy in June 1867. He was promoted to ensign on 18 December 1868, then to master on 21 March 1870, lieutenant on 21 March 1871, lieutenant commander on 24 October 1889, and commander on 6 April 1897.

Swift served as Executive Officer aboard the battleship Indiana (BB-1) in 1896 under Robley "Fighting Bob" Evans.

During the Spanish–American War, he was the Inspector of Ordnance in the New York Naval Yard, with a rank of commander. On May 28, 1900, he was given command of the auxiliary cruiser Prairie. On April 6, he was transferred to command of the gunboat Concord. In May 1901, he was transferred again, this time to the gunboat Princeton, then transferred to command of Yorktown in June. While commanding Yorktown in the Pacific, he was briefly appointed as Governor of Guam to allow then-Governor Seaton Schroeder to return to Washington, D.C. to testify in the Schley Inquiry. Swift served in this capacity from early August to early October 1901, before resuming command of Yorktown.

On June 25, 1902, Swift was promoted to captain and subsequently assigned to the General Board of the Navy. In that role, he was responsible for inspecting naval yards and shipbuilding efforts on the Atlantic coast. He was also chairman of the Board's Committee on the Fleet. He subsequently was appointed to the Joint Board of the Army and Navy.

== Grounding of USS Connecticut ==
On September 30, 1906, Swift was given command of the battleship Connecticut (BB-18), then the largest warship in the fleet, on her maiden voyage. The ship sailed on its first mission to Cuba in January 1907, but was immediately recalled to New York after an outbreak of typhoid fever among the crew. Immediately after setting out again, the Connecticut ran aground at Culebra, Puerto Rico.

According to The Washington Post, Swift acted against the advice of his navigator and ordered the ship to pass on the wrong side of a navigational buoy and caused it to strike a shoal. (Also according to the Post, he claimed that the "sun was in his eyes".) He was court martialed on March 26, 1907, and found guilty of dereliction of duty. He was suspended from duty for a year, later remitted to nine months, but was allowed to return to shore duty after six months. He was subsequently appointed as Commandant of the Charlestown Navy Yard near Boston, Massachusetts on November 8, 1907.

== Later career ==
Swift was promoted to rear admiral on January 30, 1908. Swift retired due to his age on his 62nd birthday on March 17, 1908, but acted as an adviser to the Secretary on navy yard and industrial affairs. In December 1909, he was assigned to the Naval Bureau of Materials and was appointed by Secretary of the Navy George von Lengerke Meyer to head the so-called "Swift Board" to reorganize the Department of the Navy.

Admiral Swift died at the Naval Hospital in Newport, Rhode Island on June 30, 1919, and was buried in the town of Richfield Springs, New York.

Military offices
Preceded by Seaton Schroeder	Naval Governor of Guam; 1901	Succeeded by Seaton Schroeder
