= Fort Warren (Massachusetts) =

US military fortification in Boston Harbor

- U.S. National Register of Historic Places
- U.S. National Historic Landmark District
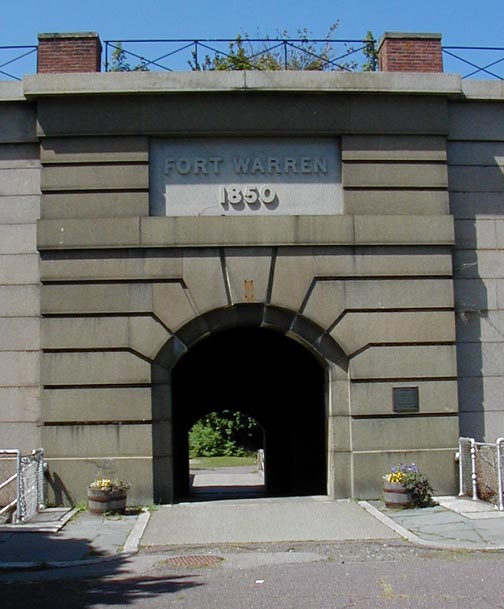
- Fort Warren's sally port

- Location within Massachusetts Location within the United States
- Interactive map of Fort Warren
- Location: Boston, Massachusetts
- Coordinates: 42°19′12.84″N 070°55′39.5″W
- Area: 40 acres (16 ha)
- Built: 1834–1860
- Architect: Thayer, Lt. Col. Sylvanus; Army Corps of Engineers
- Architectural style: Third System fort
- Part of: American Civil War prison camps (1861–1865); Harbor Defenses of Boston (1899–1947)
- NRHP reference No.: 70000540

Significant dates
- Added to NRHP: August 29, 1970
- Designated NHLD: August 29, 1970

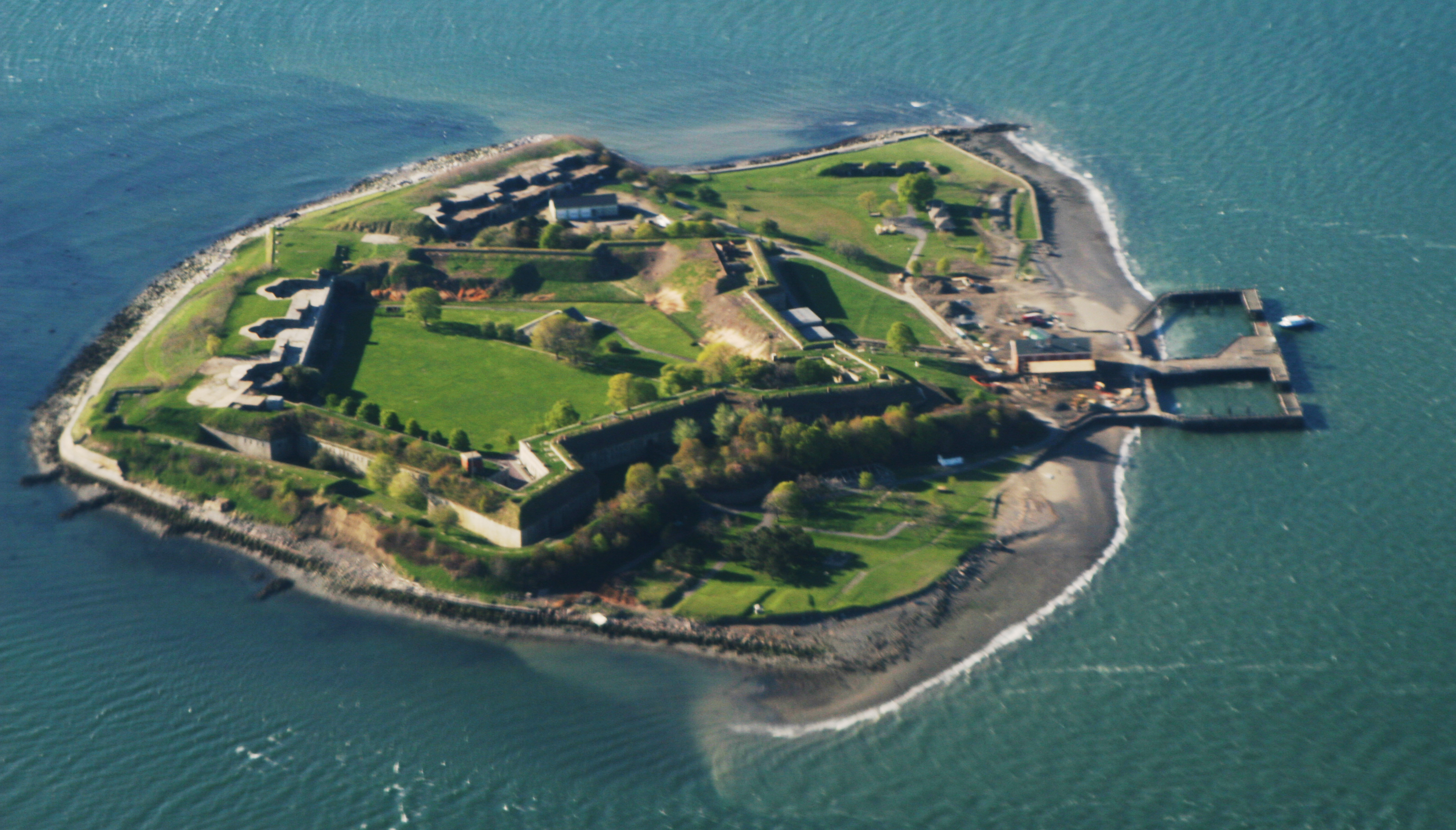
Aerial photo of Georges Island and Fort Warren

Fort Warren is a historic fort on the 28-acre (110,000 m^{2}) Georges Island at the entrance to Boston Harbor. The fort is named for Revolutionary War hero Dr. Joseph Warren, who sent Paul Revere on his famous ride, and was later killed at the Battle of Bunker Hill. The name was transferred in 1833 from the first Fort Warren – built in 1808 – which was renamed Fort Winthrop.

Fort Warren is a pentagonal bastion fort, made with stone and granite, and was constructed from 1833 to 1861, completed shortly after the beginning of the American Civil War. Fort Warren defended the harbor in Boston, Massachusetts, from 1861 through the end of World War II, and during the Civil War served as a prison for Confederate officers and government officials, including Confederate Vice President Alexander H. Stephens. The fort remained active through the Spanish–American War and World War I, and was re-activated during World War II. It was permanently decommissioned in 1947, and is now a tourist site. It was designated a National Historic Landmark in 1970 as a masterpiece of coastal engineering of the pre-Civil War period, and for its role in the Civil War.

== Early history ==
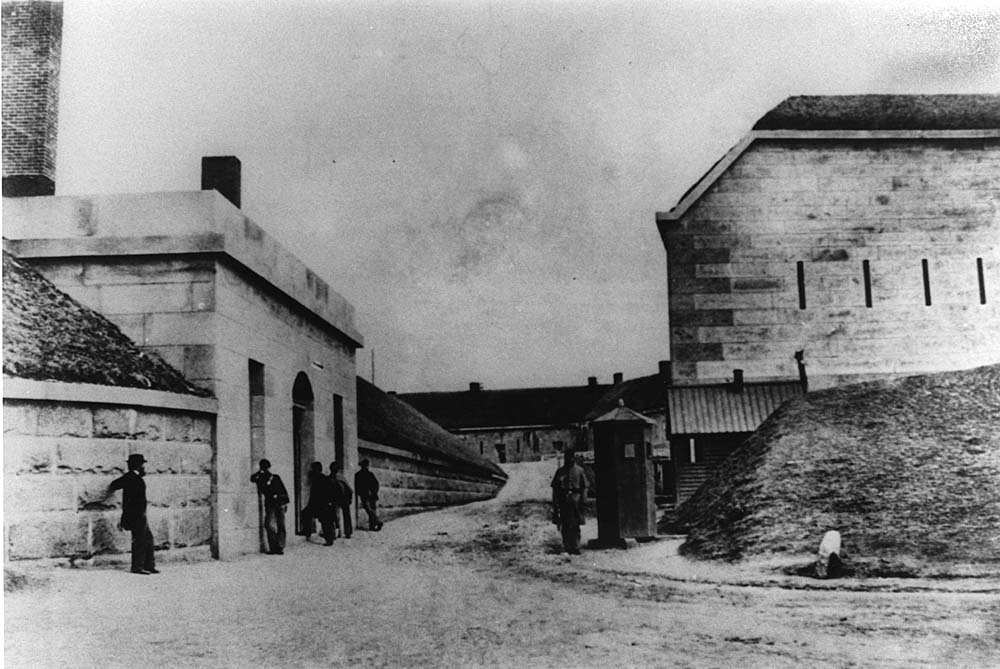
Guardhouse (left) and sentry box (right) about 1861

Fort Warren was built from 1833 to 1861 and was completed shortly after the beginning of the American Civil War as part of the third system of US fortifications.

The Army engineer in charge during the bulk of the fort's construction was Colonel Sylvanus Thayer, who is best known for his tenure as Superintendent of the United States Military Academy at West Point, New York. It was the fifth largest of the 42 third system forts. The overall plan was pentagonal in shape, slightly irregular to make the best use of the island's terrain. The fort features excellent granite work. A demilune (half-moon) battery protecting the north sally port is a rare feature in US forts. The fort was originally designed for over 200 guns, including some mortars and flank howitzers. During the Civil War it was armed with 15-inch and 10-inch Rodman smoothbore guns.

== Civil War ==
During the Civil War, the island fort served as a prison for captured Confederate army and navy personnel, elected civil officials from the state of Maryland, and Northern political prisoners. The fort was commanded by Colonel Justin Dimick from 1861 to 1864. Dimick was noted for his humane and compassionate treatment of the Confederate prisoners held at the fort. Of over 1,000 Confederate prisoners at the fort, only 13 died there, giving Fort Warren a much lower mortality rate than any other prisoner of war camp (Union or Confederate) during the Civil War.

James M. Mason and John Slidell, the Confederate diplomats seized in the Trent affair, were among those held at the fort. Confederate military officers held at Fort Warren included Richard S. Ewell, Isaac R. Trimble, John Gregg, Adam "Stovepipe" Johnson, Simon Bolivar Buckner Sr., and Lloyd Tilghman. High-ranking civilians held at Fort Warren include Confederate Vice President Alexander H. Stephens and Confederate Postmaster General John Henninger Reagan. The prison camp had a reputation for humane treatment of its detainees. When the camp commander's son, Lieutenant Justin E. Dimick, left Fort Warren for active duty in the field with the Second U.S. Artillery, he was given a letter from Confederate officers in the camp urging good care should he be captured. (He was later mortally wounded at Chancellorsville in May, 1863.)

On August 19, 1863, six prisoners of war attempted an escape from the prison. Two were caught while still on the island, two were caught while sailing toward Canada and the prison authorities claimed to believe that the other two drowned, no trace of them after swimming toward shore apparently having been found.

The famous Union marching song John Brown's Body was written at the fort using a tune from an old Methodist camp song, and was performed at a flag-raising there on 12 May 1861. The song was carried to the Army of the Potomac by the men of the "Webster Regiment" (12th Massachusetts Infantry), who had mustered in at Fort Warren. Julia Ward Howe heard this song while visiting Washington, DC. At the suggestion of her minister, Howe was encouraged to write new words. The Battle Hymn of the Republic, which was initially published as a poem, was later matched with the melody of the "John Brown" song and became one of the best remembered songs of the Civil War era.

== Post–Civil War through Endicott Period ==
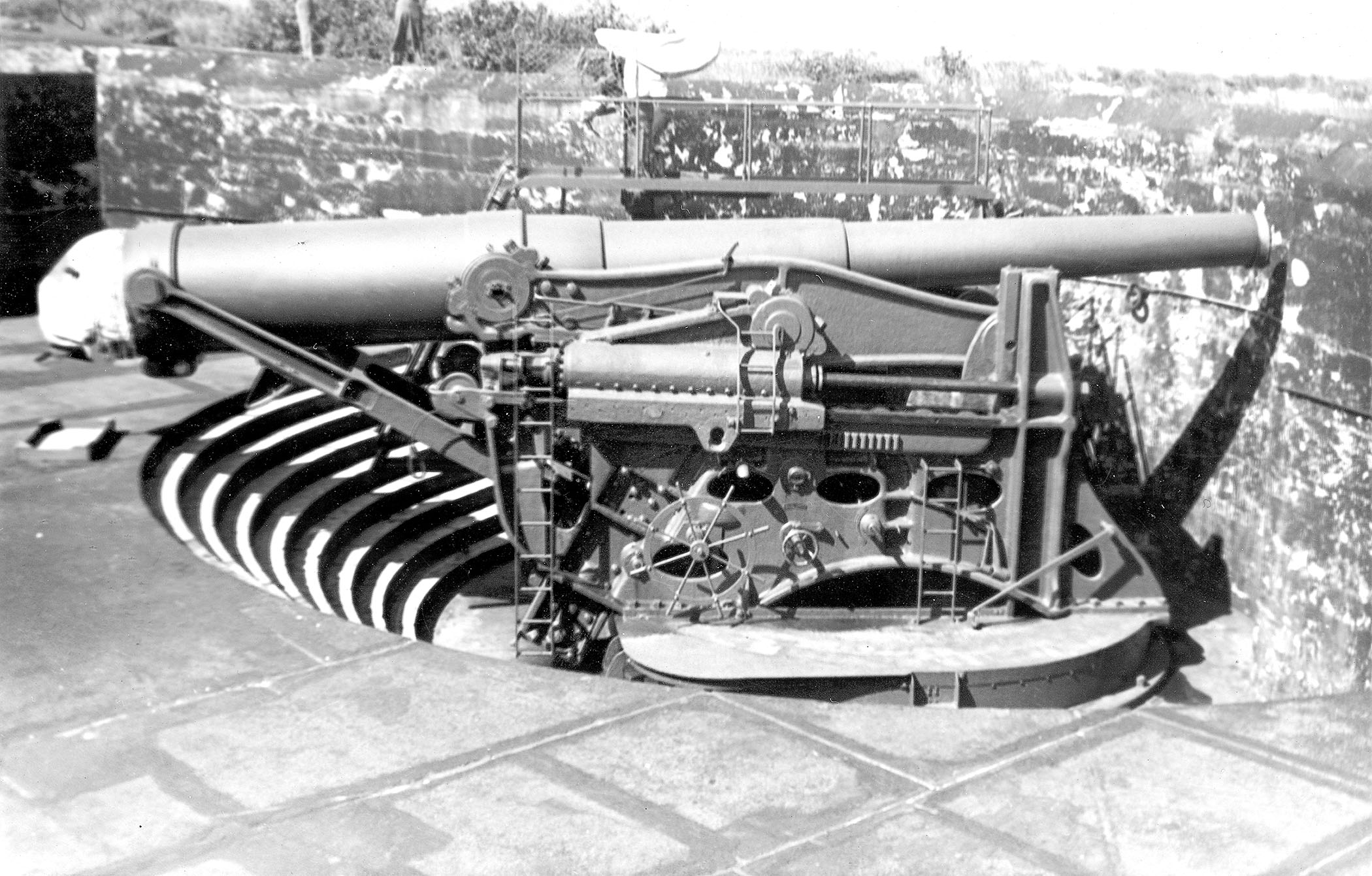
12-inch gun on disappearing carriage, similar to those at Fort Warren.

In the 1870s Fort Warren was upgraded with new barbette batteries on the parapets along with a six-gun external battery; these were armed with Rodman guns. A plaque at the fort states that the southeast bastion was roofed over at this time to create a rare (possibly unique) casemated 15-inch Rodman gun battery. The massive brick arches built to enclose this bastion are impressive.

From 1892 to 1903 Fort Warren was rebuilt to accommodate modern breech-loading rifled guns under the Endicott program. Five batteries were added to the fort, replacing some of the older gun positions, as follows:

Name	No. of guns	Gun type	Carriage type	Years active
Adams	1	10-inch gun M1888	disappearing M1894	1899–1914
Bartlett	4	10-inch gun M1888	disappearing, 2 M1894, 2 M1896	1899–1942
Lowell	3	3-inch gun M1898	masking parapet M1898	1900–1920
Plunkett	2	4-inch gun M1896	pedestal M1896	1899–1920
Stevenson	2	12-inch gun M1895	disappearing M1897	1903–1944

The two 12-inch (305 mm) and five 10-inch (254 mm) guns were the fort's main armament against enemy battleships. For defense against smaller vessels, particularly to defend nearby mine fields against minesweepers, two 4-inch (102 mm) and three 3-inch (76 mm) guns were included. The 4-inch guns were a Navy design by Driggs-Schroeder, and in the whole US Army coast defense system only Fort Warren and Fort Washington in Maryland had this type of gun. Battery Adams was built of low-quality concrete and was disarmed and abandoned due to deterioration in 1914.

== World War I through World War II ==
Fort Warren was the headquarters of the Coast Defenses of Boston in World War I. In 1917–1918 the four 10-inch guns of Battery Bartlett were removed for potential service as railway artillery on the Western Front. Contrary to some references, although some 10-inch guns were shipped to France to be mounted as railway guns, none appear to have been used in action in World War I. Different 10-inch M1888 guns, including two from Battery Reilly at Fort Adams in Rhode Island and two from storage, replaced these weapons in 1919.

In 1920, with World War I over, several weapon types were withdrawn from Coast Artillery service. These included the 4-inch Driggs-Schroeder guns of Battery Plunkett and the 3-inch Driggs-Seabury guns of Battery Lowell. None of these were replaced. The 4-inch guns at Fort Warren remained as display pieces at least through 1941.

During World War II, the fort served as a control center for Boston Harbor's south mine field, a precaution taken in anticipation of potential attacks by Kriegsmarine U-boats. At that time, Fort Warren was garrisoned by the 241st Coast Artillery Regiment (Harbor Defense), a Massachusetts National Guard unit that was federalized in September, 1940. As new 16-inch batteries were built, particularly Battery Murphy at the East Point Military Reservation, Fort Warren's remaining guns were scrapped in 1942–1944. Fort Warren was permanently decommissioned after 1950. At some point an emplacement of Battery Bartlett was demolished for an access road.

== Decommissioning and opening to the public ==
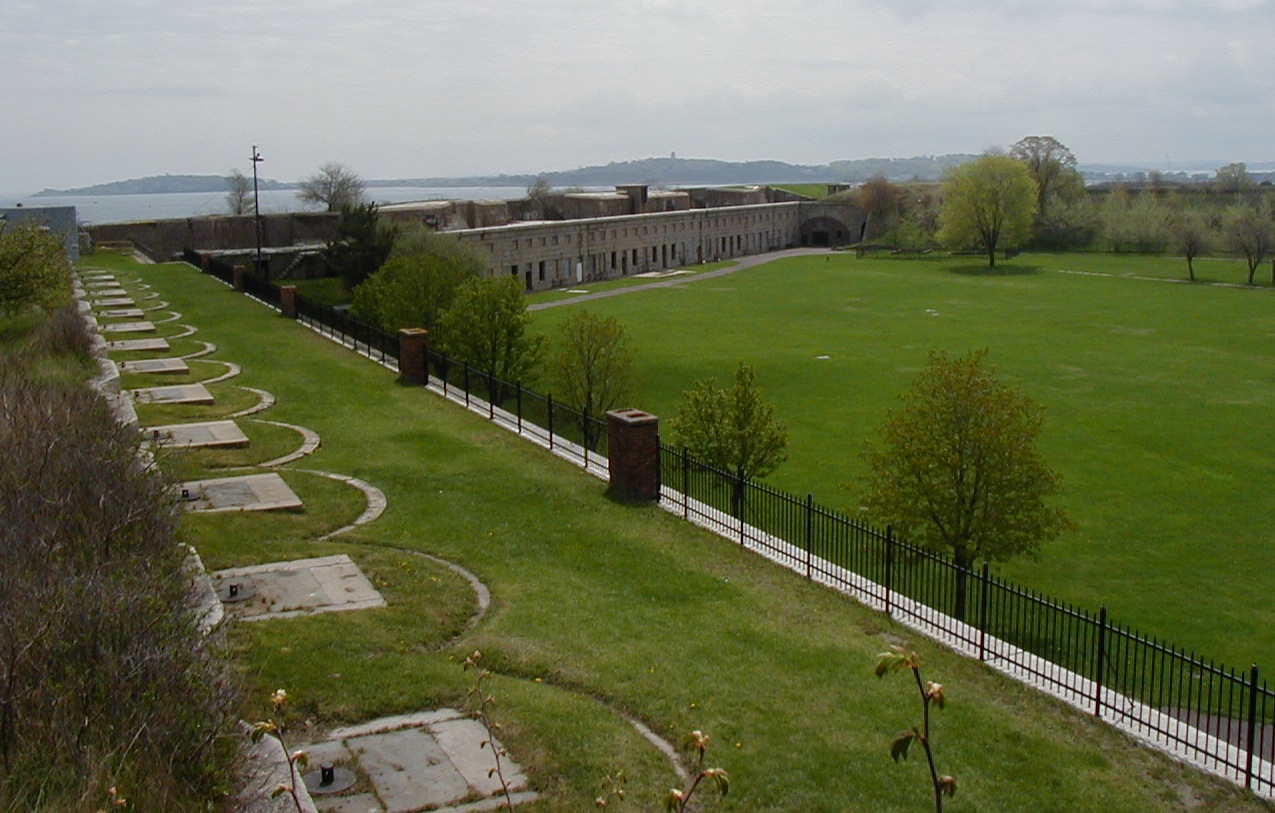
The parade ground of Fort Warren. Cannon once were mounted on the granite bases in the foreground.

Fort Warren was owned by the U.S. federal government until 1958, when the state obtained it from the General Services Administration. In 1961, the fort was reopened to the public after initial restoration.

Today, the Massachusetts Department of Conservation and Recreation maintains and administers the fort, which is the centerpiece of the Boston Harbor Islands National Recreation Area. The fort is reachable by ferry from downtown Boston, Hingham, or Hull to Georges Island. Transfers are then available for those who wish to visit some of the other Harbor Islands.

The fort is typically open from early or mid May through Columbus Day weekend. Park rangers offer guided tours, or you may explore on your own. An information booth just outside the sally port (the main entrance to the fort) posts information about available activities. The island offers a well-stocked snack bar, water fountains, and a large number of composting toilets. There is also a museum located in the old mine storehouse (the red brick building opposite the ferry dock), a number of picnic tables, and a children's play structure. The tops of several of the walls and several of the casemates and magazines beneath them are open to visitors. The dock side of the fort features two Civil War 3-inch rifled guns converted to breechloaders. 10-inch Rodman guns, projectiles from the Endicott era, and two World War II 40 mm Bofors guns are also at the fort. The museum includes a demonstration model of a disappearing gun and a Nike-Ajax missile.

=== Confederate memorial ===
The Commonwealth's only Confederate memorial, a headstone which commemorates 13 southern soldiers who died while imprisoned during the Civil War at the fort was housed on the island until 2017. The headstone marker was installed in 1963 by the Boston Chapter of the United Daughters of the Confederacy. Governor Charlie Baker called for the removal of the memorial in June 2017. The state subsequently covered over and removed the monument in October 2017 and stored it in the Massachusetts State Archives.

== Gallery ==
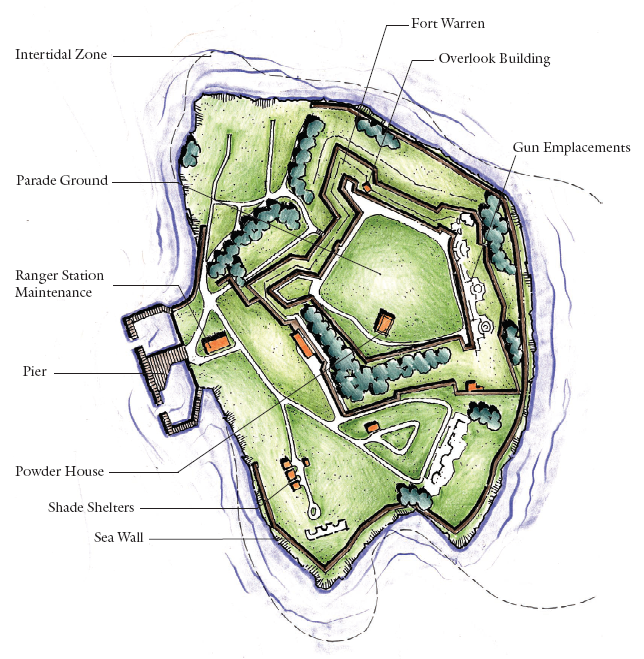
Map of Georges Island and Fort Warren

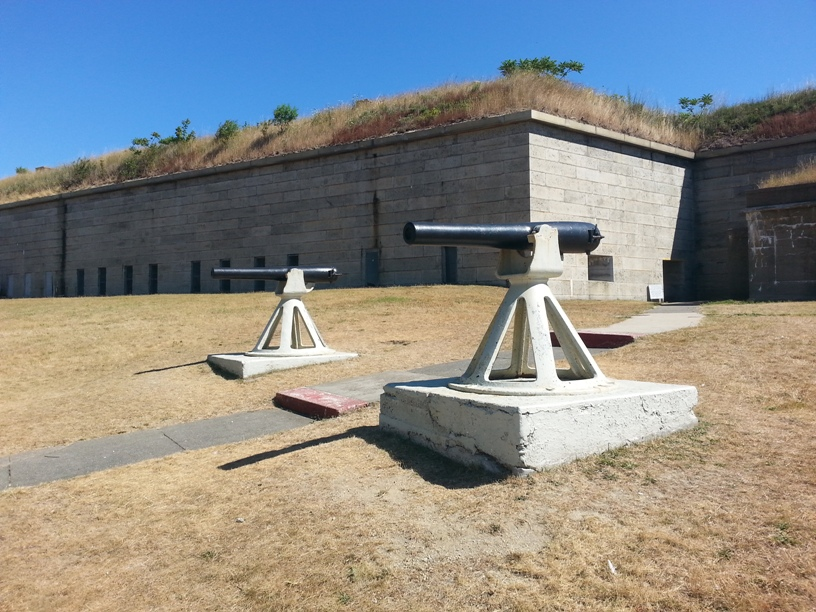
3-inch Ordnance rifles converted to breechloading saluting guns

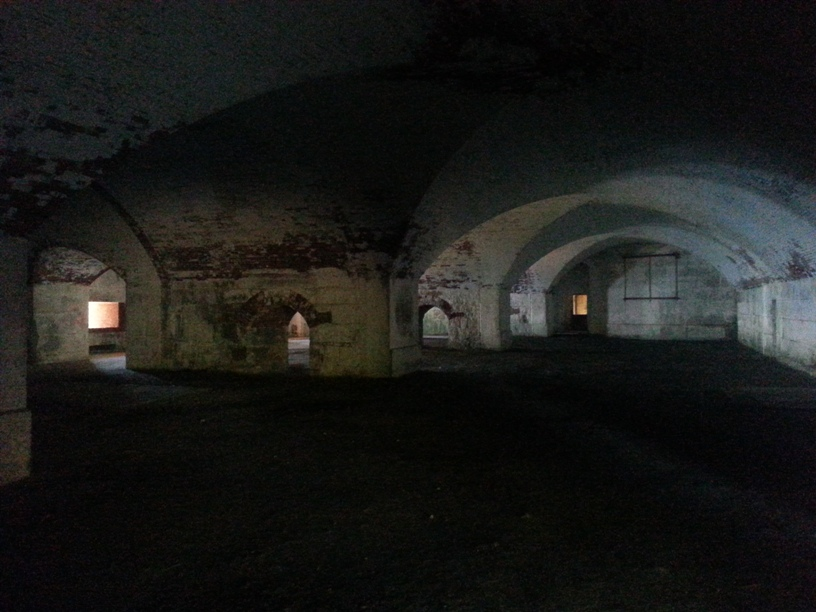
Inside the casemated, roofed-over southeast bastion

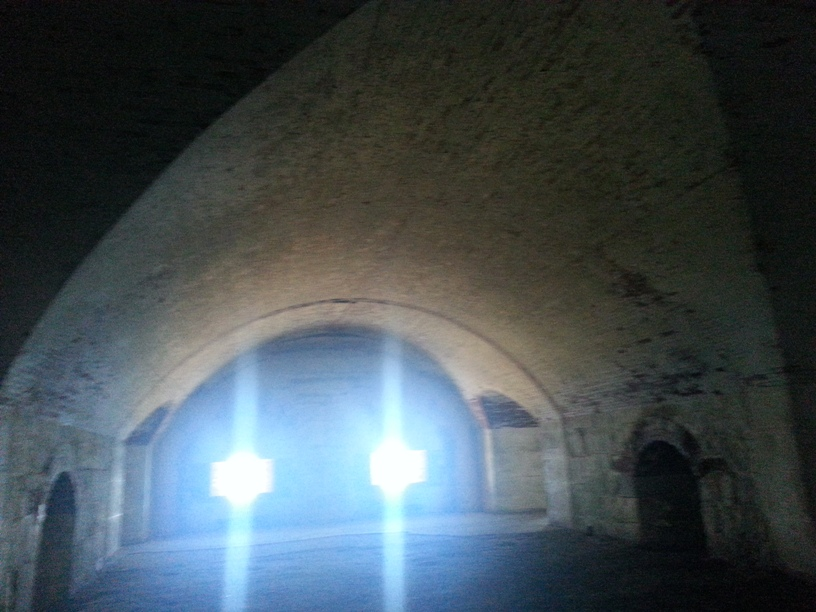
Two-gun casemate, southeast bastion

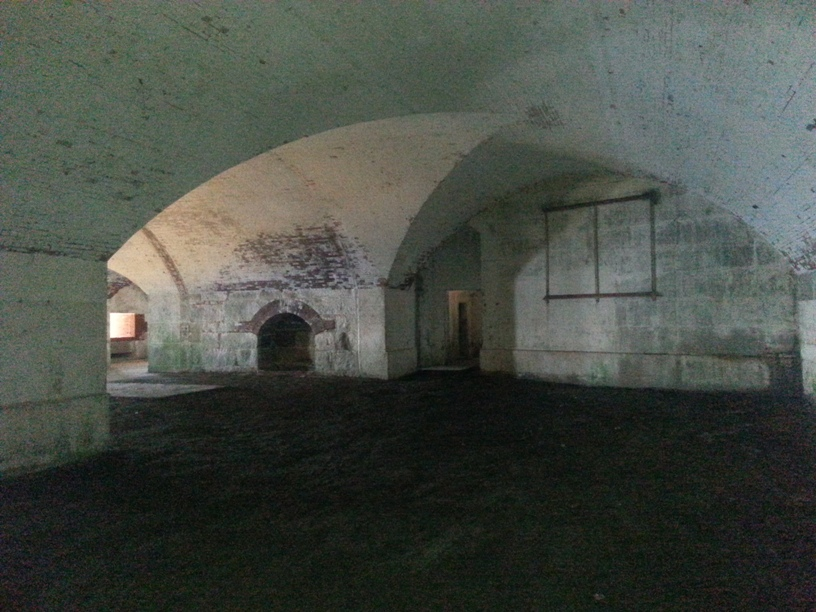
One of the large arches that encloses the southeast bastion

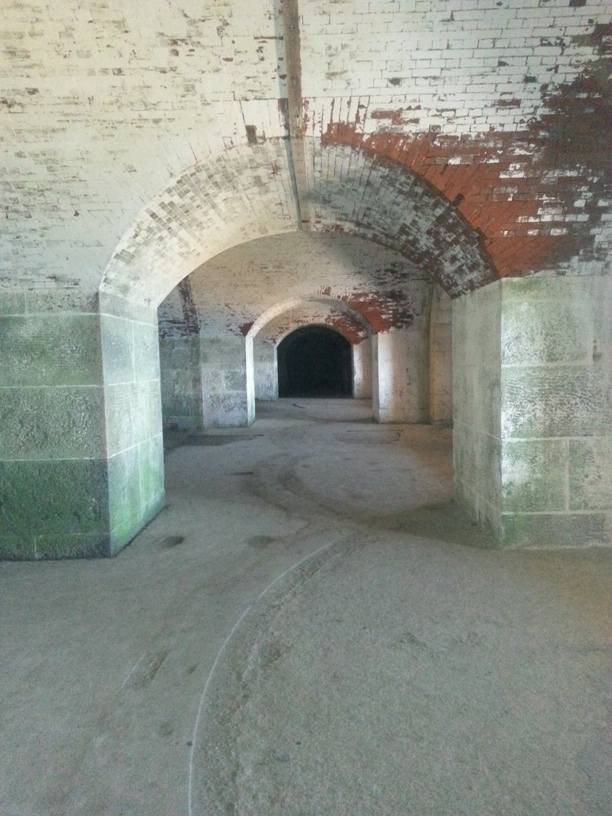
A line of arches connecting casemates

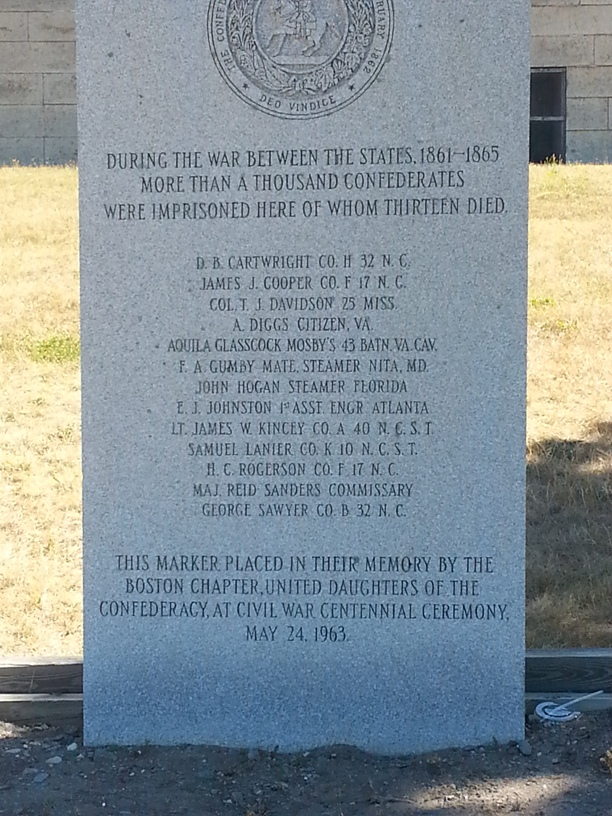
Memorial to 13 Confederates who died as prisoners at Fort Warren

Memorial to Edward Rowe Snow, who fought to preserve Fort Warren

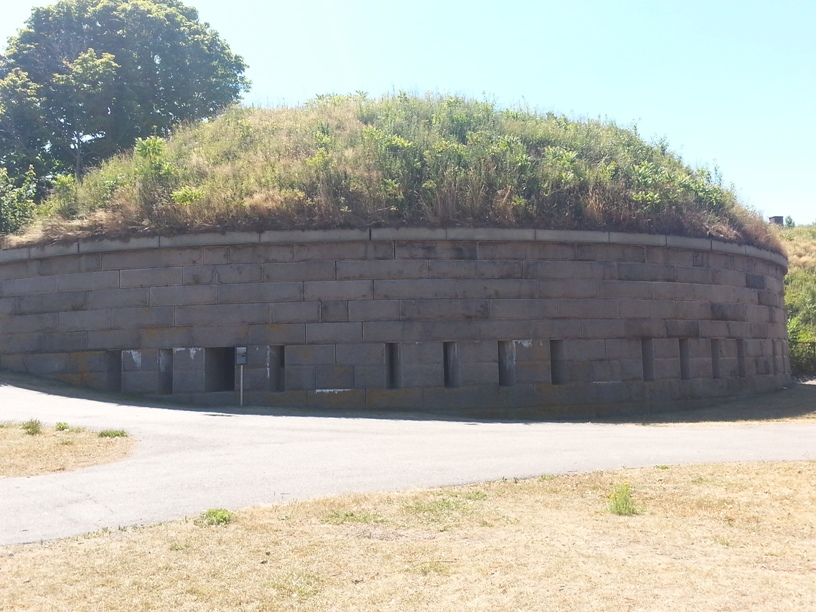
Demilune (half-moon) battery defending the sally port

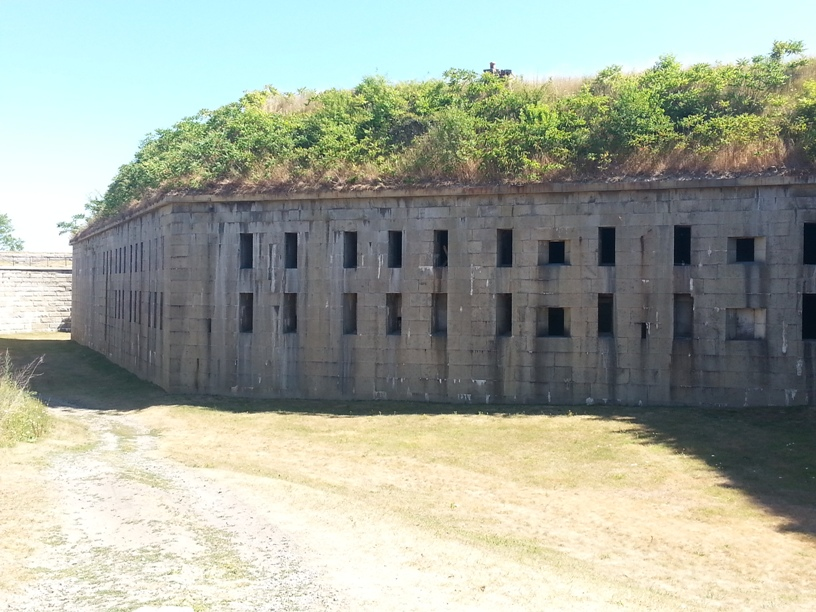
A flank defense

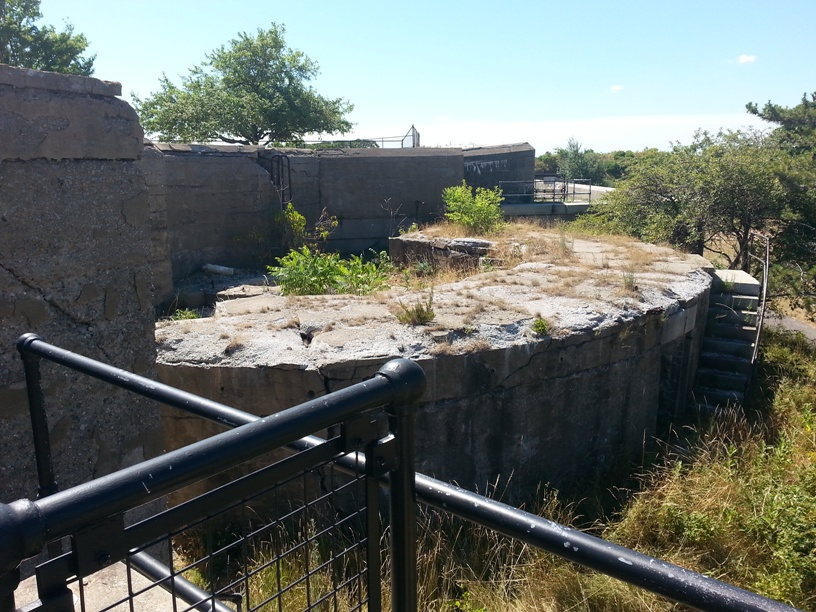
Battery Jack Adams, one 10-inch M1888 disappearing gun. Completed 1899, abandoned 1914 due to low-quality concrete.

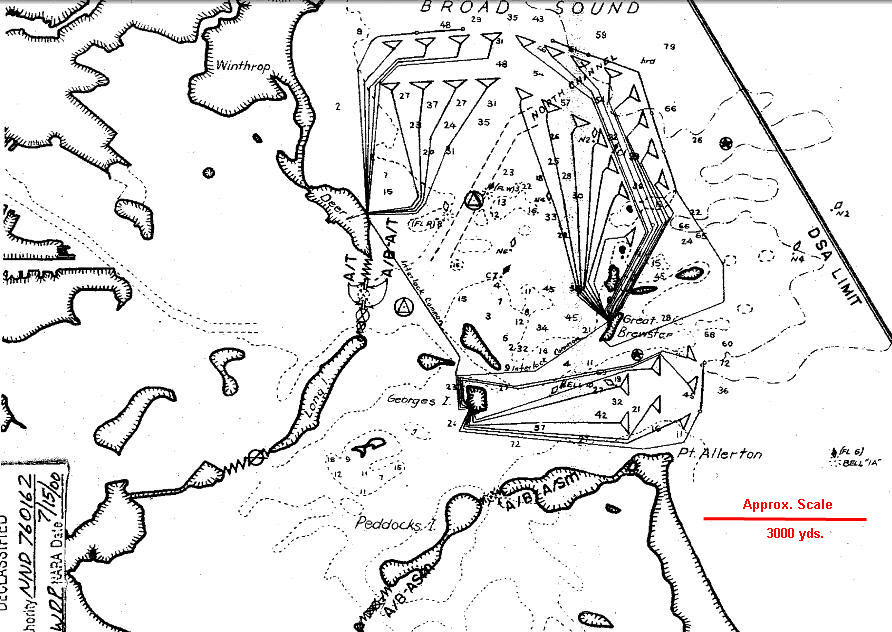
A 1945 map of the mine fields protecting Boston Harbor during World War II, showing mine groups controlled from Fort Warren on Georges Island

== See also ==
- List of Civil War POW prisons and camps
- 9th Coast Artillery (United States)
- 241st Coast Artillery (United States)
- List of National Historic Landmarks in Boston
- National Register of Historic Places listings in southern Boston, Massachusetts
- Seacoast defense in the United States
- United States Army Coast Artillery Corps
- List of military installations in Massachusetts
