= Driggs-Schroeder =

Type of naval gun

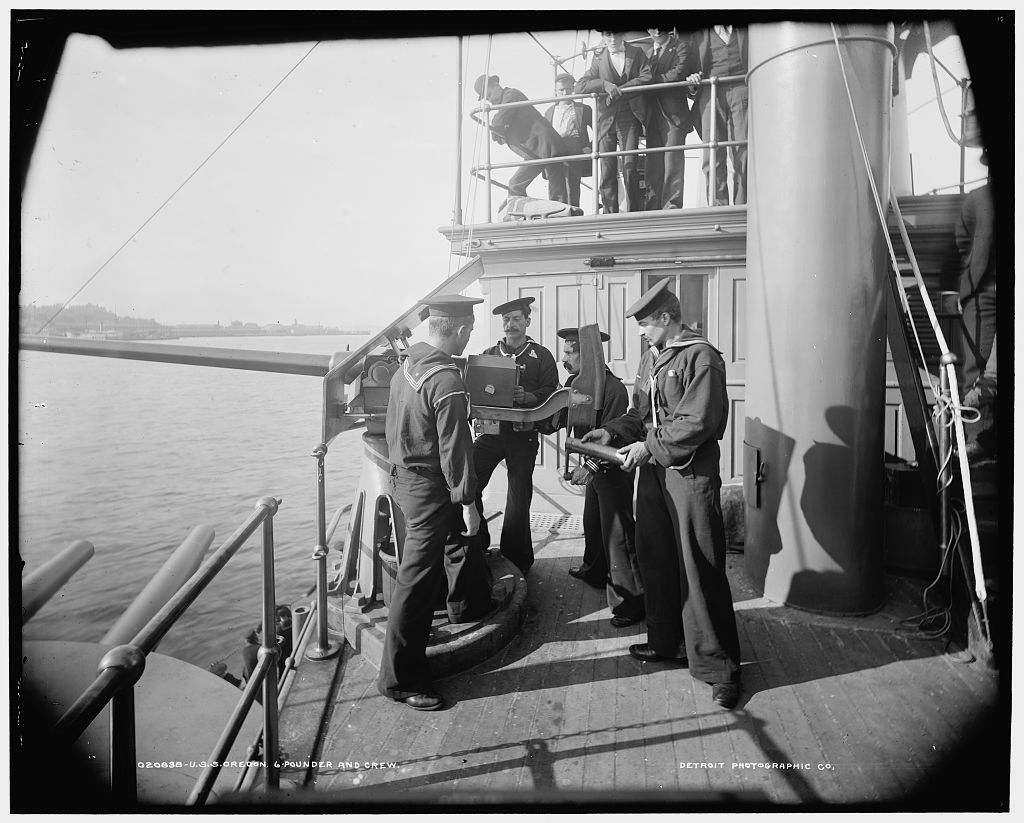
A Hotchkiss 6-pounder rapid-fire gun on USS Oregon (BB-3), generally similar to the Driggs-Schroeder 6-pounder. Their 1-pounder and 3-pounder rapid-fire guns were also of this configuration.

Driggs-Schroeder was the name of several naval guns designed by US Navy officers William H. Driggs and Seaton Schroeder for the United States Navy in the late 1880s, fitted on ships built in the 1890s. Some Driggs-Schroeder weapons were also adopted by the US Army.

These guns were initially produced by the William Cramp & Sons shipbuilding company, then a separate Drigg-Schroeder Ordnance Company was founded with Cramps' capital, which in 1896 was united with competing Hotchkiss Gun Company based in Rhode Island and the American Projectile Company from Massachusetts into American Ordnance Company headed by General Albert C. Ordway. Driggs later founded the Driggs-Seabury Ordnance Company in 1897, in partnership with his brother Louis Labadie "L. L." Driggs and Samuel Seabury, a retired US Navy officer.

Driggs-Schroeder weapons included 1-pounder, 3-pounder (Navy Marks 2 and 3), and 6-pounder (Navy Marks 6 and 8) naval guns. All were rapid-firing, i.e. they used brass cartridges with fixed projectiles. They were among numerous models of these guns equipped on US Navy ships of the 1890s. Unlike some other manufacturers, Driggs-Schroeder did not design fully automatic 1-pounder and 3-pounder guns. Most Driggs-Schroeder weapons were manufactured by the American Ordnance Company in Bridgeport, Connecticut, with some manufactured by Driggs Ordnance Company.

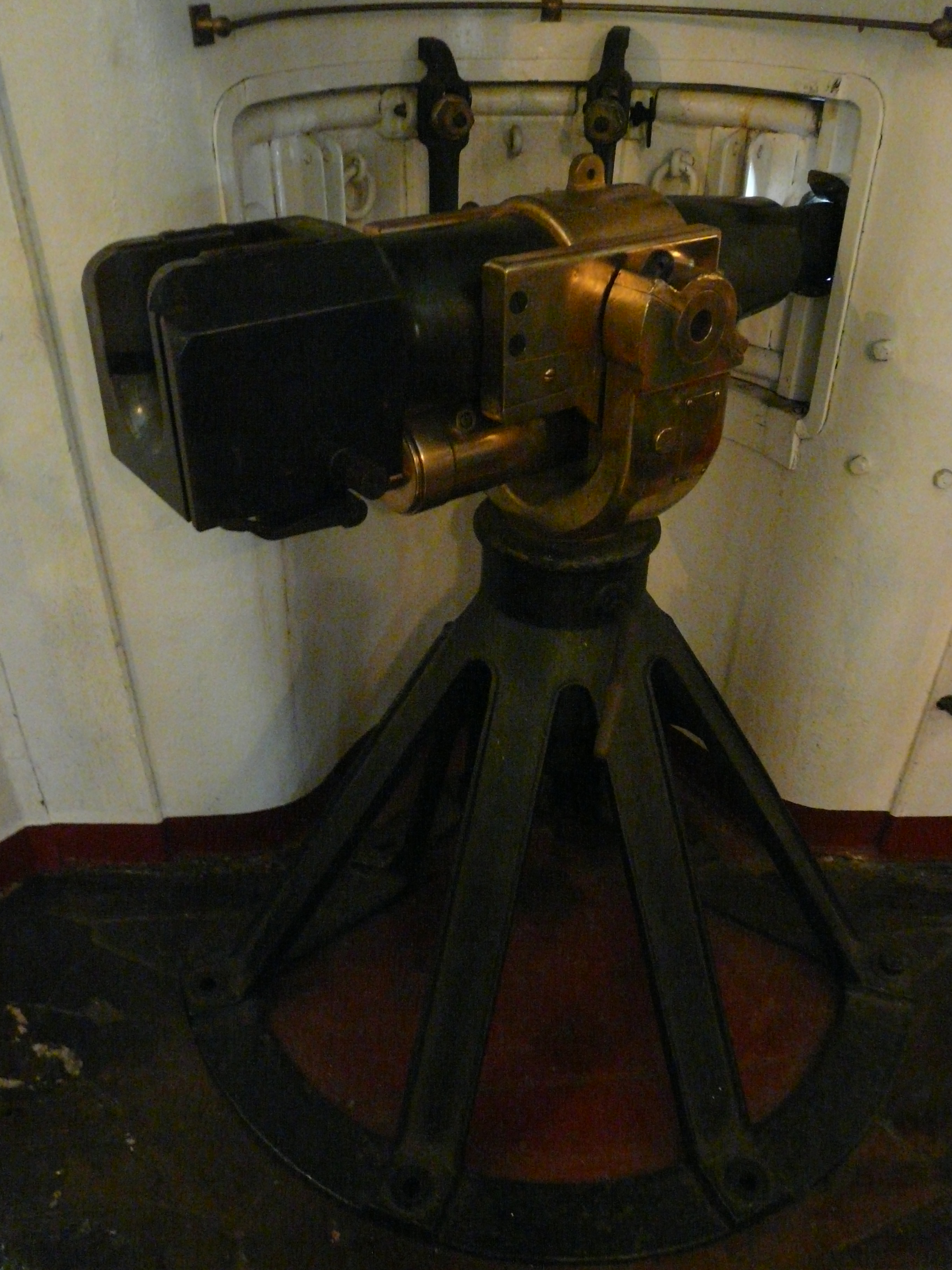
Breech of a Driggs-Schroeder 6-pounder gun on USS Olympia.

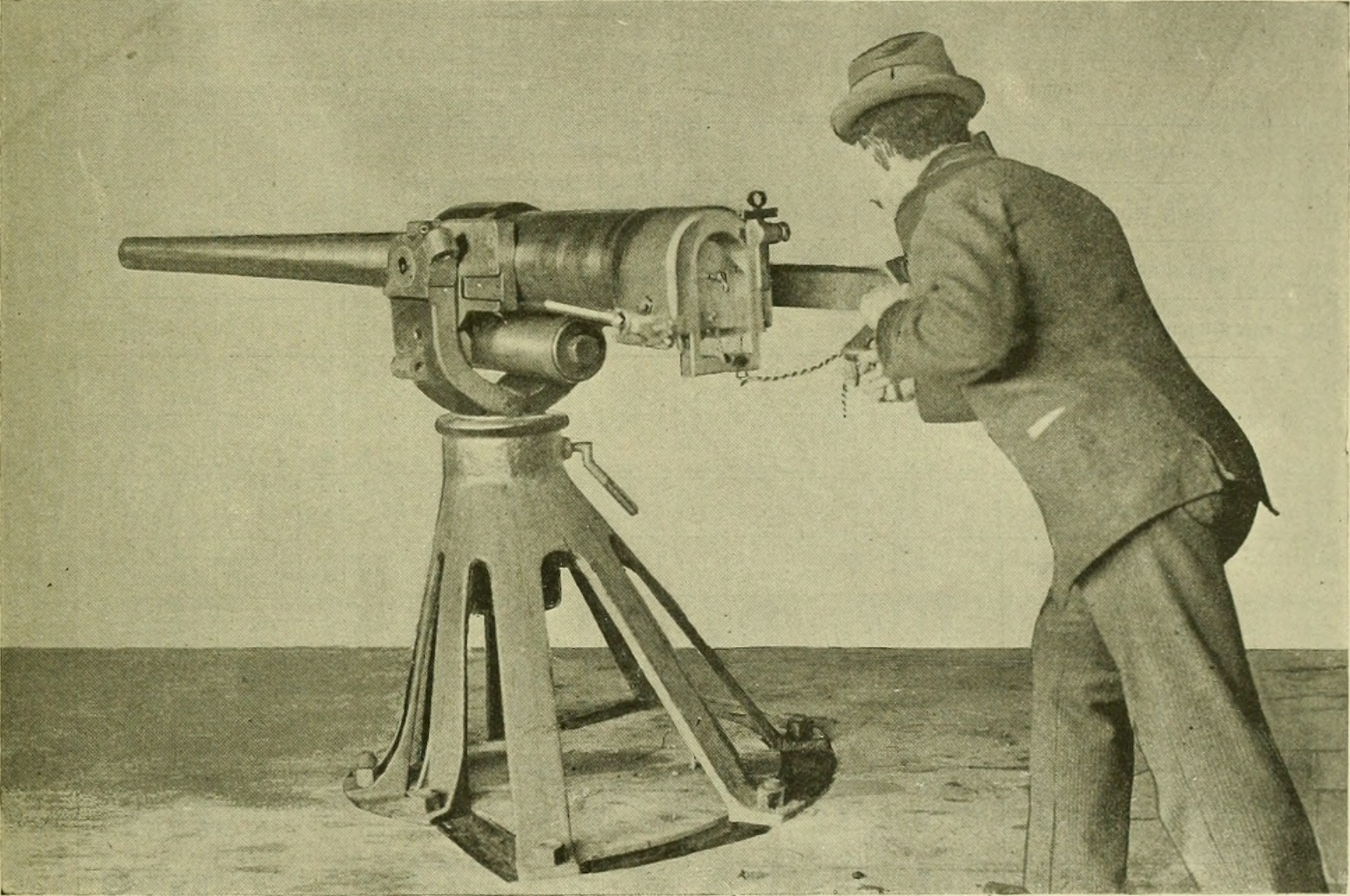
Driggs-Schroeder 6-pounder gun being tested.

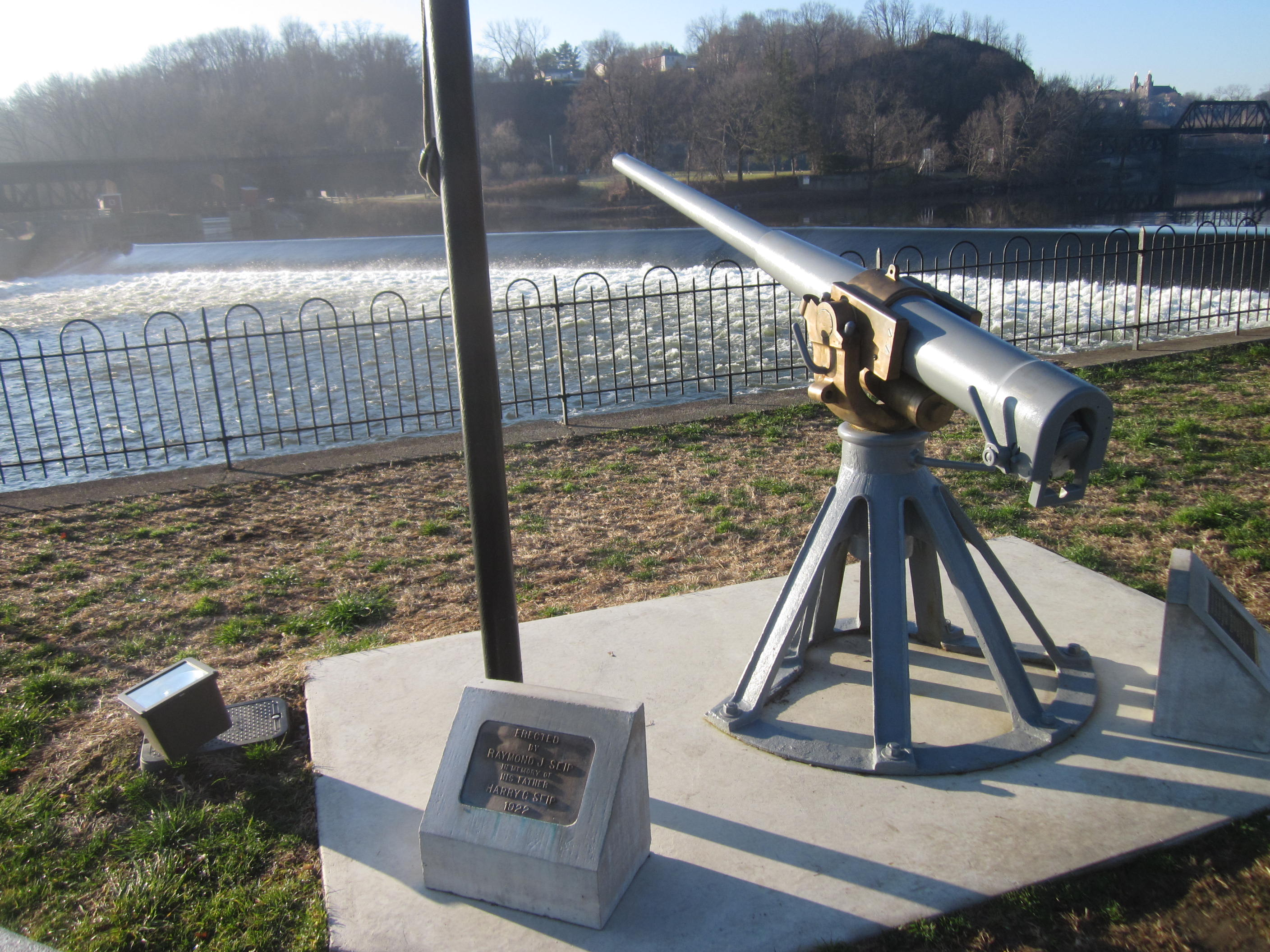
Driggs-Schroeder 6-pounder gun preserved in Easton, Pennsylvania.

Some of the ships equipped with Driggs-Schroeder guns included USS Texas (1892), USS Maine (ACR-1), USS Olympia (C-6), USS New York (ACR-2), and USS Brooklyn (ACR-3). Olympia is preserved with her Driggs-Schroeder 6-pounders intact at the Independence Seaport Museum in Philadelphia, Pennsylvania.

Driggs-Schroeder designed a "limited recoil" carriage for the US Army's 3.2-inch gun M1890, along with a 3.2-inch field gun based on that weapon with a different breech. These were perhaps the same gun and/or carriage later prototyped by Driggs-Seabury; neither was adopted by the US Army.

A 12-pounder gun on a limited recoil carriage for naval landing forces was submitted to the US Army Ordnance Department in fiscal year 1895; it was not adopted.

An Army 4-inch/40 caliber Driggs-Schroeder rapid-fire gun also existed, probably the same as one of several Navy guns of this type. Only four were emplaced by the Army in coast defense mountings; two at Fort Washington, Maryland 1899–1921 and two at Fort Warren, Massachusetts 1899–1925. Driggs-Schroeder designed 6-pounders designated Marks II and III for the Army; they possibly corresponded to the Navy Marks 6 and 8. Some of these weapons were deployed at coastal artillery forts for land defense. These included experimental quantities on "parapet mounts", wheeled carriages with fittings that allowed them to be secured to pintle mounts set in concrete. A dozen were deployed at Fort Ruger in Hawaii as part of the Land Defense Project of 1915, along with some in the Harbor Defenses of Manila and Subic Bays, Philippines.
