= Georges Island (Massachusetts) =

Island in Boston Harbor, Massachusetts

Coordinates: 42°19′10″N 70°55′40″W

Georges Island from the air.

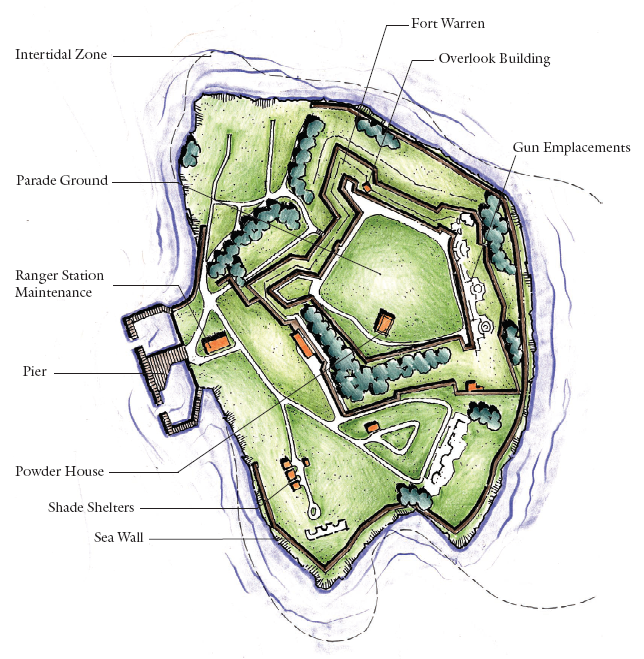
Map of Georges Island.

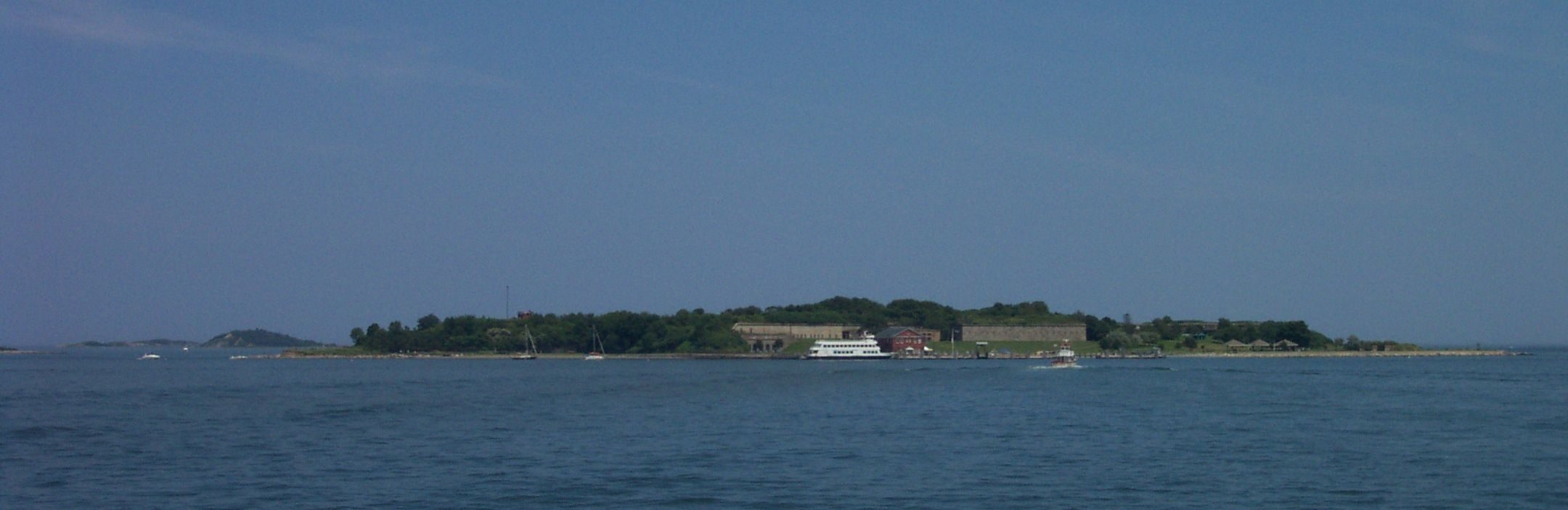
Georges Island from the water.

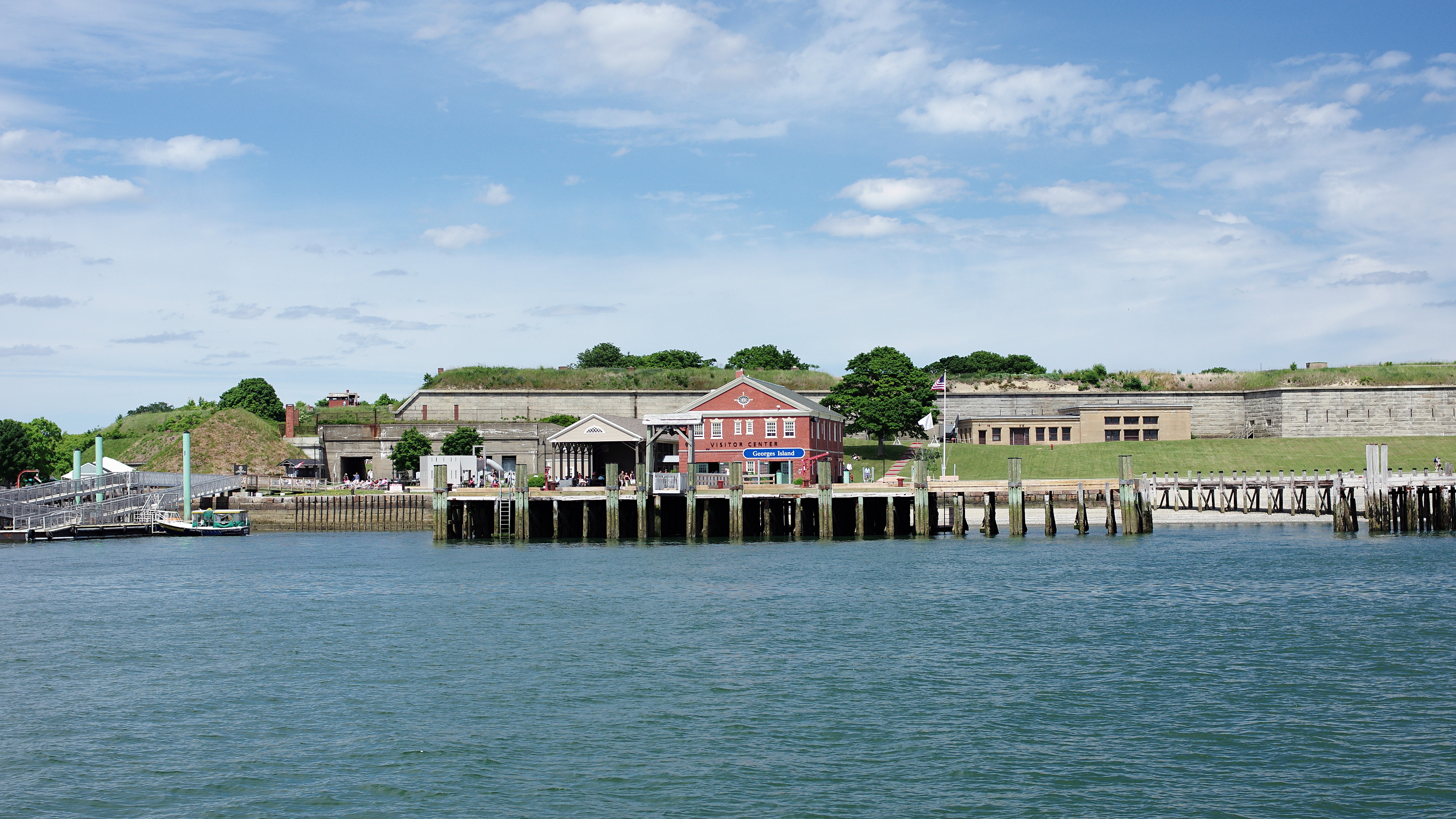
View from the water of the dock, visitor center, and fort entrance.

Georges Island is one of the islands in the Boston Harbor, situated just over 7 miles (11 km) from downtown Boston. The island has a permanent size of 39 acres (160,000 m^{2}), plus an intertidal zone of a further 14 acres (57,000 m^{2}), and rises to a height of 50 feet (15 m) above sea level. Historic Fort Warren is on the island. Because of this, and since a ferry operates from Boston to the island, it is a popular destination and one of the easiest islands to access in the Boston Harbor Islands National Recreation Area.

== History ==
At the time of Euro-American colonization, Georges Island was composed of two drumlins, rising out of the bay like other nearby islands. The island was used for agriculture for 200 years until 1825 when the U.S. government acquired it for coastal defense.

Over the next 20 years the island was dramatically altered, and one of the country's finest forts was built. Dedicated in 1847, Fort Warren's defensive design was virtually obsolete upon completion. However, the fort served as a training ground, patrol point, and Civil War prison that gained a favorable reputation for the humane treatment of its Confederate prisoners. After 100 years of military use, the fort was decommissioned in 1950 and acquired by the Metropolitan District Commission for historic preservation and recreation in 1958.

To this day, in the fort's dark corridors, the legend lives on of "The Lady in Black," the ghost of a Confederate prisoner's wife who is said to have been sentenced to death for aiding in an escape after disguising herself as a male soldier, and hanged in a black robe which was the best the soldiers could do to accommodate her last request of being executed in female clothing. The myth was a creation of author Edward Rowe Snow to bring attention to Fort Warren need for preservation and protection. His efforts through the Friends of Fort Warren were instrumental to Georges Island's inclusion in Massachusetts State Parks and eventually National Park System.

== Present day ==
The island has fields for recreational use, a small food vendor, and twenty one mooring balls available to the public by reservation. It is served throughout the summer and early fall by ferries to and from Boston and by a shuttle boat to and from the surrounding islands during the summer season.

Today the Massachusetts Department of Conservation and Recreation owns and staffs the island. Rangers patrol and give interpretive tours. The island is open to the public May through October. Georges Island is a transportation hub, as inter-island ferries run from Georges to other islands in the park. State laws prohibit alcohol, fireworks, and firearms on the island. Also, the island has a strict carry on–carry off policy for trash.

== Confederate memorial, removed ==
The Commonwealth's only Confederate memorial was installed on the island in 1963 by the Boston Chapter of the United Daughters of the Confederacy. The cenotaph commemorating 13 southern Civil War soldiers, who died while imprisoned at Fort Warren, remained on display until Governor Charlie Baker called for its removal in June 2017. The memorial was subsequently covered over, then removed in October 2017, when it was placed in storage at the Massachusetts Archives.
