= USS Schroeder =

Fletcher-class destroyer

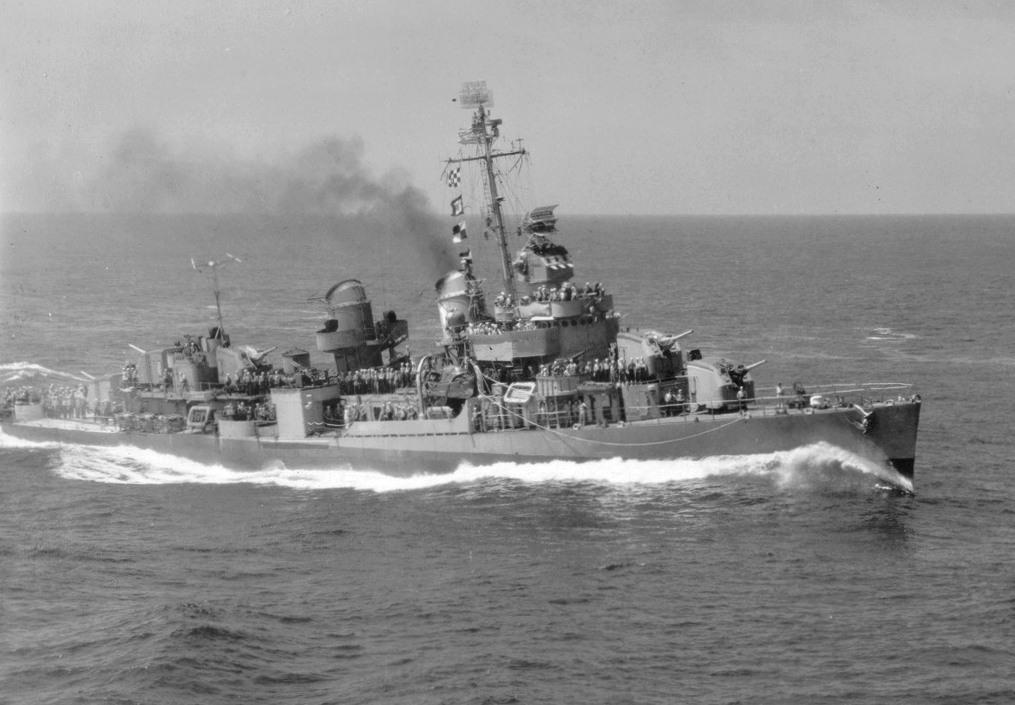
- USS Schroeder in October 1945

History

United States
- Name: Schroeder
- Namesake: Seaton Schroeder
- Builder: Federal Shipbuilding and Drydock Company, Kearny, New Jersey
- Laid down: 25 June 1942
- Launched: 11 November 1942
- Commissioned: 1 January 1943
- Decommissioned: 29 April 1946
- Stricken: 1 October 1972
- Fate: Sold for scrap, 1 January 1974

General characteristics
- Class & type: Fletcher-class destroyer
- Displacement: 2,050 tons
- Length: 376 ft 6 in (114.76 m)
- Beam: 39 ft 8 in (12.09 m)
- Draft: 17 ft 9 in (5.41 m)
- Propulsion: 60,000 shp (45,000 kW); 2 propellers
- Speed: 35 kn (65 km/h; 40 mph)
- Range: 6,500 nmi (12,000 km; 7,500 mi) at 15 kn (28 km/h; 17 mph)
- Complement: 336
- Armament: 5 × single Mk 12 5 in (127 mm)/38 guns; 5 × twin 40 mm (1.6 in) Bofors AA guns; 7 × single 20 mm (0.8 in) Oerlikon AA guns; 2 × quintuple 21 in (533 mm) torpedo tubes; 6 × single depth charge throwers; 2 × depth charge racks

USS Schroeder (DD-501), a Fletcher-class destroyer, was a ship of the United States Navy, named for Rear Admiral Seaton Schroeder (1849–1922). Entering service in 1943, the ship saw action during World War II, participating in the Battle of Tarawa. Following the war the destroyer was placed in reserve, remaining in this state until 1972. She was sold for scrap in 1974.

== Construction and career ==
Schroeder was laid down on 25 June 1942 by the Federal Shipbuilding and Drydock Company Kearny, New Jersey and launched on 11 November 1942, sponsored by Miss Grace Wainwright Schroeder. The destroyer was commissioned on 1 January 1943.

=== 1943 ===
Schroeder provided escort for two separate aircraft carriers making shakedown cruises to the Caribbean and a convoy of merchant ships bound for Casablanca before steaming to the Pacific.

After an overhaul at Mare Island Navy Yard, she steamed west and joined Destroyer Squadron 25 (DesRon 25) at Pearl Harbor on 28 July 1943. Schroeder assisted in screening the carrier task force which attacked Marcus Island on 1 September. While bombarding Wake Island early the next month, she was taken under fire for the first time but suffered no casualties.

After the Wake Island bombardment, Schroeder sailed to the New Hebrides Islands for training with amphibious forces. In early November, she joined the Gilbert Islands invasion force. On the morning of 20 November, Schroeder was in the bombardment group that shelled the eastern coast of Tarawa Atoll. She entered the lagoon early the next morning to provide fire support for the Marines landing on Tarawa. In addition to fire support, the destroyer also acted as a first aid ship for wounded Marines. Schroeder departed Tarawa on 24 November for Pearl Harbor for repairs, as she had damaged her screws on a coral reef in the lagoon.

=== 1944 ===
Schroeder was back with her division, on 1 February 1944, when it screened transports and provided fire support for the assault on Kwajalein Island. She remained in the Marshalls for several weeks and, from 20 to 24 February, bombarded Maloelap and Wotje Atolls. On 1 March, she sailed to the New Hebrides Islands where she participated in more training exercises.

On 20 March, Schroeder and her division bombarded Japanese coast defenses at Kavieng, New Ireland, with nearly 900 rounds of ammunition; departing for Efate in the evening.

Schroeder loaded ammunition at Espiritu Santo and on 1 April, escorted Pocomoke and SS Red Rover to Guadalcanal; joined a merchant convoy there, and escorted it to Milne Bay, New Guinea. Later in the month, she participated in the bombardment of enemy positions at Hollandia; and, then screened transports and LSTs at Humboldt Bay. She performed fighter director duties until 30 April when she departed with a convoy for Cape Sudest and, later, to Buna.

Schroeder operated in the Purvis Bay-Guadalcanal area until she departed for Kwajalein, on 4 June, as a unit of Task Group 53.1 (TG 53.1). The TG was at Eniwetok on 28 June where Schroeder underwent a period of upkeep and logistics.

On 11 July the DD and her division departed for the Mariana Islands. From 16 to 20 July, the division bombarded the Tumon area of Guam. Schroeder then served on picket duty until 4 August when she escorted a convoy back to Eniwetok. After returning to Espiritu Santo for a period of upkeep and logistics, she sailed for Humboldt Bay on 22 August.

Schroeder was assigned to TG 77.5 which sortied, on 13 September, for the invasion of Morotai, Netherlands East Indies. She screened LSTs in their approach to Pitoe Bay and then served on picket duty until departing for Humboldt Bay on 21 September.

The destroyer sailed, on 13 October, with TF 78 for Panoan Island, P.I. She entered Leyte Gulf at midnight, 19 October, with a group of transports, and, the next morning, began performing ASW and fighter director duties. On 25 October, she withdrew from the area and sailed for San Francisco. She arrived there on 23 November and underwent a period of overhaul and availability.

=== 1945 ===
On 11 January 1945, Schroeder moved down the coast to San Diego. Departing there on 20 January, the veteran destroyer was back in Ulithi on 7 February where she joined TF 58, the Fast Carrier Task Force. The task force sortied on 10 February. On 16 and 17 February, the carriers launched attacks against airfields, aircraft factories, and shipping in the Tokyo area. The next day, the flattops launched strikes against the Volcano Islands in preparation for the forthcoming assault against that Japanese bastion.

Schroeder returned to Ulithi in early March, but, by 23 March, was again operating off the Japanese home islands. Detached from the task group on 31 March, she and Murray proceeded to Ulithi. She sailed from there on 10 April as a unit of TG 50.8, which was proceeding to Okinawa to support the landings there. On 16 April, the destroyer, supporting the landing on Ie Shima, was at general quarters nine different times to repel enemy air attacks. Five days later, Schroeder with DesDiv 49, bombarded the western side of Minami Daito Shima. The bombardment caused many fires ashore but brought no return gunfire from the enemy positions.

Schroeder returned to Ulithi, from 27 April to 9 May, for a period of upkeep, replenishment, and recreation. She rejoined the fast carriers three days later as they conducted bombing and photographic missions over Kyūshū. Four days later, they supported the troops on southern Okinawa.

Task Force 58 entered San Pedro Bay, on 13 June for an upkeep period. It sortied on 1 July, and, on 10 July, the carriers launched sustained strikes against Tokyo. On 17–18 July, strikes were launched against targets in the Tokyo-Yokohama area. On 31 July Schroeder shelled Shimizu, Honshū Island.

On 6 September, with hostilities ended, the task force entered Tokyo Bay and dissolved its units. Schroeder was ordered to join TF 11 at Okinawa and proceed to Pearl Harbor. She departed Pearl Harbor on 1 October, with orders assigning her to the east coast. On 2 November 1945, the destroyer entered the Charleston Navy Yard, South Carolina, and prepared for deactivation.

Schroeder was decommissioned on 29 April 1946 and placed in the Atlantic Reserve Fleet. She remained in reserve until 1 October 1972 when she was struck from the Navy List. Schroeder was sold to Southern Materials Co., Ltd., New Orleans, Louisiana, on 1 January 1974.

== Honors ==
Schroeder received 10 battle stars for World War II service.
