= USS Connecticut (BB-18) =

Pre-dreadnought United States battleship

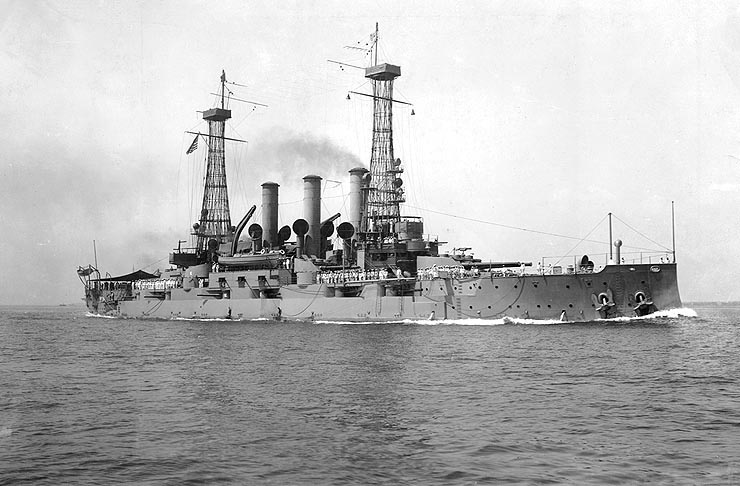
- Connecticut underway sometime before World War I

History

United States
- Name: Connecticut
- Namesake: Connecticut
- Ordered: 1 July 1902
- Builder: New York Navy Yard
- Laid down: 10 March 1903
- Launched: 29 September 1904
- Commissioned: 29 September 1906
- Decommissioned: 1 March 1923
- Stricken: 10 November 1923
- Fate: Sold for scrap, 1 November 1923

General characteristics
- Class & type: Connecticut-class battleship
- Displacement: Normal: 16,000 long tons (16,000 t); Full load: 17,666 long tons (17,949 t)
- Length: 456 ft 4 in (139.09 m)
- Beam: 76 ft 10 in (23.42 m)
- Draft: 24 ft 6 in (7.47 m)
- Installed power: 12 Babcock & Wilcox boilers; 16,500 ihp (12,300 kW)
- Propulsion: 2 × triple-expansion steam engines; 2 × screw propellers
- Speed: 18 kn (21 mph; 33 km/h)
- Complement: 827 officers and men
- Armament: 4 × 12 in (305 mm)/45 caliber Mark 5 guns; 8 × 8 in (203 mm)/45 caliber guns; 12 × 7 in (178 mm)/45 caliber guns; 20 × 3 in (76 mm)/50 caliber guns; 12 × 3-pounder guns; 4 × 1-pounder guns; 4 × 21 inch (533 mm) torpedo tubes
- Armor: Belt: 6–11 in (152–279 mm); Barbettes: 6–10 in (152–254 mm); Turret Main: 8–12 in (203–305 mm); Turret secondary: 7 in (178 mm); Conning tower: 9 in (229 mm)

USS Connecticut (BB-18), the fourth United States Navy ship to be named after the state of Connecticut, was the lead ship of her class of six pre-dreadnought battleships. Her keel was laid on 10 March 1903; launched on 29 September 1904, Connecticut was commissioned on 29 September 1906, as the most advanced ship in the US Navy.

Connecticut served as the flagship for the Jamestown Exposition in mid-1907, which commemorated the 300th anniversary of the founding of the Jamestown colony. She later sailed with the Great White Fleet on a circumnavigation of the Earth to showcase the US Navy's growing fleet of blue-water-capable ships. After completing her service with the Great White Fleet, Connecticut participated in several flag-waving exercises intended to protect American citizens abroad until she was pressed into service as a troop transport at the end of World War I to expedite the return of American Expeditionary Forces from France.

For the remainder of her career, Connecticut sailed to various places in both the Atlantic and Pacific while training newer recruits to the Navy. However, the provisions of the 1922 Washington Naval Treaty stipulated that many of the older battleships, Connecticut among them, would have to be disposed of, so she was decommissioned on 1 March 1923, and sold for scrap on 1 November 1923.

== Design ==
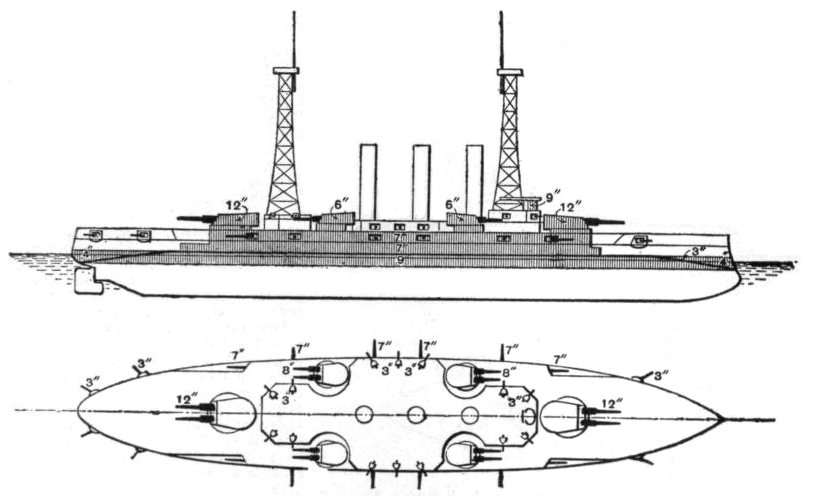
Plan and profile drawing showing the arrangement of the guns and armor

Connecticut was 456.3 ft (139.1 m) long overall and had a beam of 76.9 ft (23.4 m) and a draft of 24.5 ft (7.5 m). She displaced 16,000 long tons (16,260 t) as designed and up to 17,666 long tons (17,949 t) at full load. The ship was powered by two-shaft triple-expansion steam engines rated at 16,500 indicated horsepower (12,300 kW), with steam provided by twelve coal-fired Babcock & Wilcox boilers ducted into three funnels. The propulsion system generated a top speed of 18 knots (33 km/h; 21 mph). As built, she was fitted with heavy military masts, but these were quickly replaced by lattice masts in 1909. She had a crew of 827 officers and men, increased to 881 and later to 896.

The ship was armed with a main battery of four 12 inch /45 Mark 5 (Note: /45 refers to the length of the gun in terms of calibers. A /45 gun is 45 times long as it is in bore diameter.) guns in two twin gun turrets on the centerline, one forward and aft. The secondary battery consisted of eight 8-inch (203 mm) /45 guns and twelve 7-inch (178 mm) /45 guns. The 8-inch guns were mounted in four twin turrets amidships and the 7-inch guns were placed in casemates in the hull. For close-range defense against torpedo boats, she carried twenty 3-inch (76 mm) /50 guns mounted in casemates along the side of the hull and twelve 3-pounder guns. She also carried four 37 mm (1.5 in) 1-pounder guns. As was standard for capital ships of the period, Connecticut carried four 21 inch (533 mm) torpedo tubes, submerged in her hull on the broadside.

Connecticut's main armored belt was 11 in (279 mm) thick over the magazines and the propulsion machinery spaces and 6 in (152 mm) elsewhere. The main battery gun turrets had 12-inch (305 mm) thick faces, and the supporting barbettes had 10 in (254 mm) of armor plating. The secondary turrets had 7 in (178 mm) of frontal armor. The conning tower had 9 in (229 mm) thick sides.

== Service history ==
=== Construction ===
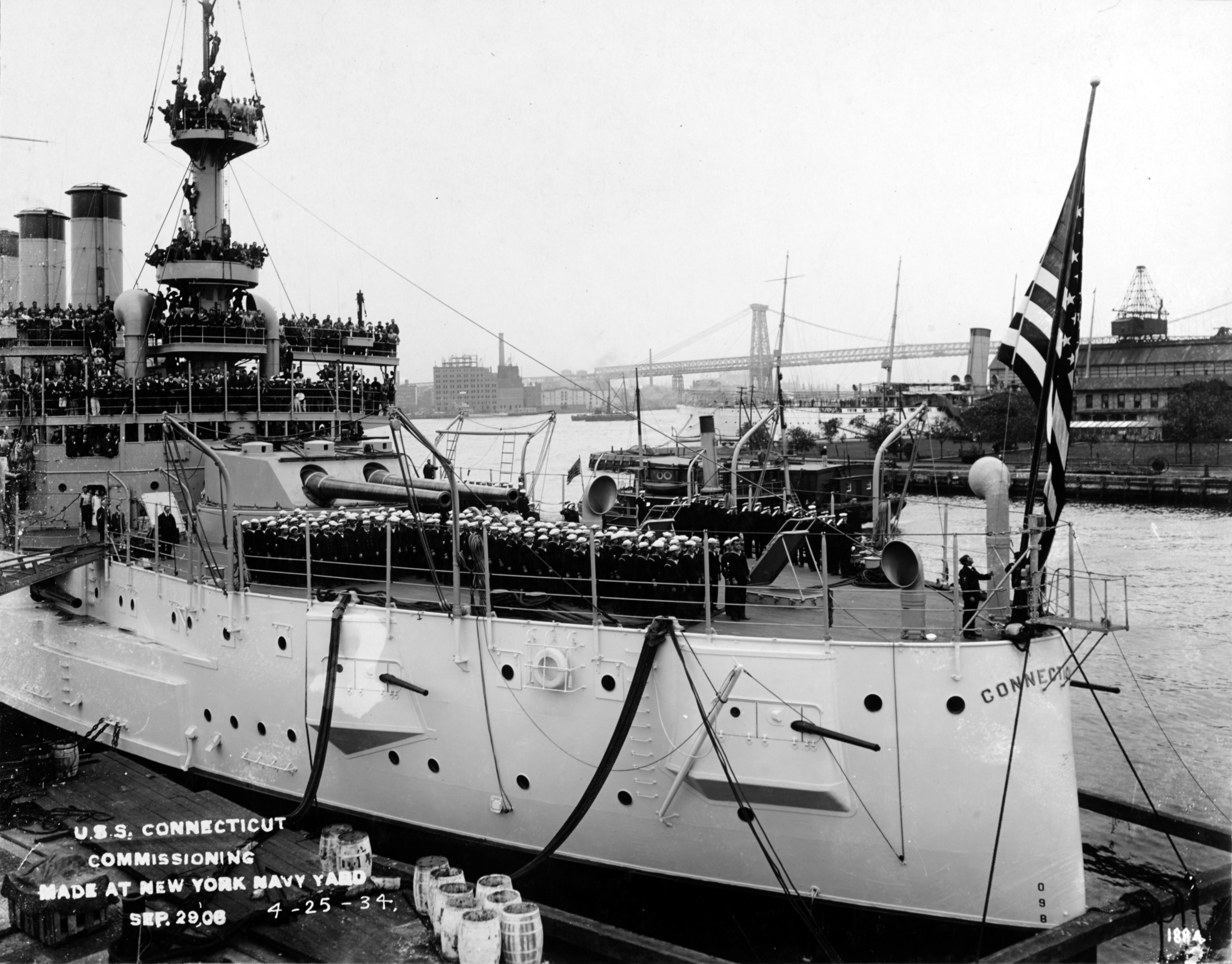
Commissioning ceremonies for Connecticut, 29 September 1906

Connecticut was ordered on 1 July 1902. On 15 October 1902, she was awarded to the New York Naval Shipyard. She was laid down on 10 March 1903, and launched on 29 September 1904. She was sponsored by Miss Alice B. Welles, granddaughter of Gideon Welles, Secretary of the Navy during the American Civil War. A crowd of over 30,000 people attended the launch, as did many of the Navy's ships. The battleships Texas, Massachusetts, Iowa, Kearsarge, Illinois, Alabama, Maine, and Missouri were at the ceremony, along with the protected cruisers Columbia and Minneapolis and the auxiliary cruiser Prairie.

Three attempts to sabotage the ship were discovered in 1904. On 31 March, rivets on the keel plates were found bored through. On 14 September, a 1 3/8 in (35 mm) bolt was found driven into the launching way, where it protruded some 5 in (130 mm). Shortly after Connecticut was launched on 29 September, a 1 in (25 mm) diameter hole was discovered drilled through a 5/8 in (16 mm) steel keel plate. (Note: It was estimated that drilling the hole would have taken 20 minutes. See: "Armed tug last night guarded new warship" (PDF). The New York Times. 3 October 1904. p. 1.) The ship's watertight compartments and pumps prevented her from sinking, and all damage was repaired. The incidents prompted the Navy to post armed guards at the shipyard, and an overnight watch was kept by a Navy tug manned by Marines who had orders to shoot to kill any unauthorized person attempting to approach the ship.

As Connecticut was only 55% complete when she was launched, missing most of her upper works, protection, machinery and armament, it was two years before Connecticut was commissioned on 29 September 1906. Captain William Swift was the first captain of the new battleship. Connecticut sailed out of New York for the first time on 15 December 1906, becoming the first ship in the US Navy to ever go to sea without a sea trial. She first journeyed south to the Virginia Capes, where she conducted a variety of training exercises; this was followed by a shakedown cruise and battle practice off Cuba and Puerto Rico. During the cruise, she participated in a search for the missing steamer Ponce. (Note: Ponce was eventually found and towed back to port by a German freighter; the seven passengers were taken off by the Quebec liner Bermudian. See: "Ponce's passengers return" (PDF). The New York Times. 20 January 1907. p. 12.)

On 13 January 1907, Connecticut ran onto a reef while entering the harbor at Culebra Island. The Navy did not release any information about the grounding until press dispatches from San Juan, carrying news of the incident reached the mainland on 23 January. Even then, Navy authorities in San Juan claimed to be ignorant of the situation, and, that same day, the Navy Department itself said that they only knew that Captain Swift thought she had touched bottom and that an examination of the ship's bottom by divers had revealed no damage. The Navy amended this the next day, releasing a statement that Connecticut had been only slightly damaged and had returned to her shakedown cruise. However, damage to the ship was much more serious than the Navy admitted; in contrast to an official statement saying that Connecticut had only "touched" the rocks, she actually had run full upon the reef when traversing "a course well marked with buoys" in "broad daylight" and did enough damage to probably require a dry docking. This apparent attempt at a cover-up was enough for the United States Congress to consider an official inquiry into the matter.

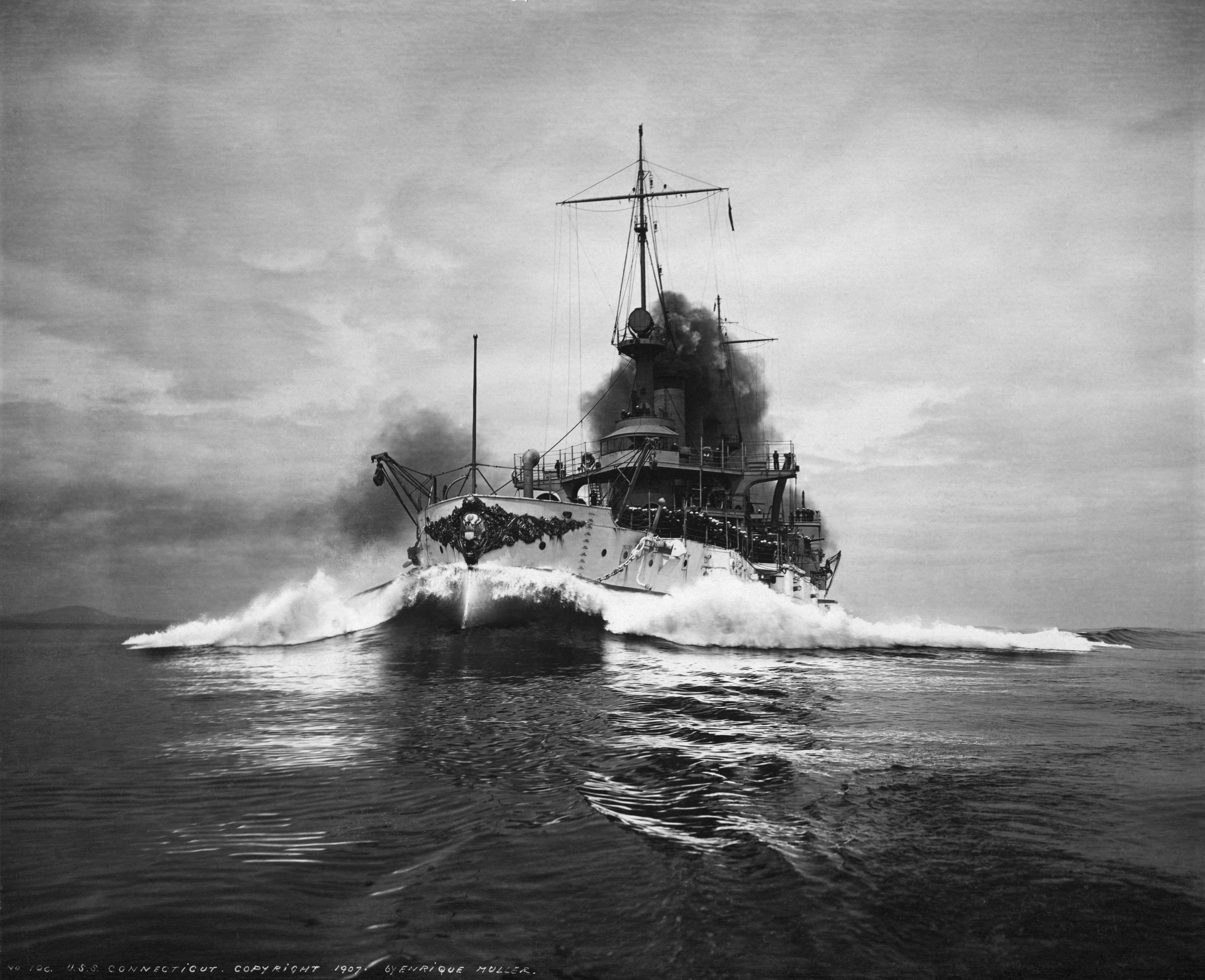
Connecticut on her speed trials in 1906 or 1907. The boat from which this photo was taken is about to be swamped by the bow wave emanating from the battleship.

On 21 March, the Navy announced that Swift would be court-martialed for "through negligence, causing a vessel to run upon a rock" and "neglect of duty in regard to the above". Along with the officer of the deck at the time of the accident, Lieutenant Harry E. Yarnell, Swift faced a court martial of seven rear admirals, a captain, and a lieutenant. He was sentenced to one year's suspension from duty, later reduced to nine months; after about six months, the sentence was remitted on 24 October. However, he was not assigned command of another ship.

Connecticut steamed back to Hampton Roads after this, arriving on 16 April; when she arrived, Rear Admiral Robley D. Evans, commander of the Atlantic Fleet, transferred his flag from Maine to Connecticut, making her the flagship of the fleet. President Theodore Roosevelt opened the Jamestown Exposition on 25 April, and Connecticut was named as the official host of the vessels that were visiting from other countries. Sailors and marines from the ship took part in various events ashore, and foreign dignitaries, along with the governors of Virginia and Rhode Island, were hosted aboard the ship on 29 April. Evans closed the Exposition on 4 May, on the quarterdeck of Connecticut. On 10 June, Connecticut joined in the Presidential Fleet Review; she left three days later for an overhaul in the New York Naval Yard. After the overhaul, Connecticut conducted maneuvers off Hampton Roads, and target practice off Cape Cod. She was ordered back to the New York Naval Yard, once again on 6 September, for a refit that would make her suitable for use as flagship of the Great White Fleet.

=== Flagship of the Great White Fleet ===
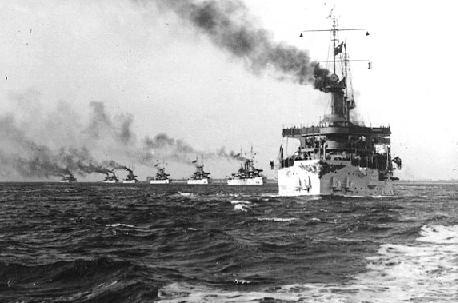
Connecticut leads the way for the Great White Fleet in 1907

The cruise of the Great White Fleet was conceived as a way to demonstrate American military power, particularly to Japan. Tensions had begun to rise between the United States and Japan after the latter's victory in the Russo-Japanese War in 1905, particularly over racist opposition to Japanese immigration to the United States. The press in both countries began to call for war, and Roosevelt hoped to use the demonstration of naval might to deter Japanese aggression. Connecticut left the New York Naval Yard, on 5 December 1907, and arrived the next day in Hampton Roads, where the Great White Fleet would assemble with her as their flagship. After an eight-day period known as "Navy Farewell Week" during which festivities were held for the departing sailors, and all 16 battleships took on full loads of coal, stores, and ammunition, the ships were ready to depart. The battleship captains paid their respects to President Theodore Roosevelt on the presidential yacht Mayflower, and all the ships weighed anchor and departed at 1000. They passed in review before the President, and then began traveling south.

After steaming past Cape Hatteras, the fleet headed for the Caribbean. They approached Puerto Rico, on 20 December, caught sight of Venezuela on 22 December, and later dropped anchor in Port of Spain, the capital of Trinidad, making the first port visit of the Great White Fleet. With the torpedo boat flotilla that had left Hampton Roads, two weeks previously, and five colliers to fill the coal bunkers of the fleet, Port of Spain had a total of 32 US Navy ships in the harbor, making it "[resemble] a US Navy base".

After spending Christmas in Trinidad, the ships departed for Rio de Janeiro, on 29 December. A ceremonial Brazilian escort of three cruisers met the task force 12 nmi (14 mi; 22 km) outside Rio, and "thousands of wildly cheering Brazilians lined the shore"; 10 days of ceremonies, games, and festivities followed, and the stopover was so successful that the visit was the cause of a major boost in US–Brazilian relations. The fleet left Rio on 22 January 1908, still heading south, this time bound for the coaling stop of Punta Arenas, Chile.

Four cruisers from Argentina, San Martin, Buenos Ayres, 9 De Julio, and Pueyrredon, all under the command of Admiral Hipolito Oliva, sailed 300 nmi (350 mi; 560 km) to salute the American ships on their way to Chile. The fleet arrived at Punta Arenas, on 1 February, and spent five days in the town of 14,000. Heading north, they followed the coastline of Chile, passing in review of Chilean President Pedro Montt on 14 February, outside Valparaíso, and they were escorted to Callao, in Peru, by the cruiser Coronel Bolognesi on 19 and 20 February. Peru's president, José Pardo, came aboard Connecticut during this time, as Rear Admiral Evans was quite ill and could not go ashore. After taking on coal, the ships steamed for Mexico on 29 February, passing in review of Pardo on board the cruiser Almirante Grau before leaving.

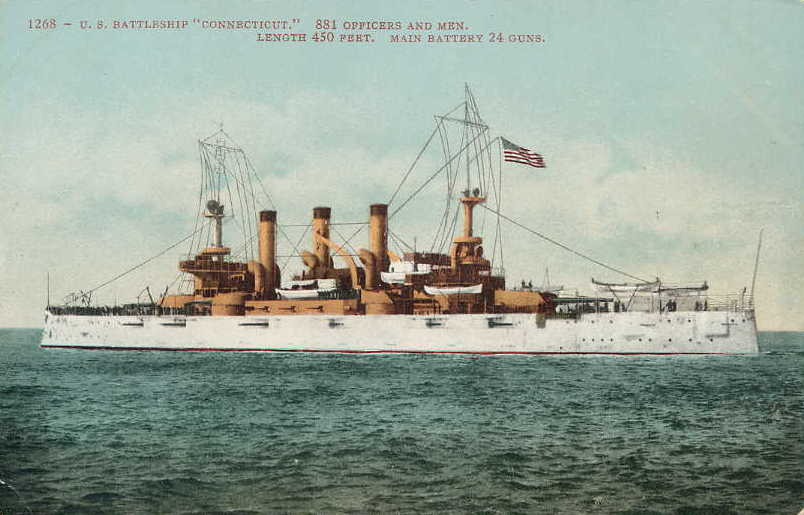
Postcard of the ship published in San Francisco

Arriving in Mexico, on 20 March, the fleet underwent three weeks of target practice. Rear Admiral Evans was relieved of command during this time, as he was completely bedridden and in constant pain. To get him medical attention, Connecticut set sail north at full speed on 30 March. She was met two days later by the schooner Yankton, which took the admiral to a hospital. Connecticut traveled back south to rejoin the fleet, and Rear Admiral Charles M. Thomas took Evans's place on Connecticut as the commander of the fleet, which continued its journey north towards California.

On 5 May, Evans returned to Connecticut in time for the fleet's sailing through the Golden Gate on 6 May, although he was still in pain. Over one million people watched the 42-ship fleet sail into the bay. (Note: The Great White Fleet was joined by various Pacific Fleet warships and a torpedo boat flotilla for their entrance into the harbor, making the conglomerate of ships the "most powerful concentration of naval might yet gathered in the Western Hemisphere". See: Albertson (2007), p. 47.) After a grand parade through San Francisco, a review of the fleet by Secretary of the Navy Victor H. Metcalf, a gala reception, and a farewell address from Evans (who was retiring due to his illness and his age), the fleet left San Francisco, for Seattle, with Rear Admiral Charles Stillman Sperry as commander. The ships all underwent refits before the next leg of the voyage. The fleet left the West Coast again on 7 July, bound for Hawaii, which it reached on 16 July.

Leaving Hawaii, on 22 July, the ships next stopped at Auckland, Sydney, and Melbourne. High seas and winds hampered the ships for part of the voyage to New Zealand, but they arrived on 9 August; festivities, parades, balls, and games were staples of the visits to each city. The highlight of the austral visit was a parade of 12,000 US Navy, Royal Navy, and Commonwealth naval and military personnel in front of 250,000 people.

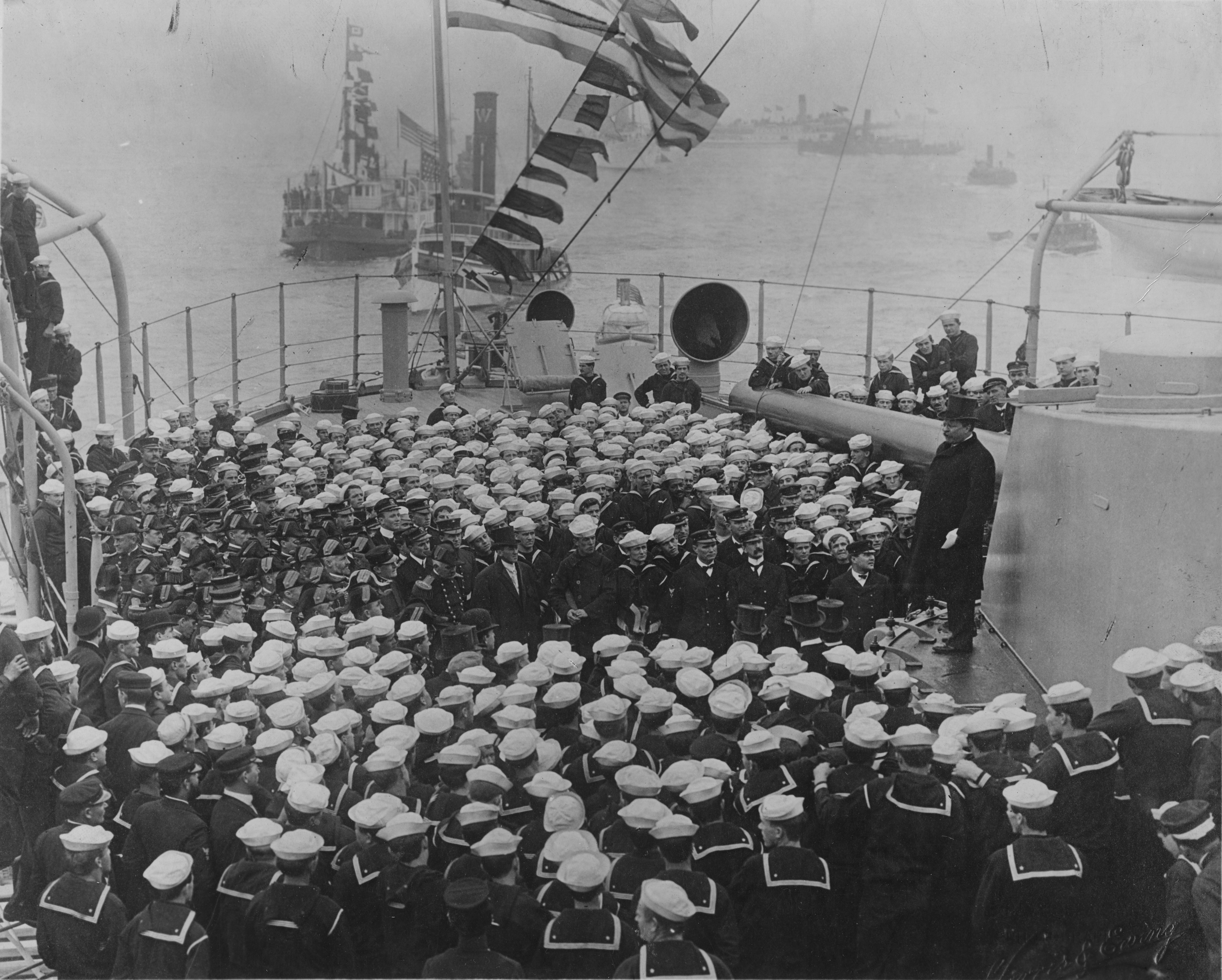
Theodore Roosevelt (on the 12-inch gun turret at right) addresses the crew of Connecticut.

After stopping at Manila, in the Philippines, the fleet set course for Yokohama, Japan. They encountered a typhoon on the way on 12 October, but no ships were lost; the fleet was only delayed 24 hours. After three Japanese warships and six merchantmen escorted the Americans in, festivities began. The celebrations culminated in the Uraga, where Commodore Matthew C. Perry had anchored a little more than 50 years prior. The ships then departed on 25 October. After three weeks of exercises in the Philippines' Subic Bay, the ships sailed south on 1 December, for Singapore; they did not stop there, however, passing outside the city on 6 December. Continuing on, they stopped at Colombo, for coal from 12 to 20 December, before sailing on for the Suez Canal. It took three days for all 16 battleships to traverse the canal, even though it was closed to all other traffic. They then headed for a coaling stop at Port Said, Egypt, after which the fleet split up into individual divisions to call on different ports in the Mediterranean. The First Division, of which Connecticut was a part, originally planned to visit Italy, before moving on to Villefranche, but Connecticut and Illinois were quickly dispatched to southern Italy, on a humanitarian mission when news of the 1908 Messina earthquake reached the fleet. Seamen from the ships helped clear debris and unload supplies from the US Navy refrigerated supply ship Culgoa; Admiral Sperry received the personal thanks of King Victor Emmanuel III for their assistance.

After port calls were concluded, the ships headed for Gibraltar, where they found a conglomerate of warships from many different nations awaiting them "with decks manned and horns blaring": the battleships HMS Albemarle and Albion with the cruiser HMS Devonshire and the Second Cruiser Squadron represented Great Britain's Royal Navy, battleships Tsesarevich and Slava with cruisers Admiral Makarov, Bogatyr and Oleg represented the Imperial Russian Navy, and various gunboats represented France and the Netherlands. After coaling for five days, the ships got under way and left for home on 6 February 1909.

After weathering a few storms, the ships met nine of their fellow US Navy ships five days out of Hampton Roads: four battleships (Maine, Mississippi, Idaho, and New Hampshire—the latter being the only sister of Connecticut to not make the cruise), two armored cruisers, and three scout cruisers. Connecticut then led all of these warships around Tail-of-the-Horseshoe Lightship on 22 February to pass in review of President Roosevelt, who was then on the presidential yacht anchored off Old Point Comfort, ending a 46,729 nmi (53,775 mi; 86,542 km) trip. Roosevelt boarded the ship after she anchored and gave a short speech, saying, "You've done the trick. Other nations may do as you have done, but they'll follow you."

=== Pre-World War I ===
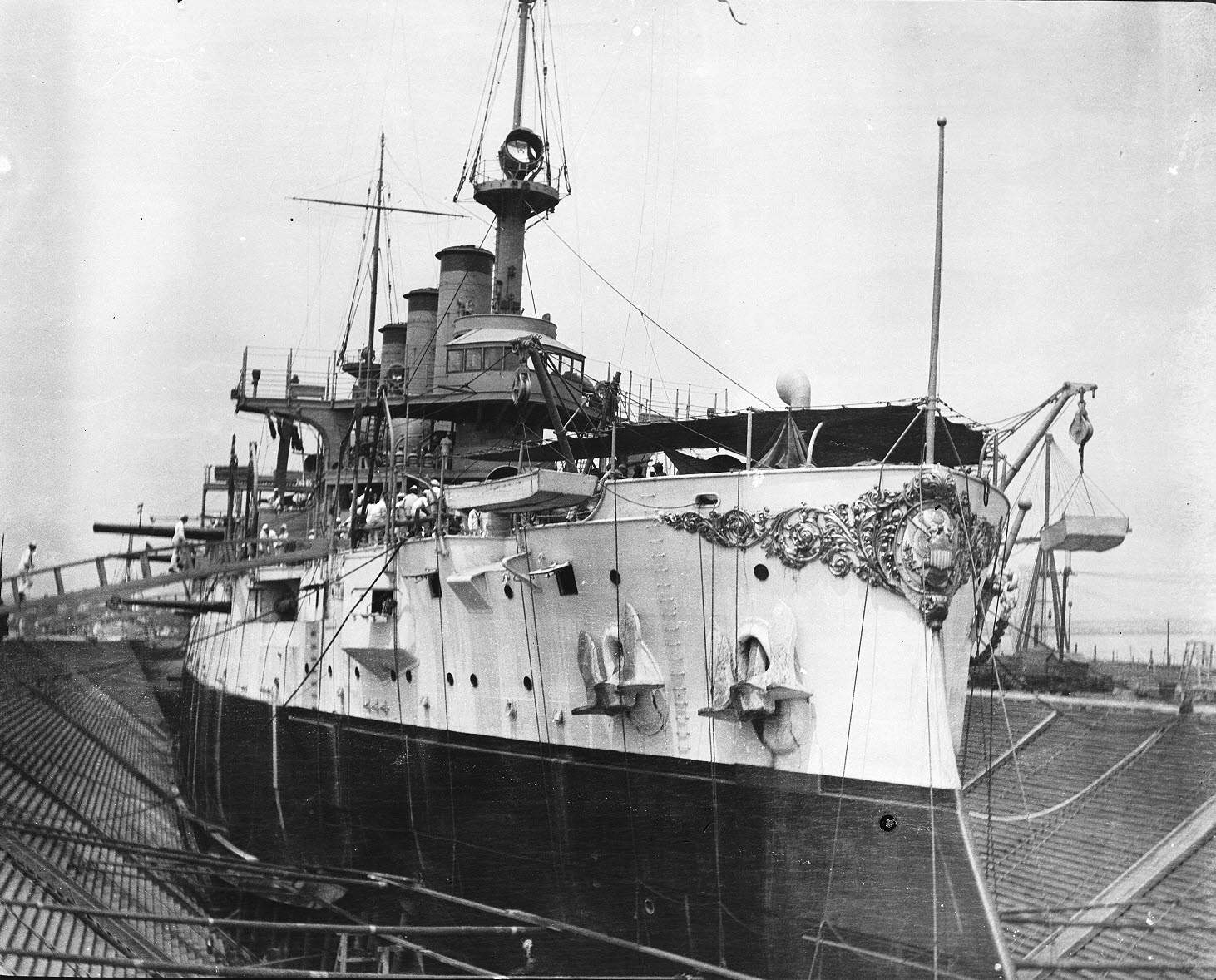
Connecticut in dry dock at the Brooklyn Naval Yard after the world cruise in March 1909

Following her return from the world cruise, Connecticut continued to serve as flagship of the Atlantic Fleet, interrupted only by a March 1909 overhaul at the New York Navy Yard. After rejoining the fleet, she cruised the East Coast from her base at Norfolk, Virginia. For the rest of 1909, the battleship conducted training and participated in ceremonial observances, such as the Hudson–Fulton Celebration. In early January 1910, Connecticut left for Cuban waters and stayed there until late March when she returned to New York for a refit. After several months conducting maneuvers and battle practice off the New England coast, she left for Europe on 2 November to go on a midshipman training cruise. She arrived in Portland, England on 15 November and was present during the 1 December birthday celebration of Queen Alexandra, the queen mother. Connecticut next visited Cherbourg, France, where she welcomed visitors from the town and also hosted commander-in-chief of the French Navy Vice-Amiral Laurent Marin-Darbel, and a delegation of his officers. While there, a boat crew from Connecticut engaged a crew from the French battleship Charles Martel in a rowing race; Connecticut's crew won by twelve lengths. Connecticut departed French waters for Guantánamo Bay, Cuba, on 30 December, and stayed there until 17 March, when she departed for Hampton Roads.

Connecticut was the leader of the ships that passed in review during the Presidential Fleet Review in New York, on 2 November; she then remained in New York, until 12 January 1912, when she returned to Guantánamo Bay. During a March overhaul at the Philadelphia Naval Yard, the battleship relinquished her role as flagship to the armored cruiser Washington. After the overhaul's completion, Connecticut's activities through the end of 1912 included practicing with torpedoes in Fort Pond Bay, conducting fleet maneuvers, and battle practice off Block Island and the Virginia Capes. Stopping in New York, Connecticut conducted training exercises in Guantánamo Bay from 13 February to 20 March; during this time (on the 28th), she once again became the Atlantic Fleet flagship for a brief and final time when she served in the interim as Rear Admiral Charles J. Badger transferred his flag from Wyoming to Utah. After taking on stores in Philadelphia, Connecticut sailed for Mexico and arrived on 22 April; she was to patrol the waters near Tampico and Vera Cruz, protecting American citizens and interests during disturbances there and in Haiti.

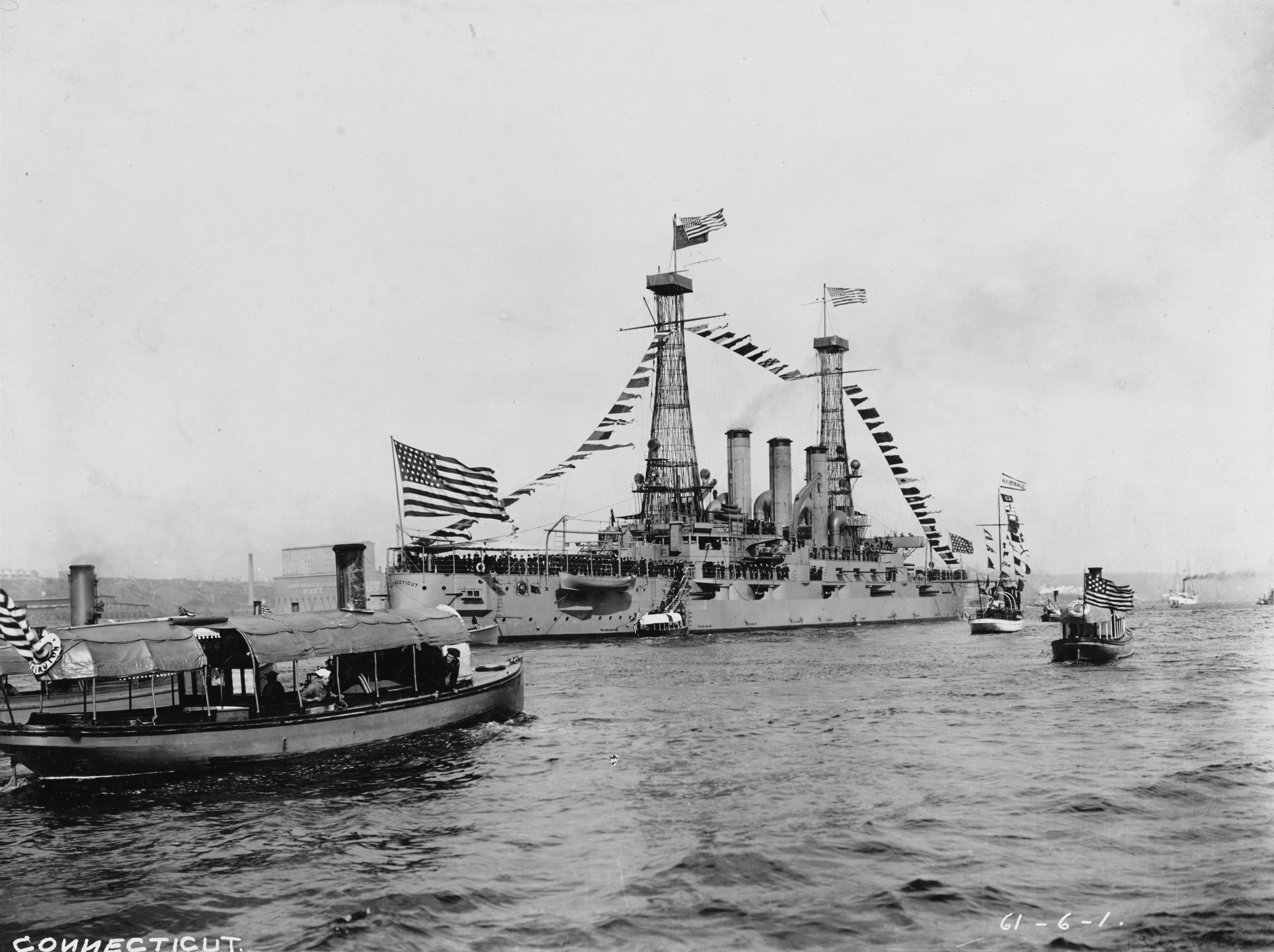
Connecticut saluting the presidential yacht Mayflower during the Presidential Fleet Review in 1911

On 22 June 1912, Connecticut departed Mexican waters for Philadelphia, where she was dry docked for three months of repairs. Upon their completion, Connecticut conducted gunnery practice off the Virginia Capes. On 23 October, Connecticut became the flagship of the Fourth Battleship Division. After the division passed in review before Secretary of the Navy George von Lengerke Meyer on the 25th, Connecticut left for Genoa, Italy, where she remained until 30 November. The battleship departed Italy for Vera Cruz and arrived on 23 December. She took refugees from Mexico to Galveston and carried officers of the Army and representative from the Red Cross back in the opposite direction.

On 29 May 1914, while still in Mexico, Connecticut relinquished the duty of flagship to Minnesota, but remained in Mexico, until 2 July, when she left for Havana. Arriving there on 8 July, Connecticut embarked Madison R. Smith, the US minister to Haiti, and took him to Port-au-Prince, arriving five days later. Connecticut remained in Haiti for a month, then left for Philadelphia on 8 August and arrived there on 14 August.

Connecticut then went to Maine and the Virginia Capes, for battle practice, after which she went into the Philadelphia Naval Yard for an overhaul. After more than 15 weeks, Connecticut emerged on 15 January 1915, and steamed south to Cuba, where she conducted training exercises. During maneuvers there in March 1915, a chain wrapped around her starboard propeller, breaking the shaft and forcing her return to Philadelphia, for repairs. She remained there until 31 July, when she embarked 433 men from the Second Regiment, First Brigade, of the United States Marine Corps for transport to Port-au-Prince, where they were put ashore on 5 August, as part of the US occupation of Haiti. Connecticut delivered supplies to amphibious troops in Cap-Haïtien, on 5 September and remained near Haiti, for the next few months, supporting landing parties ashore, including detachments of Marines and sailors from Connecticut under the command of Major Smedley Butler. After departing Haiti, Connecticut arrived in Philadelphia, on 15 December, and was placed into the Atlantic Reserve Fleet.

=== World War I ===
As part of the US response to Germany's unrestricted submarine warfare, Connecticut was recommissioned on 3 October 1916. Two days later, Admiral Herbert O. Dunn made her the flagship of the Fifth Battleship Division, transferring his flag from Minnesota. Connecticut operated along the East Coast and in the Caribbean until the United States entered World War I on 6 April 1917. For the duration of the war, Connecticut was based in York River, Virginia. More than 1,000 trainees—midshipmen and gun crews for merchant ships—took part in exercises on her while she sailed in Chesapeake Bay, and off the Virginia Capes.

=== Inter-war period ===
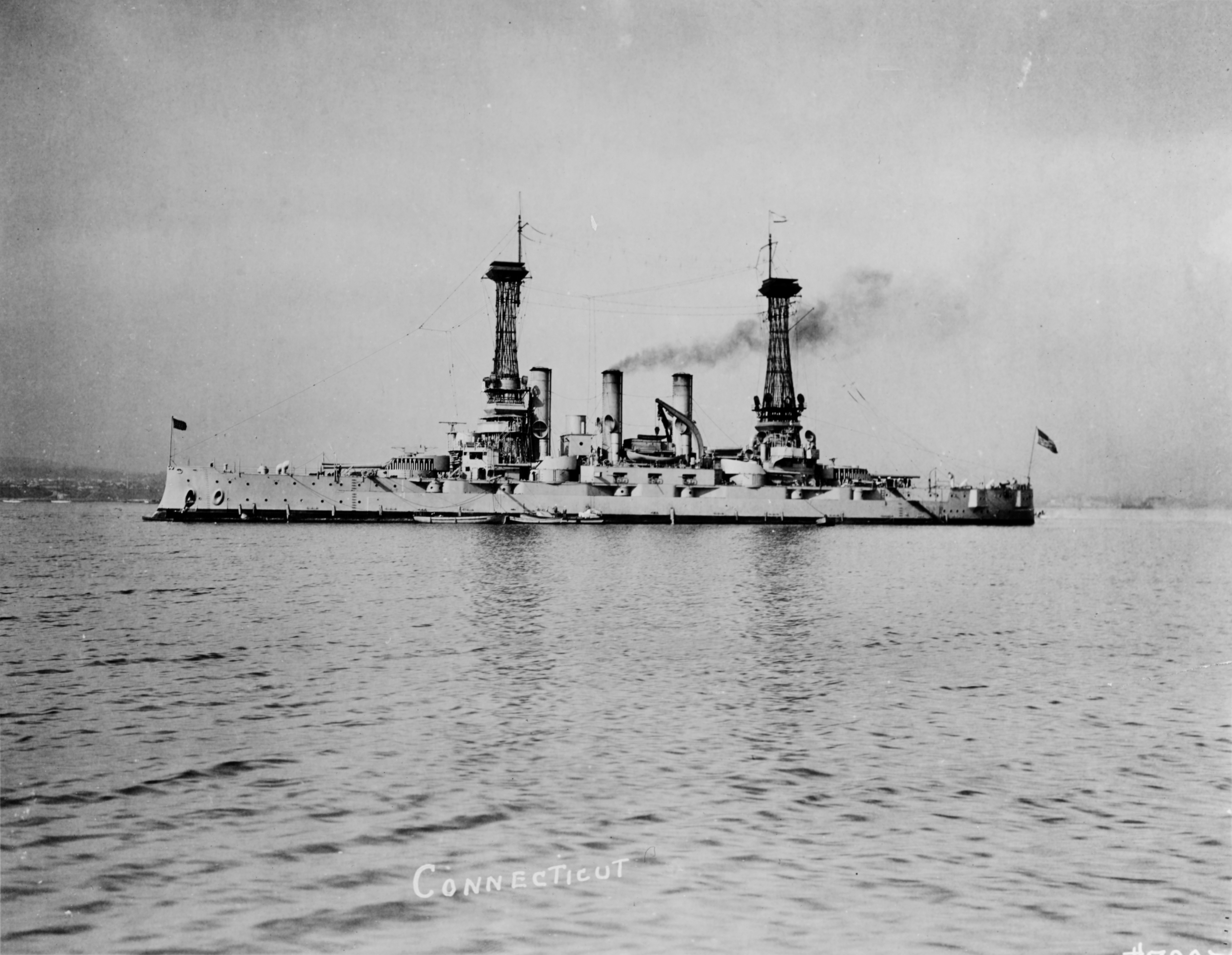
Connecticut photographed in 1920

At the close of the war, Connecticut was assigned to the Cruiser and Transport Force for transport duty, and from 6 January – 22 June 1919, she made four voyages to return troops from France. On 6 January, she left Hampton Roads, for Brest, France, where she embarked 1,000 troops. After bringing them to New York, arriving on 2 February, Connecticut traveled back to Brest, and picked up the 53rd Pioneer Regiment, a company of Marines, and a company of military police, 1,240 troops in all. These men were delivered to Hampton Roads, on 24 March. After two months, Connecticut made another run overseas: following a short period of liberty in Paris, for her crew, she embarked 891 men variously from the 502nd Army Engineers, a medical detachment, and the Red Cross. They were dropped off in Newport News, on 22 June. On 23 June 1919, after having returned over 4,800 men, Connecticut was reassigned as flagship of the Second Battleship Squadron of the Atlantic Fleet, under the command of Vice Admiral Hilary P. Jones.

While based in Philadelphia, for the next 11 months, Connecticut trained midshipmen. On 2 May 1920, 200 midshipmen boarded the ship for a training cruise. In company with the other battleships of her squadron, Connecticut sailed to the Caribbean, and through the Panama Canal, in order to visit four ports-of-call: Honolulu, Seattle, San Francisco, and San Pedro Bay (Los Angeles and Long Beach). After visiting all four, the squadron made their way back through the canal and headed for home. However, the port engine of Connecticut gave out three days after transiting the canal, requiring New Hampshire to tow the battleship into Guantánamo Bay. The pair arrived on 28 August. The midshipmen were debarked there, and Vice Admiral Jones transferred his flag from Connecticut to his new flagship, Kansas. The Navy repair ship Prometheus was dispatched from New York on 1 September to tow Connecticut to Philadelphia; they arrived at the Navy Yard there on 11 September.

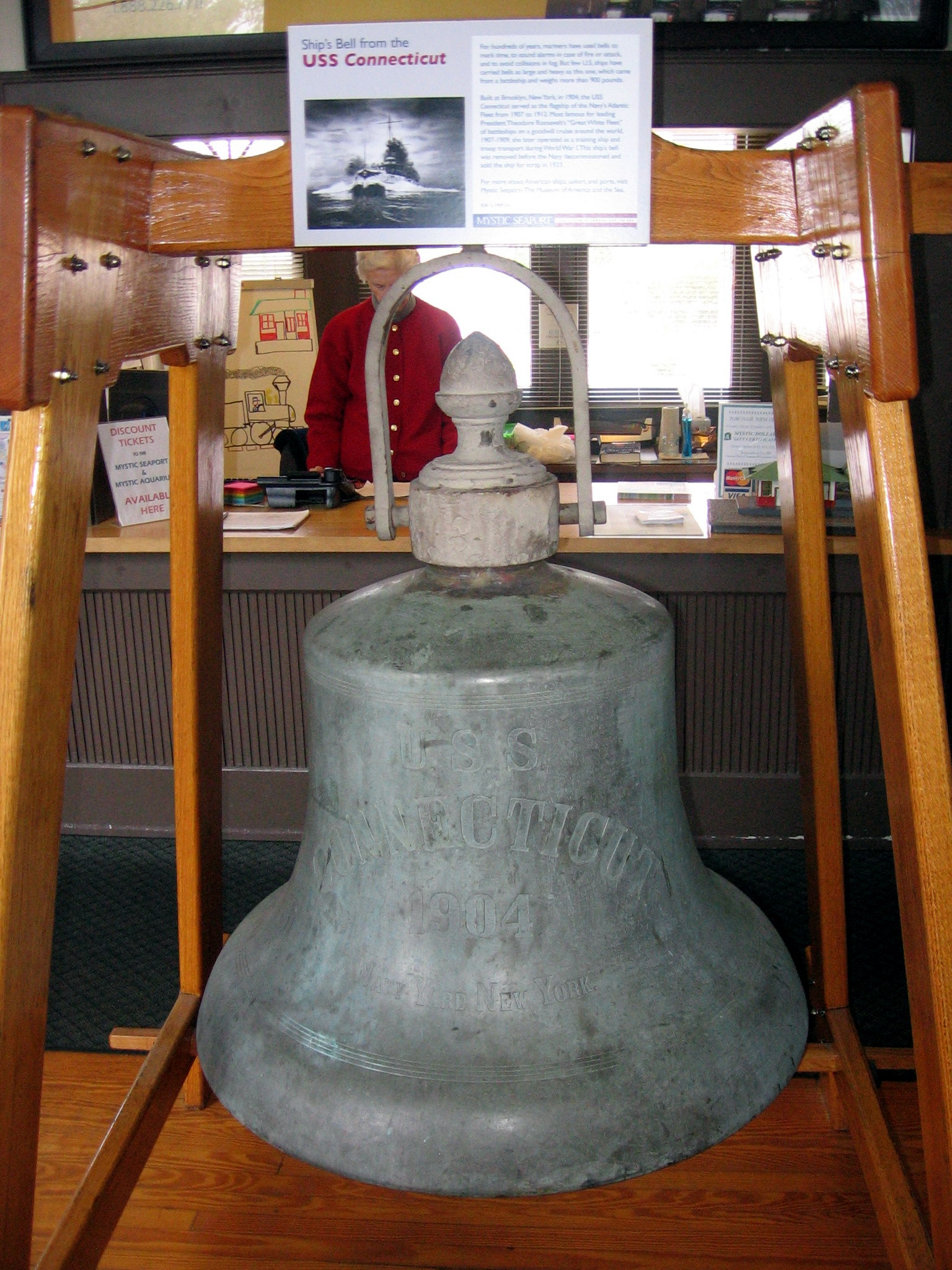
The Connecticut's bell on display in Mystic Depot

On 21 March 1921, Connecticut again became the flagship of the Second Battleship Squadron when Rear Admiral Charles Frederick Hughes took command. The ships of the squadron departed Philadelphia, on 7 April, to perform maneuvers and training exercises off Cuba, though they returned to take part in the Presidential Review in Hampton Roads, on 28 April. After participating in Naval Academy celebrations on Memorial Day, Connecticut and her squadmates departed on a midshipman cruise which took them to Europe. On 28 June, Connecticut hosted a Norwegian delegation that included King Haakon VII, Prime Minister Otto Blehr, the Minister of Defence, and the First Sea Lord of the Royal Norwegian Navy. After arriving in Portugal, on 21 July, the battleship hosted the civil governor of the province of Lisbon and the commander-in-chief of the Portuguese Navy. Six days later, Connecticut hosted the Portuguese president, António José de Almeida. The battleship squadron departed for Guantánamo Bay, on 29 July, and, after arrival there, remained for gunnery practice and exercises. Connecticut, leaving the rest of the squadron, departed for Annapolis, and disembarked her midshipmen on 30 August, then proceeded to Philadelphia.

Connecticut departed Philadelphia, for California, on 4 October, for duty with the Pacific Fleet. After touching at San Diego, on 27 October, she arrived on 28 October, at San Pedro, where Rear Admiral H.O. Stickney designated her the flagship of Pacific Fleet Training. For the next few months, Connecticut cruised along the West Coast, taking part in exercises and commemorations. Under the terms of the Washington Naval Treaty, which set tonnage limits for its signatory nations, the Navy designated Connecticut for scrapping. Getting under way for her final voyage on 11 December, she made a five-day journey to the Puget Sound Navy Yard, where she was decommissioned on 1 March 1923. On 1 November 1923, the ex-Connecticut was sold for scrap to Walter W. Johnson, of San Francisco, for $42,750. In June 1924, the tug SS Roosevelt set a record for the largest tow by a single tug in history when she towed Connecticut from Seattle to Oakland, California, for scrapping.

== Bibliography ==
- Albertson, Mark (2007). U.S.S. Connecticut: Constitution State Battleship. Mustang, Oklahoma: Tate Publishing. ISBN 978-1-59886-739-8. OCLC 173513595.
- Babcock & Wilcox Company (1914). Forged Steel Water-tube Marine Boilers (1st issue, 2nd ed.). New York: Babcock & Wilcox. OCLC 2358875.
- Friedman, Norman (1985). U.S. Battleships: An Illustrated Design History. Annapolis, Maryland: Naval Institute Press. ISBN 0-87021-715-1. OCLC 12214729.
- Gleaves, Albert (1921). A History of the Transport Service: Adventures and Experiences of United States Transports and Cruisers in the World War. New York: George H. Doran Company. OCLC 976757.
- Hendrix, Henry (2009). Theodore Roosevelt's Naval Diplomacy: The U.S. Navy and the Birth of the American Century. Annapolis: Naval Institute Press. ISBN 978-1-61251-831-2.
