= Osgood (surname) =

Osgood is a surname. Notable people with the surname include:

- Bob Osgood (1915–1990), American track and field athlete
- Charles Osgood (1809–1890), American artist
- Charles E. Osgood (1916–1991), American psychologist
- Charles Osgood (1933–2024), American radio and television commentator
- Charlie Osgood, American Major League baseball pitcher
- Chris Osgood (born 1972), Canadian ice hockey player
- Dauphin William Osgood (1845–1880), American Board medical missionary to China
- Frances Sargent Osgood (née Locke, 1811–1850), American poet and author
- Gayton P. Osgood (1797–1861), American political figure
- Gretchen Osgood (1868–1961), American actress, singer, poet, and muse
- Herbert L. Osgood (1855–1918), American professor and historian
- Irene Osgood (1875–1922), American author and poet
- Jacob Osgood (1777–1844), American religious figure
- James R. Osgood (1836–1892), American publisher
- Jere Osgood (born 1936), American artisan in furniture and woodworking
- John C. Osgood (1851–1926), Colorado Industrialist
- Kassim Osgood (born 1980), American football player
- Keith Osgood (born 1955), British footballer
- Lawrence Osgood, Canadian-born American author and playwright
- Marion Osgood, American violinist, composer, and orchestra conductor
- Peter Osgood (1947–2006), British footballer
- Robert Bayley Osgood (1873–1956), American orthopedic surgeon and namesake of Osgood–Schlatter disease
- Robert Endicott Osgood (1921–1986), American expert on foreign and military policy and author of several significant texts on international relations
- Rockland Osgood (born 1958), American musician
- Russell K. Osgood (born 1948), American educator, college professor, president of Grinnell College
- Rusty Osgood (born 1966), American filmmaker and actor, AKA "Rusty Nails"
- Samuel Osgood (1747–1813), American merchant and statesman
- Samuel Stillman Osgood (1805–1885), American artist
- Vicky Osgood (1953–2017), British obstetrician
- Wilfred Hudson Osgood (1875–1947), American zoologist
- William Fogg Osgood (1864–1943), American mathematician
- Winchester Osgood (1870–1896), American football player

== Fictional characters ==
- Petronella Osgood, a Doctor Who character
- Jimmy Osgood, in the Static Shock episode "Jimmy"

== See also ==
- Osgood (disambiguation)
- Osgoode (disambiguation)
- Osgood–Schlatter disease, inflammation of the growth plate at the tibial tuberosity
