= Osgood =

Osgood may refer to:

== Places ==
=== United States ===
- Osgood, Idaho, an unincorporated community
- Osgood, Indiana, a town
- Osgood, Iowa, an unincorporated community
- Osgood, Missouri, a village
- Osgood, North Dakota, a former city, now a neighborhood of Fargo
- Osgood, Ohio, a village
- Osgood, West Virginia, an unincorporated community
- Osgood Mountains, Nevada
- Osgood Pond, Paul Smiths, New York
- Osgood Ditch, a mining ditch in Oregon

=== Canada ===
- Osgood River, Quebec

== People and fictional characters ==
- Osgood (surname), a list of people and fictional characters
- Osgood (given name), a list of people and fictional characters

== Other uses ==
- Osgood Building, Lewiston, Maine, a commercial building on the National Register of Historic Places
- Osgood Company, an American manufacturer of heavy machinery from 1910 to 1954

== See also ==
- Osgood curve, in mathematics
- Osgood Formation, a geologic formation in Indiana, Kentucky and Ohio, United States
- Osgood Farm, a historic farmhouse in Andover, Massachusetts, United States, on the National Register of Historic Places
- Osgood House (disambiguation)
- Osgood–Schlatter disease
- Osgoode (disambiguation)
