= William Macomb =

William Macomb may refer to:

- William H. Macomb (1819–1872), served in the United States Navy during the American Civil War
- William Macomb (merchant) (c. 1751–1796), his granduncle; merchant and member of the Legislative Assembly of Upper Canada
