= Louis Franklin Bache =

American military officer (1779–1819)

- Born: October 7, 1779
- Died: October 4, 1819 (aged 39)
- Spouse: Margaret Riley
- Children: 2

Louis Franklin Bache (/ˈbiːtʃ/ BEECH; October 7, 1779 – October 4, 1819) was the son of Richard Bache and Sarah Franklin Bache, the daughter of the American statesman Benjamin Franklin and his wife Deborah Read. Bache served as a lieutenant colonel in the Pennsylvania State Militia during the War of 1812 between the United States and Great Britain.

== Career ==
Bache was the commander of a detachment of 351 men in the Pennsylvania State Militia Volunteers which was assigned by Pennsylvania Governor Simon Snyder to defend the City of Philadelphia against the British in the War of 1812. In October 1814, Lieutenant Colonel Bache refused to submit to federal military takeover of his Pennsylvania State Militia detachment because his soldiers originally joined the state militia pursuant to a later-disputed agreement with Brigadier General Joseph Bloomfield that Bache's soldiers would always serve under their state (and not federal) militia officers.

Standing firm on principle, Bache and his five subordinate officers were arrested. Bache was court-martialed and was dismissed from military service. The military court decided not to punish Bache further because the court believed Bache's closing arguments: that he acted in good faith based upon Governor Snyder's orders, his motives were pure, and that trust was placed in him by his soldiers and the soldiers' parents who allowed their sons to volunteer only under the command of trusted state militia officers. The Bache court-martial case and the related U.S. Supreme Court case of United States v. Peters has been the subject of historical discussion regarding federal-state relations and balance of power.

== Personal life ==
Bache married Margaret Riley (1781–1806) in 1802. They had two children together:

- Margaret Bache (1803–1871)
- Louis Franklin Bache Jr. (1805–1887)

Bache died on October 4, 1818.
