= Sheona =

Sheona is a given name. It may refer to:

- Sheona Macleod, English physician
- Sheona White, English horn player
