= Richard Bache =

English-American businessman and postmaster (1737–1811)

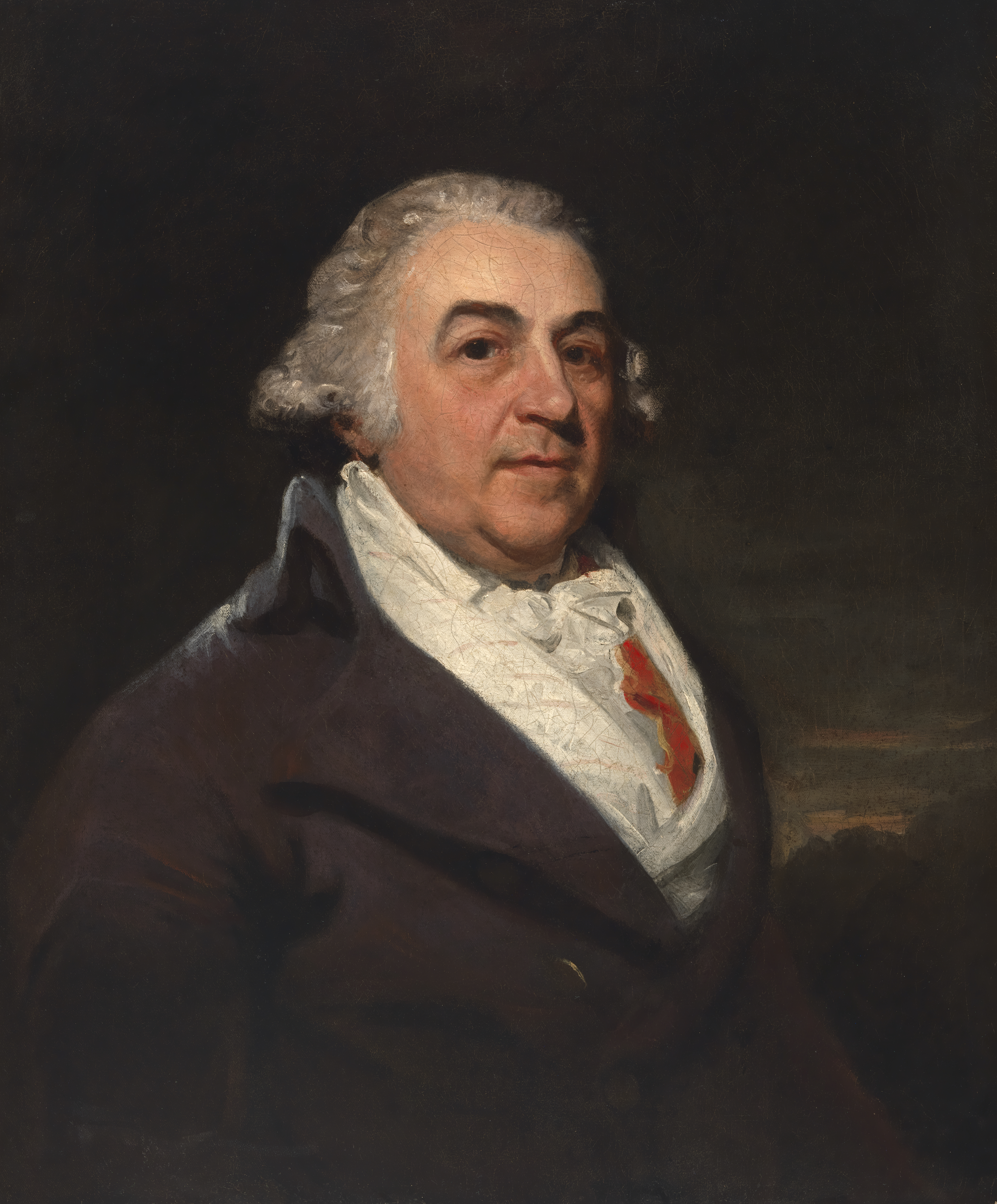
- Portrait by John Hoppner, c. 1792-93

2nd United States Postmaster General
- In office November 7, 1776 – January 28, 1782
- Appointed by: Continental Congress
- Preceded by: Benjamin Franklin
- Succeeded by: Ebenezer Hazard

Personal details
- Born: September 12, 1737 Settle, West Riding of Yorkshire, England
- Died: April 17, 1811 (aged 73) Bucks County, Pennsylvania, U.S.
- Spouse: Sarah Franklin (m. 1767; died 1808)
- Children: Benjamin Franklin Bache; William Franklin Bache; Sarah Franklin Bache; Eliza Harwood; Louis Franklin Bache; Deborah Duane; Richard Bache Jr.; Sarah Sergeant

Richard Bache (/ˈbiːtʃ/ BEECH; September 12, 1737 – April 17, 1811) was a businessman, a marine insurance underwriter, and later served as Postmaster-General of the American Post Office. He also was the son-in-law of Benjamin Franklin.

== Early life ==
Bache was born on September 12, 1737, in Settle, West Riding of Yorkshire, the youngest child of William Bache, a tax collector, and Mary (née Blechynden) Bache, who were married around 1720. His older brother was Theophylact Bache, who married Ann Dorothea Barclay (a daughter of Andrew Barclay and Helena (née Roosevelt) Barclay).

In 1751, his elder brother Theophylact arrived in New York City, where he was taken under the wing of Paul Richard, a successful merchant and former mayor, whose wife was a Bache relative.

== Career ==
Bache immigrated as a young man in 1760 to New York to join his brother Theophylact in a dry goods and marine insurance business. After a couple of years, he went to Philadelphia, where he prospered for several years. He was among nearly 30 young men who in October 1766 met at the city's London Coffee House to found the Gloucester Fox Hunting Club (GFHC), the first in America, to take up a pursuit closely associated with becoming "true Englishmen."

In 1767, Bache suffered financial problems when debts contracted by him were repudiated by his London associate, Edward Green.

=== Later years ===
During the American Revolution, Bache served on the Board of War, which was a special standing committee to oversee the Continental Army's administration and to make recommendations regarding the army to Congress. His wife, Sally, was widely known for her patriotism and charitable activities. After immigrating to North America, he acquired ownership of a slave named Bob.

Franklin later arranged an appointment for Bache, as the US Postmaster General (1776–1782), to succeed him. After Franklin's death in 1790, Bache and Sally lived off her inheritance from Franklin, moving their family to the Vandegrift residence in 1794, along the Delaware River north of Philadelphia.

== Personal life ==
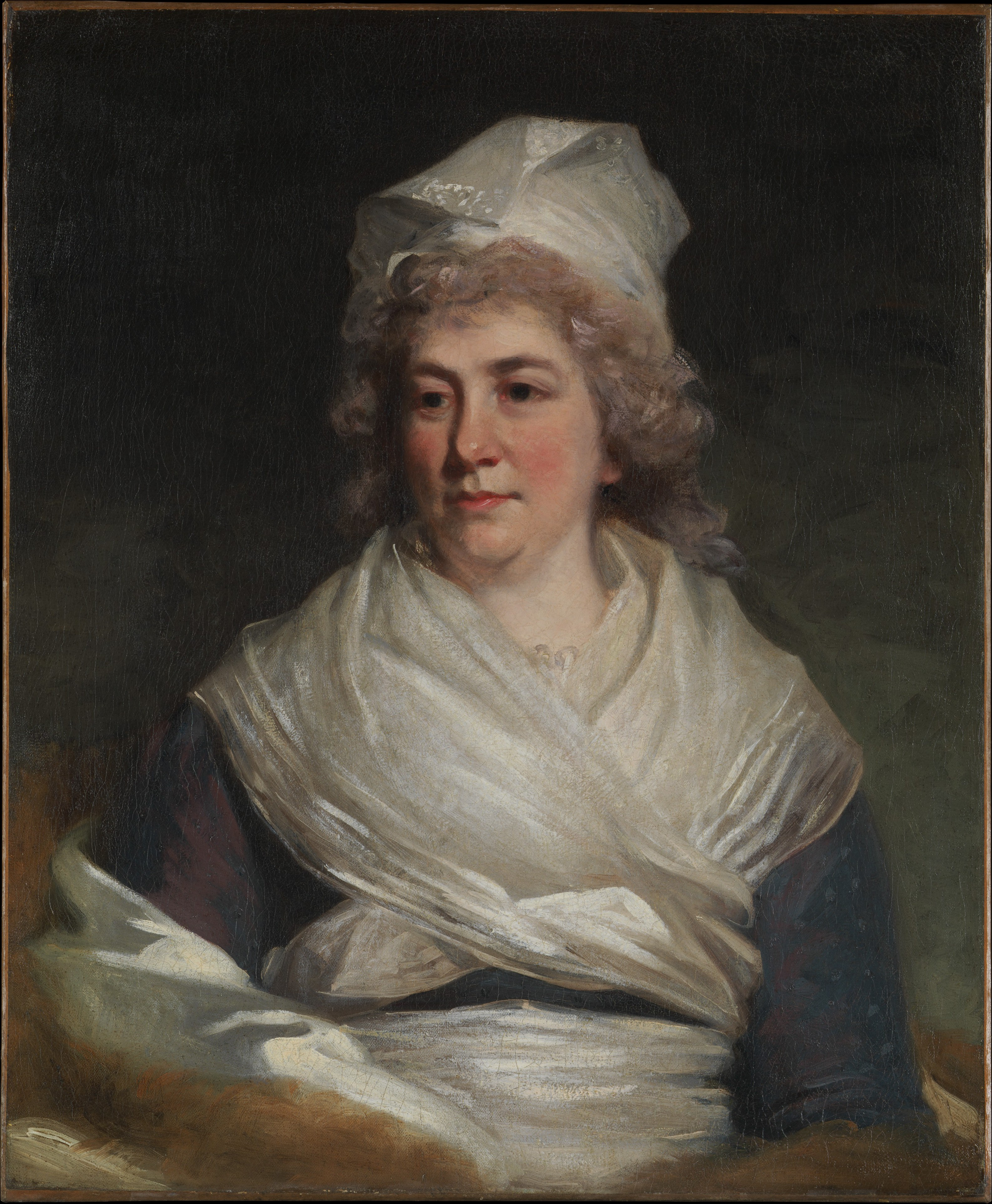
Bache's wife, Sarah Franklin, painted by John Hoppner (1793)

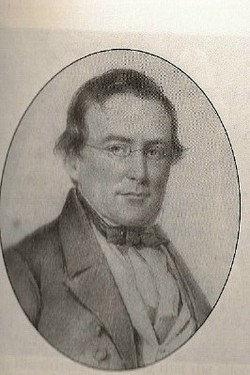
Bache's eldest son, Benjamin Franklin Bache.

In 1767, Bache had proposed to Sarah Franklin (1743–1808), known as Sally, the only daughter of Benjamin Franklin and Deborah Read. They objected, given his precarious finances and rumors that Bache was a fortune hunter. Although Franklin and his wife Deborah Read never formally approved, they acquiesced to the marriage in 1767. Richard and Sally Bache had eight children together:

- Benjamin Franklin Bache (1769–1798), who became a journalist and publisher, founding a newspaper. He was a spokesman for the Jeffersonian Republicans; he strenuously opposed George Washington, John Adams and the Federalist party. He died during the Philadelphia yellow fever epidemic. He ran the Aurora newspaper and printing business with his wife Margaret Hartman Markoe Bache.
- William Franklin Bache (1773–1814), who married Catherine Wistar.
- Sarah Franklin Bache (1775–1776)
- Eliza Franklin Bache (1777–1820) married John Harwood.
- Louis Franklin Bache (1779–1818), a Lt. Col. in the Pennsylvania State Militia Volunteers during the War of 1812 who married Mary Ann Swift and, after her death, Esther Egee.
- Deborah Franklin Bache (1781–1863), who married William J. Duane, a lawyer who was appointed as the 11th United States Secretary of the Treasury.
- Richard Franklin Bache (1784–1848), who served in the Republic of Texas Navy and served in the Second Texas Legislature. He married Sophia Durrell Dallas, eldest daughter of Alexander J. Dallas.
- Sarah Franklin Bache (1788–1863), married Thomas Sergeant, an associate justice of the Pennsylvania Supreme Court and postmaster of Philadelphia.

Sally, a leader in relief work during the War and for women in the pro-independence effort, died from cancer in Philadelphia on October 5, 1808. Bache died in Bucks County, Pennsylvania, on April 17, 1811. He was buried alongside his wife at Christ Church Burial Ground in Philadelphia.

== Descendants ==
Through his son William, he was a grandfather of U.S. Navy surgeon Benjamin Franklin Bache (1801–1881). Through his son Richard, he was a grandfather of the physicist Alexander Dallas Bache (1806–1867) and Mary Blechynden Bache (1808–1873), wife of Secretary of the Treasury, Governor of Kansas, and U.S. Senator from Mississippi, Robert John Walker and mother of five children, including Union Army General Duncan Stephen Walker.

Through his daughter Eliza, he was a grandfather of the United States Navy Admiral Andrew A. Harwood. Through his youngest daughter Sarah, he was a great-grandfather of Margaret Mason Perry (of the Perry family of Rhode Island) who married John La Farge.

Political offices
Preceded by Benjamin Franklin	United States Postmaster General; 1776–1782	Succeeded by Ebenezer Hazard
