= Andrew A. Harwood =

American admiral (1802–1884)

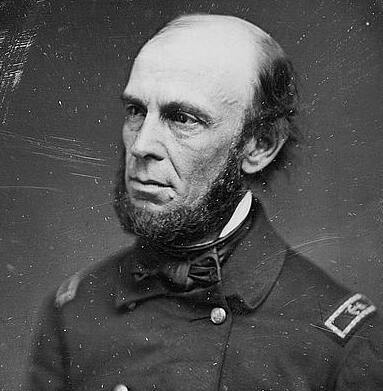
- A.A. Harwood by Matthew Brady c. 1848–1960
- Born: October 9, 1802; Bucks County, Pennsylvania, U.S.
- Died: August 28, 1884 (aged 81); Marion, Massachusetts, U.S.
- Burial place: Marion, Massachusetts
- Relatives: Sarah Franklin Bache, maternal grandmother; Richard Bache, maternal grandfather; Benjamin Franklin, maternal great-grandfather; Deborah Read, maternal great-grandmother
- Military career
- Branch: United States Navy
- Service years: 1818–1864
- Rank: Commodore, changed to Rear admiral (lower half) while on the retired list

Andrew Allen Harwood (October 9, 1802 – August 28, 1884) was an admiral in the United States Navy.

== Early life and education ==
Harwood was born on October 9, 1802, in Settle Farm, Bucks County, Pennsylvania. He was the son of John Edmund Harwood and Elizabeth Franklin Bache. His maternal grandparents were Sarah Franklin Bache and Richard Bache. He was a great-grandson of Benjamin Franklin, one of the Founding Fathers of the United States, and Deborah Read. He had his early education in local schools.

== Naval career ==
At the age of 16, Harwood was appointed a midshipman in the Navy in 1818. From 1819 until 1821 he served in the West Indies on the sloop-of-war USS Hornet in the suppression of the African slave trade. He served in the Mediterranean and at the Philadelphia Navy Yard before being promoted to lieutenant in 1827 when he was appointed to USS Sea Gull, which was the receiving ship at Philadelphia, Pennsylvania. He was detached as special messenger to bring home the ratified treaty with Naples, and from 1835 till 1837 served in the Mediterranean squadron. Two decades of further duty afloat and ashore, including a long assignment with the Bureau of Ordnance and Hydrography, were recognized with Commander's rank in 1848. During 1852–1855 he made a Mediterranean deployment on the frigate Cumberland.

After 1855 Captain Harwood served in shore posts, among them a tour as Chief of the Bureau of Ordnance and Hydrography in 1858–1862. Promoted to commodore in mid-1862, he was in charge of the Washington Navy Yard and the Potomac Flotilla until December 1863.

Commodore Harwood subsequently was appointed as a member of the Board of Examiners and Secretary of the Light House Board, remaining on the job in retired status from October 1864 onward. Beginning in 1869, when he was promoted to rear admiral on the Retired List, he held legal positions, concluding with a year as the Navy's Judge Advocate in 1870–1871. During retirement he served as secretary of the light house board, and a member of the examining board from 1864 till 1869, when he was made rear admiral on the retired list. During the American Civil War he prepared a work on "Summary Courts-Martial," and published the "Law and Practice of United States Navy Courts-Martial" (1867).

== Relatives ==
He was the nephew of Benjamin Franklin Bache and Richard Bache Jr. He is a cousin of Richard Wainwright and Richard Wainwright Jr., both naval officers as well, and Alexander Dallas Bache, Superintendent of the United States Coast Survey. In 1844, he married Margaret Bleeker Luce, the sister of Rear Admiral Stephen B. Luce.

== Death ==
Rear Admiral Andrew A. Harwood died in Marion, Massachusetts, on August 28, 1884. He is buried in a family plot in Marion, Massachusetts.
