= Sarah Franklin Bache =

Daughter of Benjamin Franklin (1743-1808)

Sarah Franklin
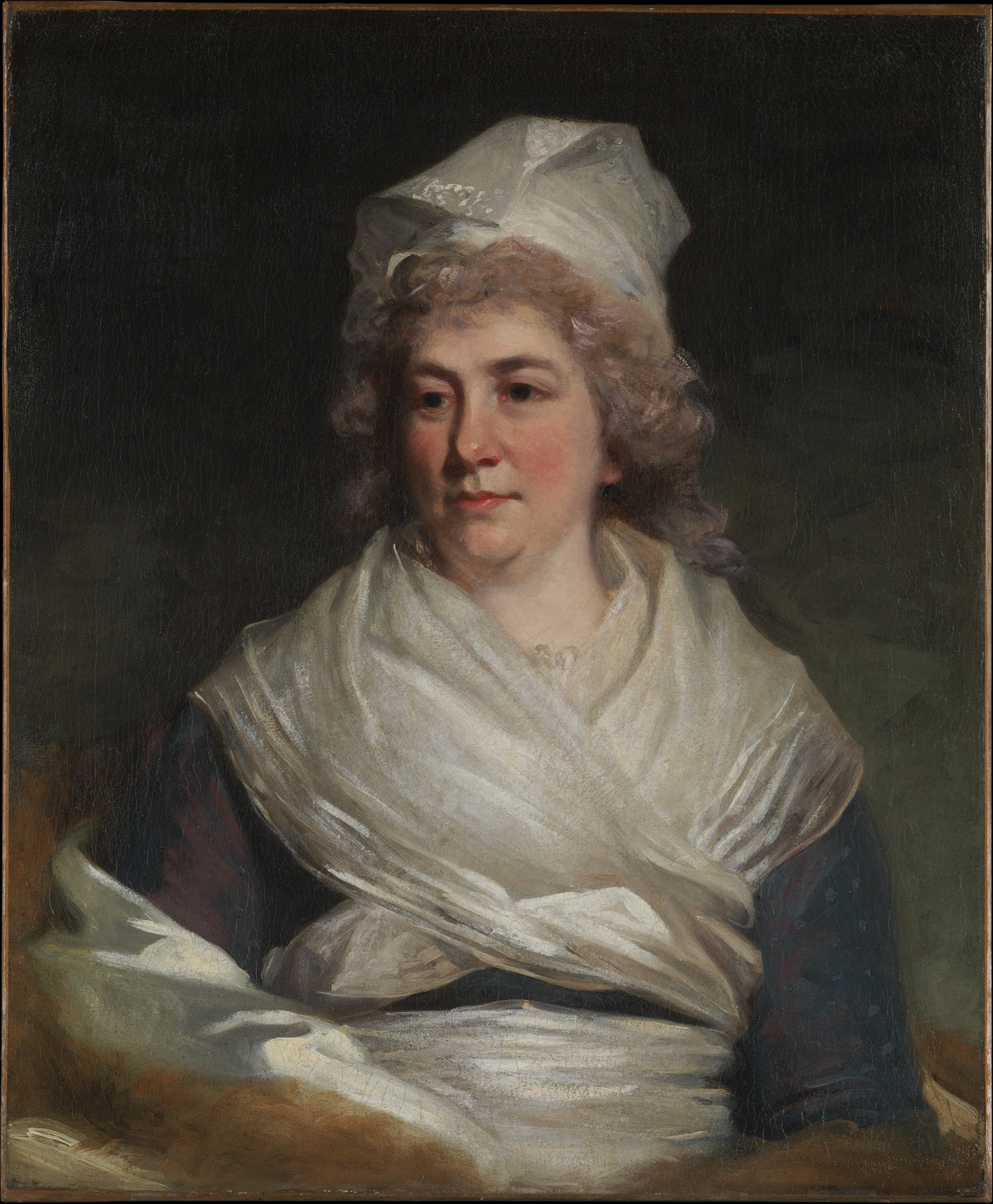
- Sarah Franklin Bache, a 1793 portrait by John Hoppner
- Born: Sarah Franklin; September 11, 1743; Philadelphia, Province of Pennsylvania, British America
- Died: October 5, 1808 (aged 65); Philadelphia, Pennsylvania, U.S.
- Spouse: Richard Bache (m. 1767)
- Children: Benjamin Franklin Bache; William Franklin Bache; Sarah Franklin Bache; Eliza Harwood; Louis Franklin Bache; Deborah Duane; Richard Bache Jr.; Sarah Sergeant
- Parent(s): Benjamin Franklin; Deborah Read
- Relatives: William (paternal half-brother); Francis (brother)

Sarah Franklin Bache (/ˈbiːtʃ/ BEECH; September 11, 1743 – October 5, 1808), sometimes known as Sally Bache, was the daughter of Benjamin Franklin and Deborah Read. She was a leader in relief work during the American Revolutionary War and frequently served as her father's political hostess, like her mother before her death in 1774. Sarah was also an important leader for women in the pro-independence effort in Philadelphia. She was an active member of the community until her death in 1808. She was 65 years old.

== Early life and education ==
When Sarah was born in 1743, Benjamin Franklin was thirty-seven and intently focused on furthering his career and wealth. Growing up, Sarah did not have a very close relationship with her father. Franklin's reserved nature towards his daughter may have been partially due to the previous loss of Sarah's older brother, Francis. But Franklin was also deep into his experimentation with electricity by the time Sarah was a young child, and by her early teenage years, he had left for Europe.

Franklin would begin to consider men and women as more intellectually equal later in his life, but he did not take this approach to his own children and grandchildren. It was not unusual for men during this time to take a more aloof approach towards their daughters' education than towards their sons' education. Daughters were typically given the education they would need to be good housewives as that would be their most important job. The education Sarah received was thus typical for women of her status during the 18th century. She was taught reading, writing, arithmetic, spinning, knitting, and embroidery. Franklin also had Sarah enrolled in dance school.

When Franklin traveled to Europe in Sarah's early adolescence, he left Deborah Read to take care of the "Education of my dear child." It is also possible that Sarah learned French. Benjamin Franklin once gave Sarah a copy of Samuel Richardson's Pamela; or, Virtue Rewarded in a French translation to "help her with her French. She must have already read it in English."

== Marriage and family ==
Sarah married Richard Bache on October 29, 1767. At the time, Bache was a merchant in Philadelphia and New York City. Sarah's family was concerned about this match, particularly her half-brother William. He wrote a letter to their father that said if Sarah married Richard Bache the couple would always be dependent on him for financial assistance. Dr. Franklin replied that he trusted his wife's judgment of the situation and told his wife to be frugal with their money. The marriage went on without the knowledge of Sarah's father and for the next year he denied the fact that he had a son-in-law at all. Though he was not initially pleased with the marriage between his daughter and Bache, Franklin received his son-in-law "with open arms" when they finally met in 1771. After the couple married, they lived in the Franklin's house in Philadelphia along with Sarah's mother. When Deborah Read died in 1774 of a stroke, the couple still lived in the house. The couple had eight children together:

- Benjamin Franklin Bache (1769–1798; died during the Philadelphia yellow fever epidemic). A publisher, he was jailed and awaiting trial under the Sedition Act at the time of his death. Married to Margaret Hartman Markoe. The couple had four children.
- William Franklin Bache (May 31, 1773 – 1814), married Catherine Wistar. Their son was Benjamin Franklin Bache.
- Sarah Franklin Bache (December 1, 1775 – August 17, 1776)
- Eliza Franklin Bache (September 10, 1777 – 1820) married John Harwood. Their son was Andrew A. Harwood.
- Louis Franklin Bache (October 7, 1779 – October 4, 1818), married Mary Ann Swift and had three children. He also had one child with his second wife, Esther Egee. He was a lieutenant colonel in the Pennsylvania State Militia Volunteers during the War of 1812. Assigned by Pennsylvania Gov. Snyder to defend the City of Philadelphia against the British.
- Deborah Franklin Bache (October 1, 1781 – February 12, 1863) married William J. Duane, a lawyer who was appointed as the 11th United States Secretary of the Treasury.
- Richard Franklin Bache (March 11, 1784 – March 17, 1848), married Sophia Durrell Dallas, the eldest daughter of Arabella Maria Smith and Alexander J. Dallas. Bache, Jr. became a politician in Texas.
- Sarah Franklin Bache (September 12, 1788 – October 6, 1863), married Thomas Sergeant (1782–1860), who later was appointed as an associate justice of the Pennsylvania Supreme Court and postmaster of Philadelphia. They were the grandparents of Margaret Mason Perry (of the Perry family of Rhode Island) who married John La Farge.

== Revolutionary War years ==
Sarah Franklin was an ardent Patriot during the American Revolutionary War. She did extensive relief work. While Benjamin Franklin was in France he received a letter from François Barbé-Marbois in which he wrote, “If there are in Europe any women who need a model of attachment to domestic duties and love for their country, Mrs. Franklin may be pointed out to them.”

She raised money for the Continental Army and is known for her involvement in the Ladies Association of Philadelphia. In 1780, under her leadership, the group made 2,200 shirts for the soldiers in the Continental Army at the army's winter quarters at Valley Forge. The women often met to work together at The Cliffs, a country estate owned by Samuel R. Fisher on the Schuylkill River, two miles north of Philadelphia. After her father's return in 1775 from a diplomatic mission to France, she frequently acted as his political hostess, as her mother had died in 1774.

Sarah fled from Philadelphia twice during the war. The first time happened in the later months of 1776, when in response to the approach of British forces, Sarah left Philadelphia with her children and aunt, Jane Mecom. The family moved to Chester County, Pennsylvania, but returned to Philadelphia after a short time. In September 1777, the family again took refuge away from Philadelphia, this time at a friend's home in Bucks County, Pennsylvania, and then in Manheim, Lancaster County, Pennsylvania. Sarah and her family remained there until British forces were evacuated from Philadelphia the next summer.

== Later life and relationship with Benjamin Franklin ==
Bache loved music and reading, and was considered a skilled harpsichordist.

Sarah Franklin Bache's relationship with her father was strained throughout her adulthood. After her marriage to Richard Bache without her father's knowledge, Benjamin Franklin had a detached attitude towards his only daughter. Evidence exists in The Autobiography of Benjamin Franklin which "constructs an image of a strong, powerful, and savvy patriarch, written for a male audience." The autobiography hardly mentions Franklin's wife, Deborah Read, and fails to mention his daughter Sally at all. When the American Revolutionary War ended, Benjamin returned to Philadelphia and lived with his daughter and her family for the remaining years of his life.

Benjamin Franklin really enjoyed his grandchildren, particularly Benjamin Franklin Bache. When Franklin returned from England in 1775 he became enthralled by his young grandson. So much so that the following year Franklin took his young grandson back to Europe with him in spite of the protests made by Sarah. "She was no match for a father who thought he knew more about bringing up boys than anyone else on Earth." Sarah had to make do with the promise that her son would receive the best education possible during his time with his grandfather.

When Benjamin Franklin died in 1790, he left most of his estate to Sarah and her husband. Among the items bequeathed to her was a small portrait of Louis XVI surrounded by diamonds, which she sold to finance a trip to London. In 1794, she and her family moved to a farm outside Philadelphia, to the north along the Delaware River.

Sarah Franklin Bache died from cancer on October 5, 1808, at age 65 and is buried in Christ Church Burial Ground at Fifth and Arch Streets in Philadelphia, the same resting grounds as her parents. Her descendants included Major General Hugh L. Scott, who was her great-great grandson. (Note: The family line ran from Scott to Elizabeth Hodge (mother) to Sarah Bache (grandmother) to Dr. William Bache (great-grandfather) to Sarah Franklin Bache (great-great grandmother) to Franklin (great-great-great grandfather.))
