= Richard Bache Jr. =

American military and political official (1784–1848)

- Born: March 11, 1784; Philadelphia, Pennsylvania, US
- Died: March 17, 1848 (aged 64); Austin, Texas, US
- Occupations: Military Officer; Postmaster; Texas State Senator
- Years active: 1812–1848
- Known for: Voting against Texas annexation in 1845
- Notable work: Texas Constitution of 1845
- Spouse: Sophia Burrell Dallas (m. 1805; Death 1860)
- Children: 9 (including Alexander)
- Parents: Richard Bache (father); Sarah Franklin Bache (mother)

Richard Franklin Bache (/ˈbiːtʃ/ BEECH; March 11, 1784 – March 17, 1848), also known as Richard Bache Jr., was a military and political official in the Republic and state of Texas. He assisted in drafting the Texas Constitution of 1845, the first of its five state constitutions.

== Biography ==
=== Early life and parents ===
Bache was born on March 11, 1784, in Philadelphia, the son of Richard Bache Sr., a marine insurance underwriter and importer. Bache Sr. had also served as United States Postmaster General from 1776 to 1782. Bache Jr. attended the University of Pennsylvania, graduating in 1812. In about 1819, he was the publisher of the Franklin Gazette, a democratic newspaper in Philadelphia, along with John Norvell. Norvell founded the Philadelphia Inquirer after leaving the Gazette and later moved to Michigan, where he was elected as one of the new state's first U.S. Senators.

Bache's mother was Sarah Franklin Bache (September 11, 1743 – October 5, 1808), known as Sally, the only daughter of Benjamin Franklin, one of the Founding Fathers of the United States, and his common-law wife, Deborah Read.

Bache grew up in a large family of eight. Among his siblings were his older brother, Benjamin Franklin Bache, a controversial newspaper publisher who died of yellow fever at the age of 29. One of Bache's nephews was Andrew A. Harwood, a naval officer who reached the rank of admiral.

=== Marriage and family ===
On April 4, 1805, Bache married Sophia Burrell Dallas, the daughter of Arabella Maria Smith and Alexander J. Dallas. Her father later was appointed as the U.S. Treasury Secretary under President James Madison.

Bache and Dallas had nine children together:

- Alexander Dallas Bache (1806–1867)
- Mary Blechenden Bache (1808–1873), married Robert John Walker, who was appointed Secretary of the Treasury under President James Knox Polk.
- George Mifflin Bache (1811–1846), whose son was George Mifflin Bache Jr.
- Richard Bache III (1813–1850)
- Sophia Arabella Bache (1815–1904), who married William Wallace Irwin, later Mayor of Pittsburgh and elected as a Whig member of the U.S. House of Representatives from Pennsylvania.
- Matilda Wilkins Bache (1819–1900), who married William H. Emory, later a United States Army general and surveyor of Texas.
- Henrietta Constantia Bache (1822–1887)
- Sarah Franklin Bache (1824–1880), who married Richard Wainwright, a naval officer during the American Civil War
- Maria Campbell Bache (1827–1851), who married Allan McLane, son of Secretary of State Louis McLane and brother of Gov. Robert Milligan McLane.

=== Career ===
Bache served as a captain of the Franklin Flying Artillery of the Philadelphia Volunteers in the War of 1812. He also served in the United States Navy. He was later appointed a postmaster in Philadelphia.

In 1832, he abandoned his family and moved to Texas, possibly for financial reasons. He settled in Stephen F. Austin's colony at Brazoria and served on the Zavala in the Texas Navy. On May 1, 1836, he joined the Louisiana Independent Volunteers, commanded by J. J. Robinson, who were supporting the Texas War of Independence. While in service, Bache guarded the Mexican general Antonio López de Santa Anna after the Battle of San Jacinto.

In 1838–39 Bache served as chief clerk in the Navy Department in Houston. He was appointed as enrolling clerk of the House of Representatives in the Third Congress of the Texas Republic.

In 1842, Bache settled in Galveston, Texas, where he afterward held a number of appointed government posts. He became commissioner of the navy yard and was appointed as collector of customs, and later as a justice of the peace for Galveston County. In 1845, he was elected as a delegate to the Texas Annexation convention. He was the only elected official to vote against annexation, allegedly because he did not wish to enlarge the domain of his brother-in-law, George M. Dallas, then vice-president of the United States. Bache helped draft the Constitution of 1845. He was elected twice, to the First and Second Texas Legislatures, representing Galveston in the Texas Senate, District 11.

=== Death ===
Bache died in Austin, Texas, on March 17, 1848, and is buried at Oakwood Cemetery.
