= Osgood House =

Osgood House may refer to the following American houses:

- Dr. H. G. Osgood House, Gosport, Indiana, on the National Register of Historic Places (NRHP)
- Nathaniel Osgood House, Durham, Maine, on the NRHP
- Osgood Family House, Fryeburg, Maine, on the NRHP
- Unitarian Universalist Church of Medford and the Osgood House, Medford, Massachusetts, a Unitarian Universalist church building and parsonage house on the NRHP
- Col. John Osgood House, North Andover, Massachusetts, on the NRHP
- Samuel Osgood House (North Andover, Massachusetts), on the NRHP
- Samuel Osgood House, Manhattan, New York, first official residence of the President of the United States

== See also ==
- Nathaniel Bowditch House, Sale, Massachusetts, sometimes called the Bowditch-Osgood House, on the NRHP
