= Alexander Macomb House =

Second U.S. Presidential Mansion in New York City

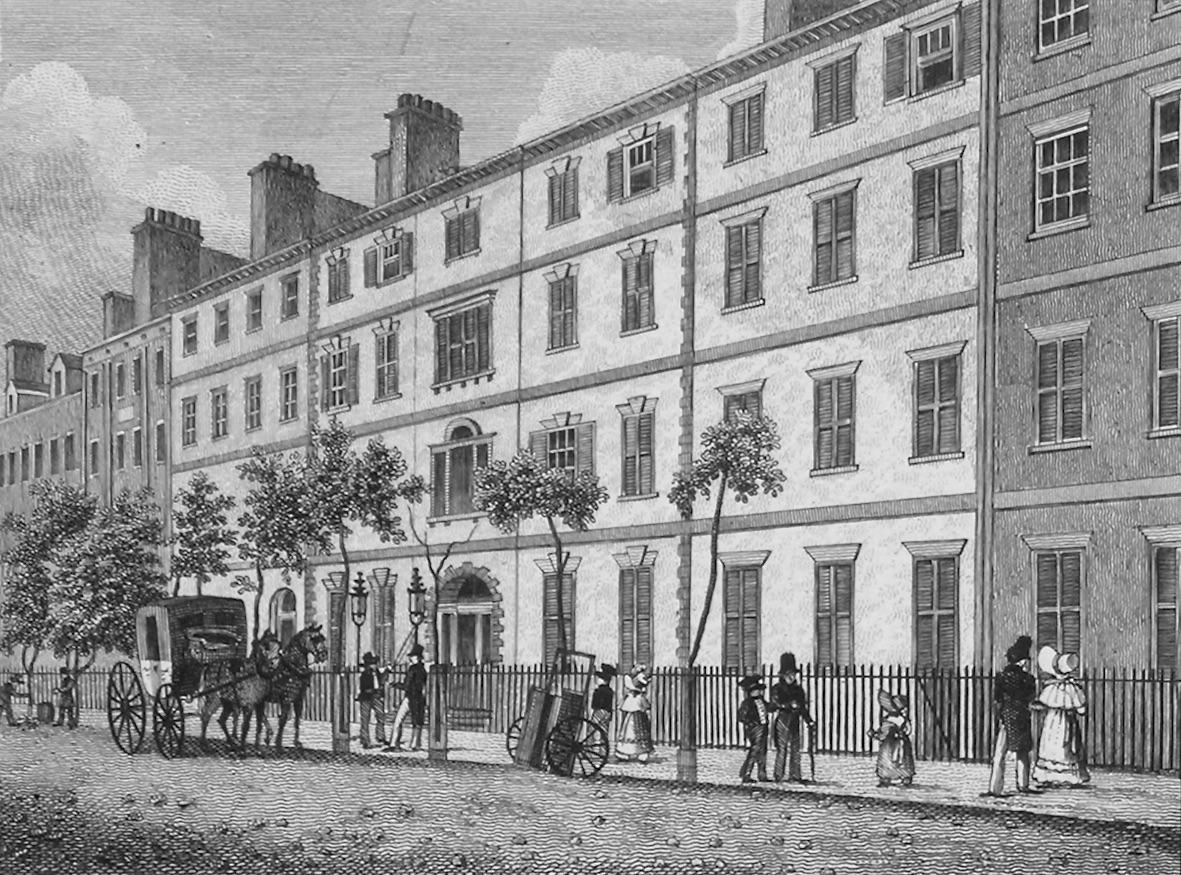
- Second Presidential Mansion (the 4-bay house behind the coach), occupied by George Washington from February to August 1790
- Interactive map of the Alexander Macomb House area
- Former names: Mansion House Hotel; Bunker's Mansion House Hotel

General information
- Location: 39-41 Broadway, Lower Manhattan, New York City, New York, United States
- Coordinates: 40.7063°N 74.0132°W
- Construction started: 1786–1788
- Demolished: 1940
- Client: Alexander Macomb

The Alexander Macomb House at 39–41 Broadway in Lower Manhattan, New York City, served as the second U.S. Presidential Mansion. President George Washington occupied it from February 23 to August 30, 1790, during New York City's two-year term as national capital. The house was the last surviving former U.S. presidential mansion, until it was demolished in 1940.

== Macomb ==
Alexander Macomb (1748–1831) was an Irish-born American merchant and land speculator. He built the four-story city house on the west side of Broadway in 1786–1788. Macomb leased it to the French Minister Plenipotentiary, the Comte de Moustier, who occupied it until his return to Paris in early 1790.

It was one of a block of three houses erected in 1787 and was four stories and an attic high, with a width of fifty-six feet. From the rear of the main rooms glass doors opened onto a balcony giving an uninterrupted view of the Hudson River. On entering, one found a large hall with a continuous flight of stairs to the top of the house. On each side of the hall were spacious, high-ceilinged rooms, used for the levees and dinners and always referred to by Washington as "public rooms."

President Washington purchased furniture, mirrors and draperies from the departing Minister with his own money, including American-made furniture in the French style. Some of these items survive at Mount Vernon and elsewhere.

== Presidential Mansion ==
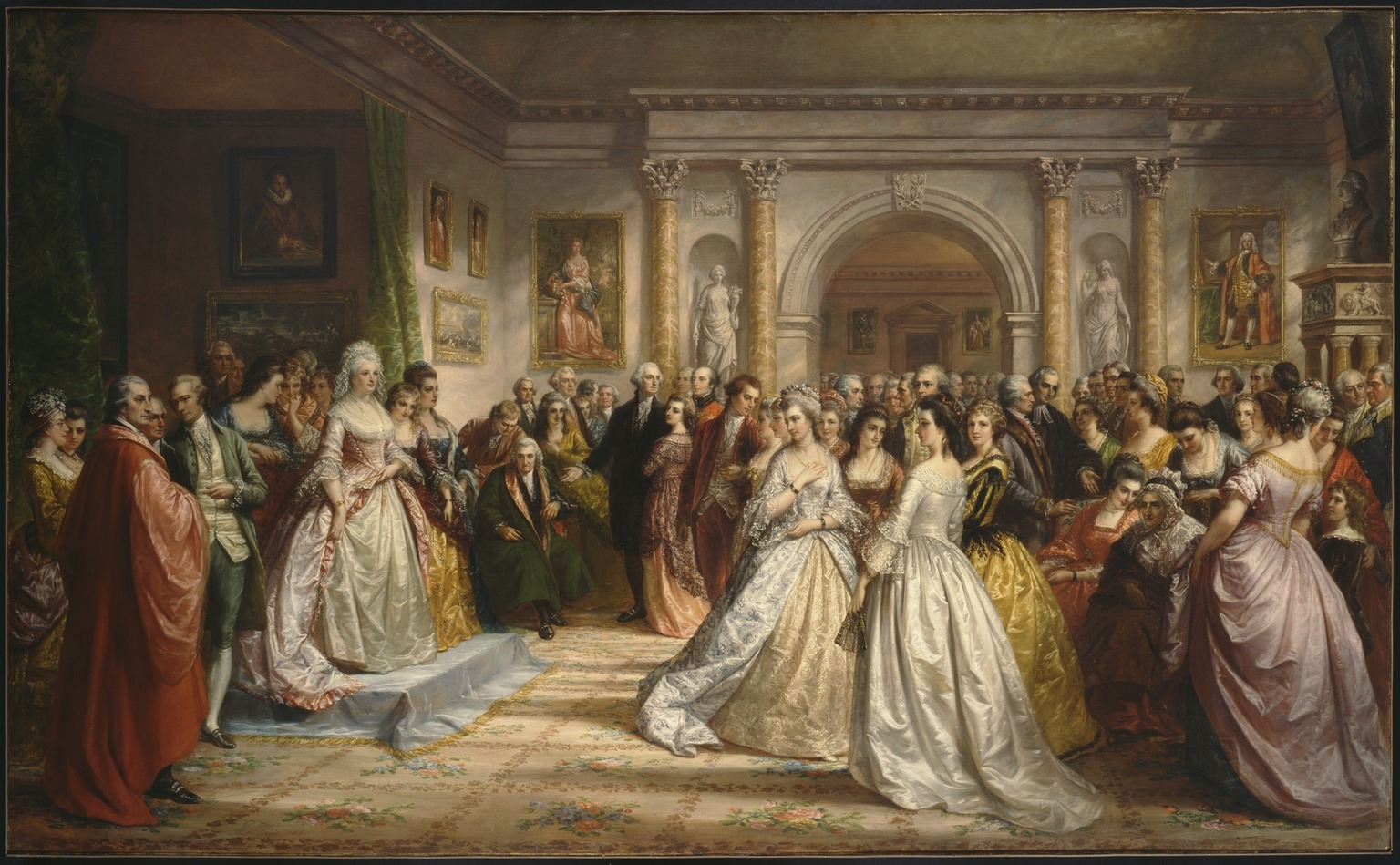
Daniel Huntington, The Republican Court: Lady Washington's Reception Day (c. 1861), Brooklyn Museum

The first Presidential Mansion was the Samuel Osgood House at 1 Cherry Street in Manhattan, which Washington occupied from April 23, 1789, to February 23, 1790. He had been living there a week prior to his April 30, 1789, inauguration as first President of the United States. The Osgood House (demolished 1856) was in the most congested part of Manhattan, near the port along the East River, and Washington found it cramped for his presidential household.

The Macomb House was significantly larger, located in a neighborhood just north of the Bowling Green.

The presidential household functioned with a staff of about 20, composed of wage workers, indentured servants and enslaved servants. Slavery was legal in New York, and Washington brought 7 enslaved Africans from Mount Vernon to work in his presidential household: William Lee, Christopher Sheels, Giles, Paris, Austin, Moll, and Oney Judge.

Under the July 1790 Residence Act, the national capital moved to Philadelphia, Pennsylvania, for a 10-year period while the permanent national capital was under construction in the District of Columbia. Washington vacated the Macomb House on August 30, 1790, and returned to Mount Vernon, stopping in Philadelphia to examine what was to become the third Presidential Mansion, the Masters–Penn–Morris House at 190 High Street.

== Hotel ==
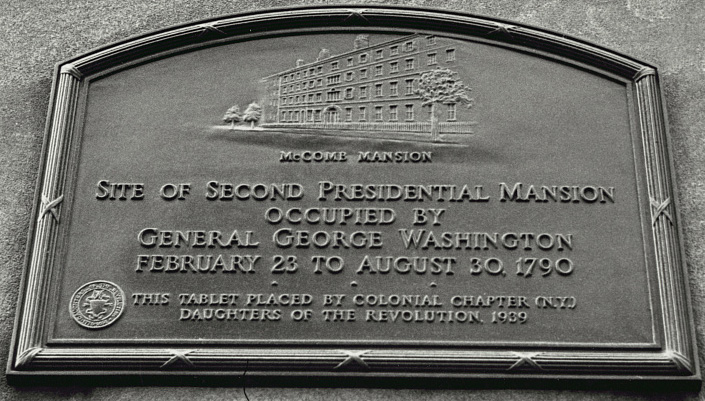
1939 DAR plaque

In 1821, the Macomb House was converted into a luxury hotel. The hotel was expanded northward into the adjoining houses, and their facades were altered to give a unified appearance.

Bunker's Mansion House, a famous hotel, was situated at No. 39 Broadway, and was a large double-brick house, erected in 1786 by General Alexander Macomb as a residence for himself. It was a most comfortable and well-conducted hotel, and was patronized largely by Southern families. Bunker, who was noted for his affability to his customers, grew rich rapidly, and eventually sold the property and retired from business.

In 1861, Daniel Huntington painted a fanciful depiction of the interior. "Mr. Huntington has in his famous painting of the Republican Court made the Macomb home on Broadway the background of his picture. This was a much more commodious house, to which the President and his family removed in the spring of 1790."

In 1939, the Daughters of the Revolution erected a bronze plaque at 39 Broadway. The Macomb House was demolished in 1940.

== See also ==
- Samuel Osgood House, first Presidential mansion
- President's House (Philadelphia), third Presidential mansion
- Germantown White House, twice temporarily occupied by President Washington
- White House/Executive Residence
- List of residences of presidents of the United States
