= Ebenezer Hazard =

American postmaster (1744–1817)

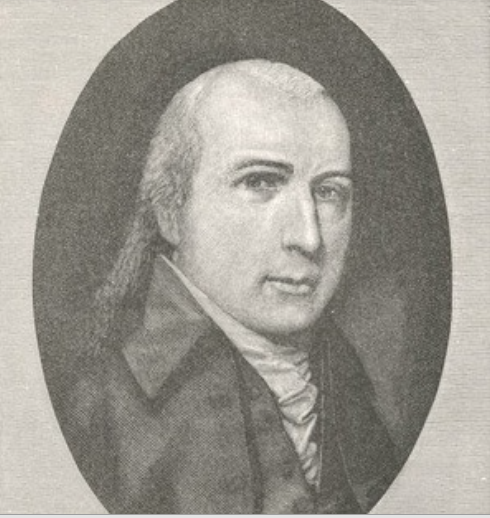

3rd United States Postmaster General
- In office January 28, 1782 – September 26, 1789
- Preceded by: Richard Bache
- Succeeded by: Samuel Osgood

Personal details
- Born: January 15, 1744 Philadelphia, Pennsylvania, British America
- Died: June 13, 1817 (aged 73) Philadelphia, Pennsylvania, U.S.
- Resting place: Laurel Hill Cemetery
- Spouse: Abigail Arthur (m. 1783)
- Education: Princeton University (BA)

Ebenezer Hazard (January 15, 1744 – June 13, 1817) was an American businessman and publisher. He served in a variety of political posts during and after the American Revolutionary War: as Postmaster of New York City; in 1776, as surveyor general of the Continental Post Office; United States Postmaster General where he served from 1782 to 1789.

In 1792, he published the first English translation of A Short Account of the Mohawk Indians, their Country, Language, Figure, Costume, Religion, and Government (1644), compiled from letters written by Dutch minister Johannes Megapolensis to friends about his years of ministry near present-day Albany, New York.

== Biography ==
Hazard was born in Philadelphia and educated at Princeton University. He established a publishing business in New York City in 1770 but quit that business after five years. He was appointed the first postmaster of the city under the Continental Congress.

In 1776, he was appointed as surveyor general of the Continental Post Office. He was elected a Fellow of the American Academy of Arts and Sciences in 1781, and was elected a member of the American Philosophical Society that same year.

In 1782, Hazard succeeded Richard Bache as the United States Postmaster General, serving until 1789. (From 1785 to 1790, New York City served as the capital of the United States.) During his tenure as Postmaster General under the new Federal Constitution, Hazard reorganized the Post Office. He established a system to transport mail by stagecoaches on main routes in order to increase capacity, displacing the old horse-and-rider system.

Hazard did not keep President George Washington's favor, however, because during the Constitutional Convention, he had put a stop to the customary practice by which newspaper publishers were allowed to distribute copies by mail. Washington wrote an indignant letter to John Jay about this action. He said that it was doing "mischief" by "inducing a belief that the suppression of intelligence at that critical juncture was a wicked trick of policy contrived by an aristocratic junto." As soon as Washington could take action, he had Hazard replaced by Samuel Osgood. As a member of the old Congress Osgood had served on a committee to examine the post-office accounts.

After being replaced, Hazard moved back to Philadelphia. He helped to establish the Insurance Company of North America in that city. He worked at this until his death. Long interested in history, in 1792, he printed the first English translation of Johannes Megapolensis' A Short Account of the Mohawk Indians, their Country, Language, Figure, Costume, Religion, and Government, first published in the Netherlands in 1644. It was a record of the Dutch missionary's observations of the Mohawk and their territory west of Albany, New York, during the period of Dutch rule. Megapolensis is considered the first Protestant missionary to Native Americans.

Hazard also published at Philadelphia his two-volume Historical Collections, Consisting of State Papers and Other Authentic Documents; Intended as Materials for an History of the United States of America. The first volume appeared in 1792, and the second in 1794.

== Personal life ==
Hazard married Abigail Arthur in 1783, and they had two children.

He died at his home in Philadelphia on June 13, 1817, and was interred at the Arch Street burying ground. His remains were later relocated to Laurel Hill Cemetery.

== External resources ==
- The Peter Force Library at the Library of Congress holds important compilations of pamphlets that were assembled by Ebenezer Hazard.

Political offices
Preceded by Richard Bache	United States Postmaster General; 1782–1789	Succeeded by Samuel Osgood
