= Francis Folger Franklin =

Son of Benjamin Franklin (1732–1736)

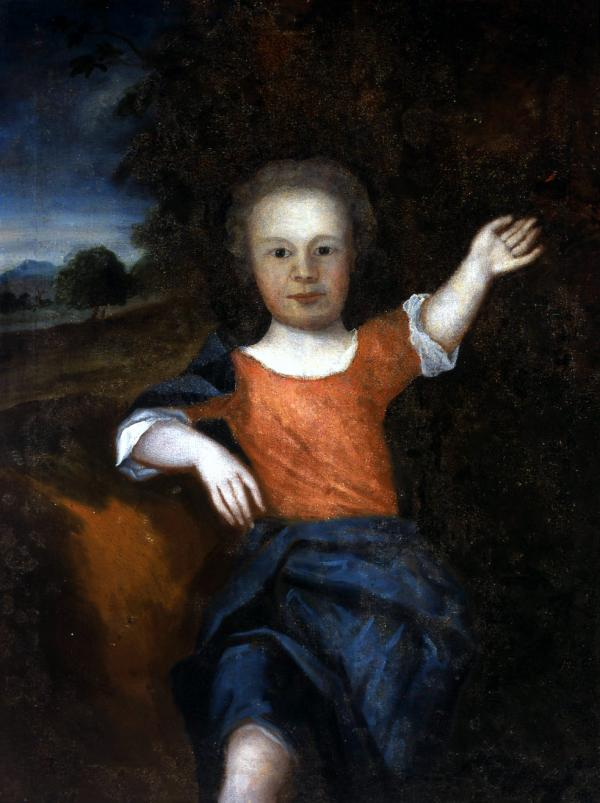
- Posthumous portrait of Francis, possibly by Samuel Johnson, a neighbor of B. Franklin , c. 1736–37.
- Born: October 20, 1732; Philadelphia, Province of Pennsylvania, British America
- Died: November 21, 1736 (aged 4); Philadelphia, Province of Pennsylvania, British America
- Cause of death: Smallpox
- Resting place: Christ Church Burial Ground
- Parents: Benjamin Franklin; Deborah Read
- Relatives: Sarah Franklin Bache (sister); William Franklin (paternal half-brother)

Francis Folger Franklin (October 20, 1732 – November 21, 1736) (Note: Note that the British Empire, including colonial America, used the Julian calendar prior to September 14, 1752. For more information, see Old Style and New Style dates.) was the son of Founding Father of the United States Benjamin Franklin and Deborah Read.

In 1736, four-year-old Francis contracted the smallpox virus and died shortly thereafter.

Benjamin Franklin, who had been inoculated earlier in his own life, had intended for his son to be inoculated as well. However, due to an illness affecting Francis at the time planned for his inoculation, the procedure was postponed.

His death devastated both his parents, who doted upon Francis, and after this incident, Franklin became "the most eloquent advocate of smallpox inoculation."

== Life ==
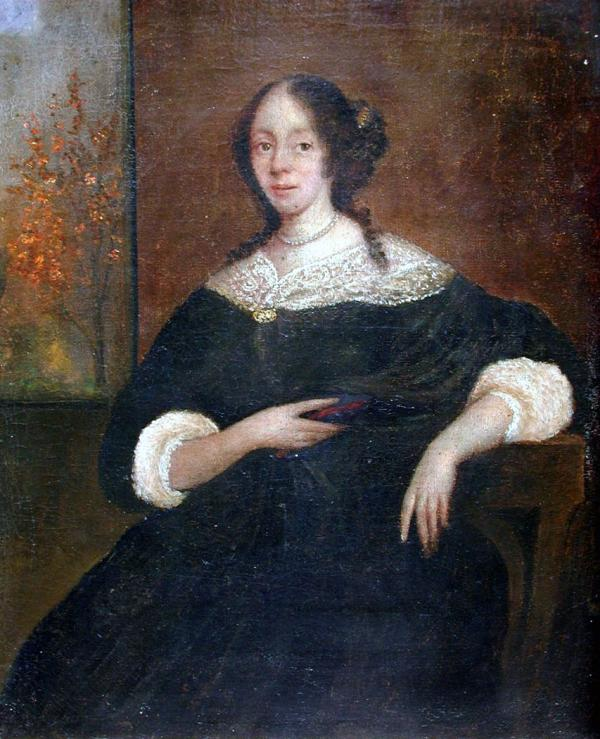
Abiah Folger Franklin, Francis' grandmother and eponym

Francis Folger Franklin was born on October 20, 1732, (Note: Some biographers give Francis' date of birth simply as October 1734 (Skemp 1994, p. 185), while most offer October 20 as a birthdate (Conn & Franklin 2011, p. 173; Lemay 2013, p. xi; Bouffard 2007, p. 95; Anderson 2000, p. 111). However, the inscription on Francis' tombstone reads "Aged 4 years 1 month 4 days," meaning Francis was born on October 17, instead of October 20.) in Philadelphia, Pennsylvania (then a colony in British America). He was the oldest marital child of Benjamin Franklin, then the publisher of the Pennsylvania Gazette, and Deborah Read. Franklin also had an extramarital son, William (born c. 1730–31), whose mother may have been a maid in the household, perhaps a woman named Barbara, or even Deborah Read herself. It has been suggested that William was Franklin's son by Deborah but was acknowledged as extramarital because he was conceived before his parents’ marriage. Some accounts argue that William's birth was legalized sometime after Francis' death, possibly because of the lack of an heir.

The baby's middle name, Folger, was the maiden name of Franklin's mother, Abiah. Franklin was proud of his maternal family (one of the first settlers of New England), and thus, in an era when it was unusual for ordinary people to receive a middle name, Francis was baptized as Francis Folger. Francis' baptism took place on September 16, 1733, while Franklin was away, at the Anglican Christ Church in Philadelphia, which Deborah attended.

Francis, affectionately called "Franky" by his parents, was described as a "precocious, curious and special" child by Franklin, "a golden child, his smiles brighter, his babblings more telling and his tricks more magical than all the other infants in the colonies combined" by historian of medicine Howard Markel and as "a most engaging child, of singular beauty and wonderful knowingness" by biographer James Parton. Given that Franklin considered Francis to be a "healthy child who thrived from the start," and "very clever," he advertised for a tutor for his two sons in December 1734. By all accounts, Francis was doted on by his parents; his portrait was painted while he was still a baby. By 1734, Franklin's business as a writer, publisher and founder of the Library Company of Philadelphia was going well enough that he was able to build a house for his family of four, at 318 Market Street. (Note: The original brick house was torn down in the 1800s, but the steel outline of house is replicated at the site, now known as Franklin Court.)

== Death and aftermath ==
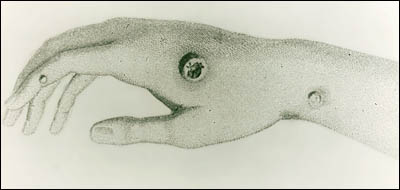
An illustration showing the effects of smallpox inoculation.

Franklin and his brother, James, criticized smallpox inoculation, which was performed by drawing a string, previously in contact with the pustules of a smallpox victim, through a small incision on the person being inoculated. At the time, inoculation offered a mortality chance of 2%, while smallpox contracted naturally was fatal to 15% of the infected. Later, while James still opposed inoculation, Franklin came to support it, believing it was a "safe and beneficial practice." In 1736, however, Francis contracted smallpox and died on November 21 of that year, without having been inoculated. Both Franklin and Deborah were devastated, and their devastation was compounded because they were unsure they could have another child. Franklin had written his paper "On the Death of Infants" while Francis was still alive and was inspired by his youngest son when writing about the beauty of babies. Francis was buried on the same day he died, his tombstone reading "The delight of all who knew him."

Rumors quickly surfaced that Francis had died after being inoculated, so Franklin wrote in the Pennsylvania Gazette, on December 30, that "[he] intended to get [Francis] inoculated as soon as he should have recovered sufficient strength from a flux with which he had been long afflicted," and that the boy "received the distemper in the common way of infection." However, the choice of having his son inoculated was a difficult one for Franklin, as Francis could die either way. Inoculation would become a real choice only if there was a high chance of smallpox being contracted naturally. In this case, the choice of having Francis inoculated was justified, even with its 2% mortality rate.

After Francis' death, Franklin became involved in promoting inoculation in Philadelphia: he published many studies on its value, working with several physicians, including the famed William Heberden at the Pennsylvania Hospital, which he helped found. In 1774, he founded the "Society for Inoculating the Poor Gratis", in order to help the poor people of Philadelphia afford inoculation. In his autobiography, Franklin writes:

"In 1736 I lost one of my sons, a fine boy of four years old, by the smallpox taken in the common way. I long regretted bitterly and still regret that I had not given it to him by inoculation. This I mention for the sake of the parents who omit that operation, on the supposition that they should never forgive themselves if a child died under it; my example showing that the regret may be the same either way, and that, therefore, the safer should be chosen."

Seven years after Francis' death, Deborah gave birth to Sarah, who was Franklin's only surviving, marital child. In 1772, Franklin's sister Jane Franklin Mecom wrote him with news of his grandsons. Franklin replied that it "brings often afresh to my mind the idea of my son Franky, though now dead thirty-six years, whom I have seldom since seemed equaled in everything, and whom to this day I cannot think of without a sigh."
