= William J. Duane =

American politician (1780–1865)

William Duane
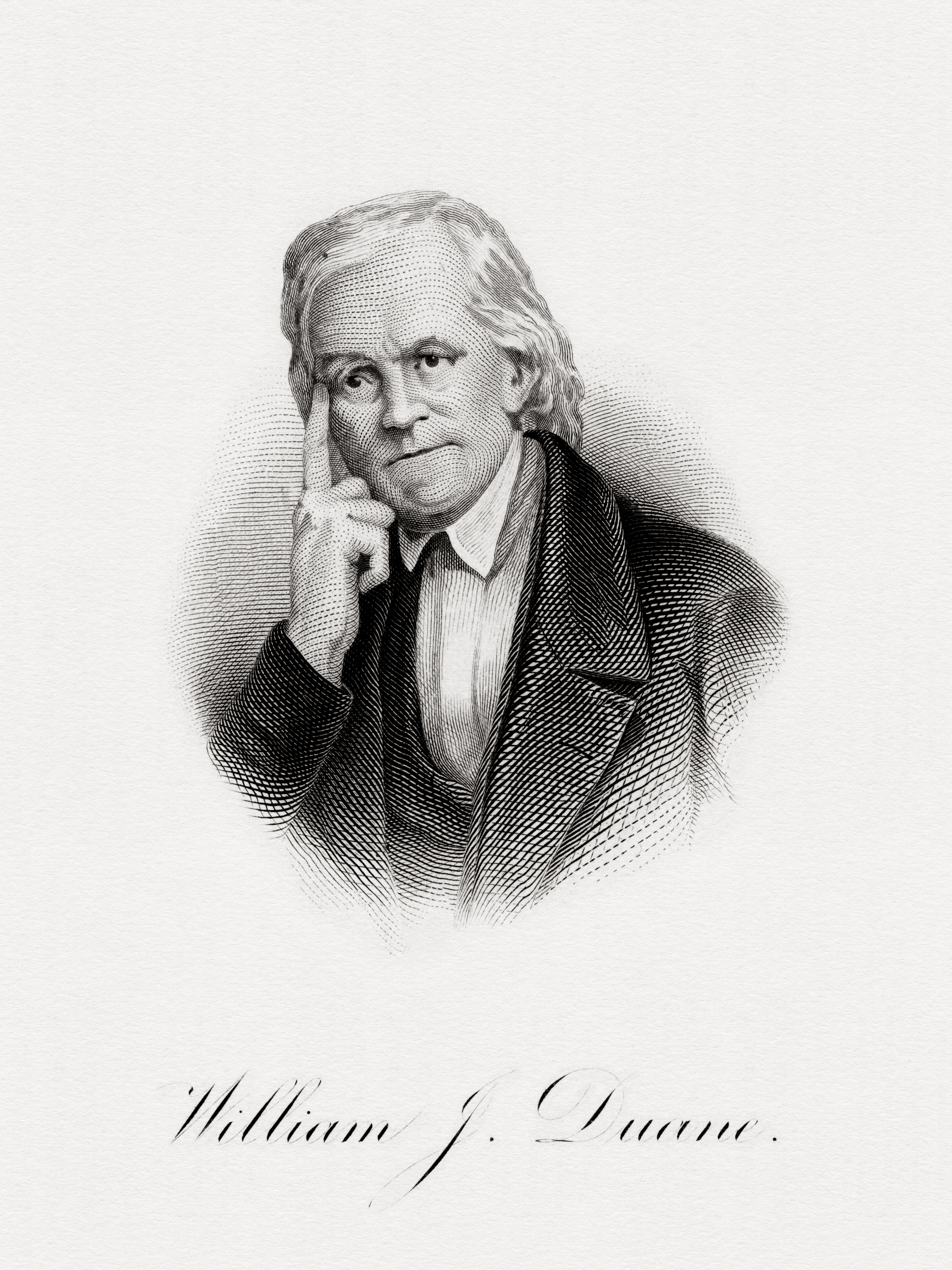

11th United States Secretary of the Treasury
- In office May 29, 1833 – September 22, 1833
- President: Andrew Jackson
- Preceded by: Louis McLane
- Succeeded by: Roger B. Taney

Personal details
- Born: May 9, 1780 Clonmel, Ireland
- Died: September 27, 1865 (aged 85) Philadelphia, Pennsylvania, U.S.
- Resting place: Laurel Hill Cemetery, Philadelphia, Pennsylvania, U.S.
- Party: Democratic-Republican (Before 1828); Democratic (1828–1865)
- Spouse: Deborah Franklin Bache

William John Duane (May 9, 1780 – September 27, 1865) was an American politician and lawyer from Pennsylvania.

Duane served a brief term as United States Secretary of the Treasury in 1833. His refusal to withdraw Federal deposits from the Second Bank of the United States led to his dismissal by President Andrew Jackson for which the president was censured. Duane was replaced by Roger B. Taney as Treasury Secretary.

== Early life ==
Duane was born on May 9, 1780, in Clonmel, County Tipperary, Ireland. Duane emigrated to the United States with his parents, William Duane, and Catherine Corcoran in 1796, settling in Philadelphia.

In Ireland, his father had apprenticed with a local paper, the Hibernian Advertiser, that supported the Volunteer movement for reform, and celebrated the American struggle for independence. Duane senior then produced his paper in East India Company administered Bengal, until deported by order of the Governor General. In London, he edited The Telegraph as an active member of the city's federation of democratic clubs, the London Corresponding Society and a United Irishman.

In Philadelphia, Duane assisted his father in publishing the Aurora, a pro-Jeffersonian Philadelphia newspaper, until 1806. He became an influential lawyer and served several terms in the Pennsylvania General Assembly, becoming one of the most powerful state politicians in Pennsylvania at the time.

== Marriage ==
He was married on December 31, 1805, in Philadelphia, Pennsylvania, to Deborah Franklin Bache, who was born on October 1, 1781, in Philadelphia, and died on February 12, 1863, in Philadelphia. His father-in-law was Richard Bache Sr., a marine insurance underwriter and importer in Philadelphia. Bache served as United States Postmaster General from 1776 to 1782. His mother-in-law was Sarah Franklin Bache, the daughter of Benjamin Franklin.

== Support for Andrew Jackson ==
Duane supported Jackson for president in 1824 and 1828. He declined appointments to serve as government director of the Second Bank of the United States and United States District Attorney.

== Secretary of the Treasury ==
In 1833, in the midst of the Bank War, President Andrew Jackson attempted to remove federal deposits from the Second Bank of the United States, whose money-lending functions were taken over by the legions of local and state banks that materialized across America, thus drastically increasing credit and speculation. Jackson's moves were greatly controversial. He removed his moderately pro-Bank Treasury Secretary Louis McLane, having him serve instead as Secretary of State, replacing Edward Livingston. On May 29, he replaced McLane with Duane. However, Duane also refused to remove the deposits. As a result, Jackson fired him in September. He replaced him with Attorney General Roger B. Taney, a strong opponent of the Bank. Under Taney, the deposits began to be removed.

Duane defended his own position in his book Narrative and Correspondence Concerning the Removal of the Deposites, and Occurrences Connected Therewith, published in 1838.

Jackson biographer James Parton heaps high praise upon Duane. He lauds the Treasury Secretary for refusing to yield to a position that he could not in good conscience accept, therefore preserving his integrity and honor. "In not yielding," Parton says, "he displayed a genuine moral heroism." Later Jackson biographer Robert V. Remini treats Duane far less favorably. He faults both Jackson and Duane for the turmoil that characterized Duane's brief time in office. He criticizes Jackson for not adequately screening Duane before nominating him, for allowing members of his administration to treat him poorly upon taking office, and for his dismissal of Duane. He continues:

But Duane is not without fault. When all is said and done, he placed his own judgment above that of the President. All because of wounded pride, he challenged not only Jackson's policy but his authority to make that policy. He was a small-minded, inconsequential bureaucrat, and he deserved to be sacked.

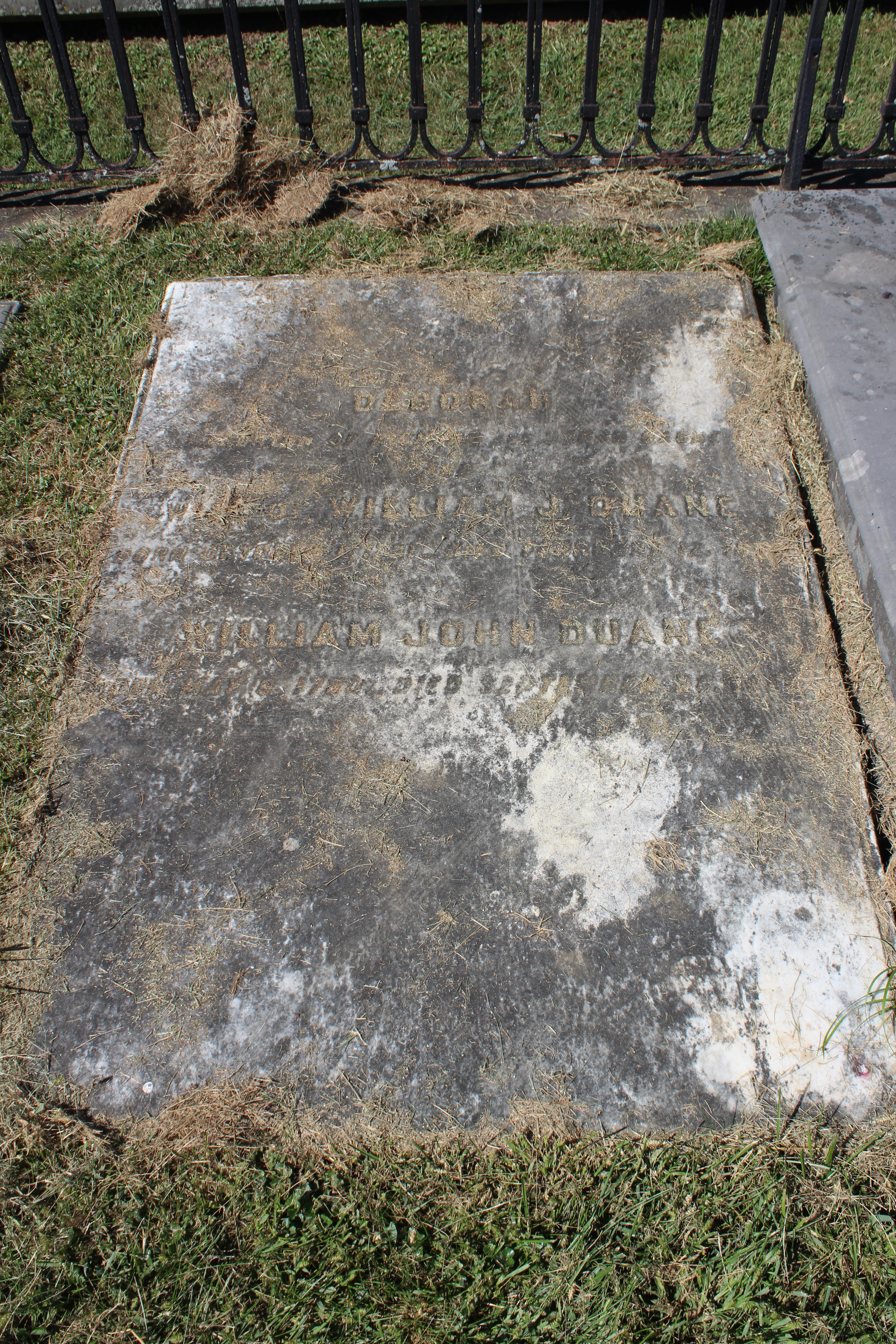
William J. Duane tombstone in Laurel Hill Cemetery

He died on September 27, 1865, in Philadelphia and was interred at Laurel Hill Cemetery.

== See also ==
- List of foreign-born United States Cabinet members

== Bibliography ==
- Bogart, Ernest Ludlow (1907). The Economic History of the United States. London, UK: Longmans, Green, and Company. p. 219. ISBN 978-1-176-58679-6.
- Kahan, Paul (2016). The Bank War: Andrew Jackson, Nicholas Biddle, and the Fight for American Finance. Yardley, PA: Westholme Publishing. pp. 116–120. ISBN 978-1594162343.
- Parton, James (1860). Life of Andrew Jackson, Volume 3. New York, NY: Mason Brothers.
- Phillips, Kim T. "William Duane, Philadelphia's Democratic Republicans, and the Origins of Modern Politics." Pennsylvania Magazine of History and Biography (1977): 365–387. online
- Remini, Robert V. (1967). Andrew Jackson and the Bank War. New York: W. W. Norton & Company. pp. 115–124. ISBN 978-0393097573.* Remini, Robert V. (1984). Andrew Jackson and the Course of American Democracy, 1833–1845. New York: Harper & Row Publishers, Inc. ISBN 0-8018-5913-1.
- Wilentz, Sean (2006). The Rise of American Democracy: Jefferson to Lincoln. New York, New York: W.W. Norton & Company, Inc. ISBN 0-393-05820-4.

Political offices
Preceded by Louis McLane	United States Secretary of the Treasury; 1833	Succeeded by Roger B. Taney
