= Sheona Macleod =

Scottish physician

Sheona Macleod is a Scottish physician. She was chair of the Conference of Postgraduate Medical Deans (COPMeD), lead for Health Education England’s deans, and the postgraduate medical dean in the East Midlands. In 2025, she is the director of education and training for NHS England. Macleod delivered the Royal College of General Practitioners' 2021 William Pickles Lecture, a lecture normally about medical education.

== Life ==
Macleod studied at the University of Glasgow, and trained as a GP in Paisley. Macleod has been a General Practitioner in Ashbourne, Derbyshire since 1989, and also worked as an occupational health advisor, a clinical assistant in a community hospital, and as a Medical Officer for Her Majesty's Prison Service. She was appointed GP dean for the East Midlands in 2009, and in 2012, was appointed Postgraduate Dean at East Midlands Healthcare Workforce Deanery, part of Health Education East Midlands. She led the Health Education England working group on enhancing the working lives of junior doctors. In 2017 she was appointed as Deputy to the National Medical Director. In 2025, she is now the National Director of education and training for NHS England.

Macleod cites Vicky Osgood, a clinician and educationalist, as her inspiration, in a Women in Medicine project by the Royal College of Physicians.

== Awards and honours ==
Macleod was awarded an honorary professorship from the University of Nottingham in 2016. In 2019, she was made an honorary fellow of FSEM.. She delivered the Royal College of General Practitioners' 2021 William Pickles Lecture, The Future Doctor — touching hearts and minds. She was awarded an honorary fellowship by the Academy of Medical Educators in 2021. In 2025, she was awarded Fellowship in surgery ad hominem by the Royal College of Surgeons of Edinburgh.
