= Osgoode =

- Osgoode Hall, building in Toronto, Canada
- Osgoode Hall Law School
- Osgoode Station, rapid transit station in Toronto
- Osgoode, Ontario
- Osgoode Township, Ontario, ward in Ottawa
- William Osgoode, first Chief Justice of Upper Canada

== See also ==
- Osgood (disambiguation)
