= Samuel Osgood House (North Andover, Massachusetts) =

Historic house in Massachusetts, United States

- U.S. National Register of Historic Places
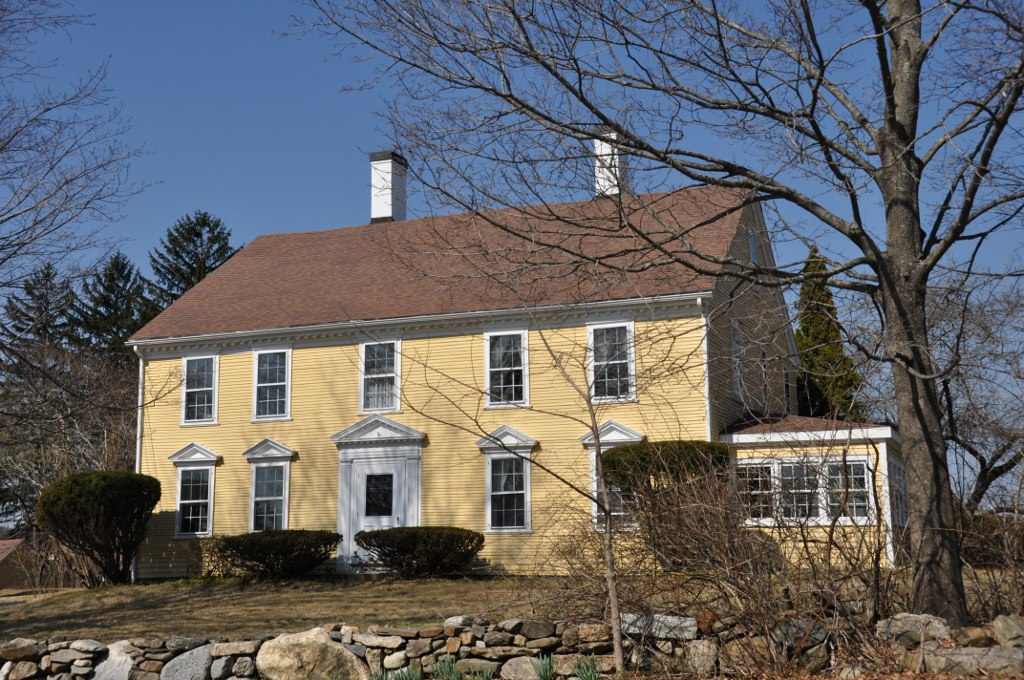

- Location within Massachusetts Location within the United States
- Location: 440 Osgood St., North Andover, Massachusetts
- Coordinates: 42°41′50″N 71°6′53″W
- Area: 5 acres (2.0 ha)
- Built: 1740
- Architectural style: Georgian
- NRHP reference No.: 74000380
- Added to NRHP: December 30, 1974

The Samuel Osgood House is a historic house in North Andover, Massachusetts, USA. Built about 1740, it is said to be the birthplace of Samuel Osgood (1747 – 1813), a member of the Continental Congress and the first United States Postmaster General. The house was listed on the National Register of Historic Places in 1974.

== Description and history ==
The Samuel Osgood House is located east of North Andover's town center, on the west side of Osgood Street, between Stevens Street and the Cochichewick River. It is a 2 1/2-story wood-frame structure, with a side-gable roof, two interior brick chimneys, and clapboarded exterior. Its main facade is five bays wide, with a center entrance flanked by pilasters and topped by an entablature and gabled pediment. The first-floor windows are topped by similar gables, while the second-floor windows have slightly projecting lintels. The building corners have plain cornerboards, rising to a dentillated cornice. The interior is organized in a center hall plan, with paneled fireplace surrounds. An ell extends to the rear, projecting slightly to the left, and there is a single-story porch projecting to the right.

The house was built about 1740, and is a good local example of mid-18th century Georgian architecture. Samuel Osgood was born in this house in 1747; he served in the Continental Army during the American Revolutionary War, and was elected to the Continental Congress in 1781. He was appointed the nation's first Postmaster General by President George Washington, and served in other civic roles prior to his death in 1813. His house is supposedly one of the places where the library of Harvard College was stored during the Revolution.

== See also ==
- National Register of Historic Places listings in Essex County, Massachusetts
