= Benjamin Franklin Bache (surgeon) =

American surgeon and Union Navy officer

Commodore Benjamin Franklin Bache
- Born: February 7, 1801; Monticello, Virginia
- Died: November 1, 1881 (aged 80); New York City
- Relatives: Richard Bache (grandfather)
- Military career
- Allegiance: United States of America
- Branch: United States Navy
- Service years: 1824–1868
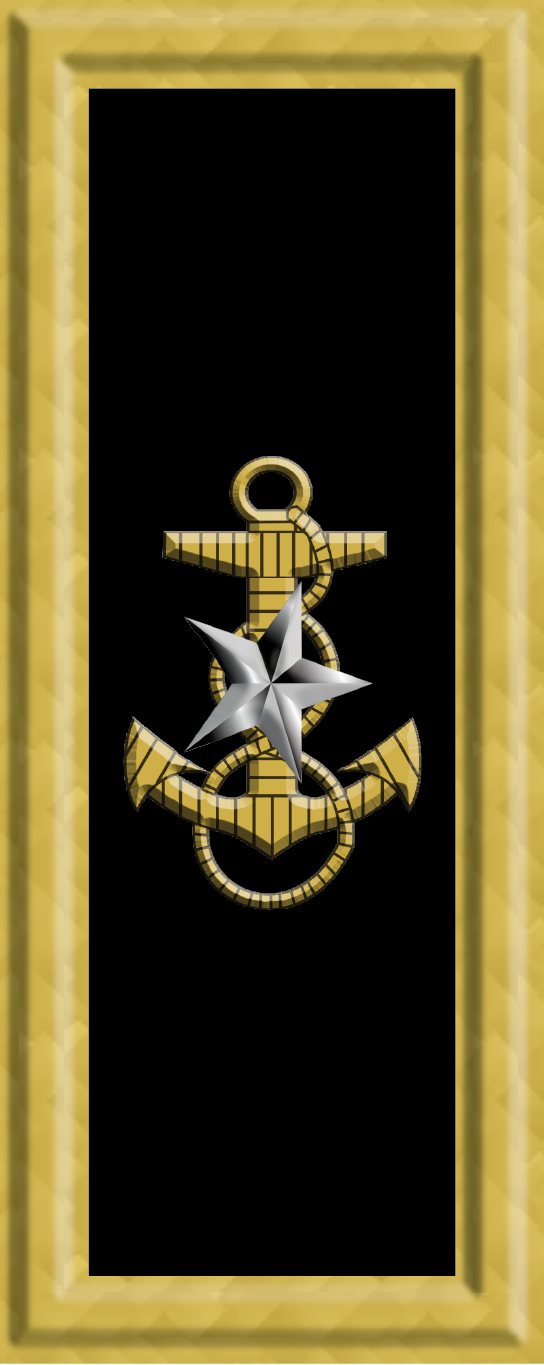
- Rank: Commodore
- Conflicts: American Civil War

Benjamin Franklin Bache (/ˈbiːtʃ/ BEECH; February 7, 1801 – November 1, 1881) was a surgeon in the United States Navy before and during the Civil War. He was a great-grandson of the Revolutionary War statesman and author Benjamin Franklin.

Bache was born in Monticello, Virginia, graduating from Princeton University in 1819, and from the medical department of the University of Pennsylvania in 1823.

He entered the Navy as an assistant surgeon in 1824, and in 1828 was promoted to the rank of surgeon. From 1838 to 1841 he served as fleet surgeon of the Mediterranean Squadron. simultaneously serving as professor of natural science at Kenyon College, Ohio.

Bache was in charge of the Philadelphia Naval Asylum from 1845 to 1847. He then served as fleet surgeon of the Brazil Squadron from 1848 to 1860, and at the Naval Hospital in New York from 1850 to 1854, serving as director of the medical laboratory of the Brooklyn Navy Yard from 1855 to 1872. During the Civil War, the laboratory provided medical supplies to the Union army. Bache retired on February 1, 1868, and in 1871 was appointed medical director with rank of Commodore.

Commodore Bache died at his home on 283 Henry Street, New York, after a short illness on November 1, 1881.

== See also ==
- Richard Bache, B.F. Bache's grandfather
