= Dauphin William Osgood =

American physician

- Born: November 5, 1845; Nelson, New Hampshire, United States
- Died: August 17, 1880 (aged 34) (Qing dynasty) Fuzhou, China

Dauphin William Osgood (Chinese: 柯為梁 or 柯為良; Pinyin: Kē Wéiliáng; Foochow Romanized: Kŏ̤ Ùi-liòng; November 5, 1845 – August 17, 1880) was an American Board medical missionary to China.

== Life ==
Dr. Dauphin William Osgood was born on November 5, 1845, in Nelson, New Hampshire, United States. In 1866 he study medicine in Bowdoin's Medical School, and later in New York University where he received his M.D. in 1869.

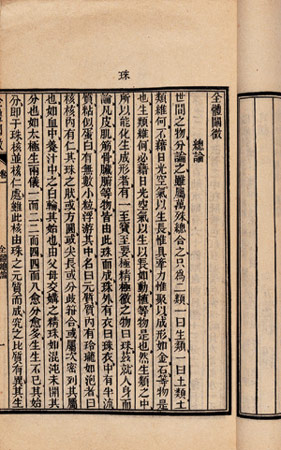
Osgood's five-volume translation of a standard work on anatomy, known in Chinese as 全體闡微.

After a short period of practice in his native town, Osgood came with his wife Helen W. Osgood to China as a medical missionary, arriving at Fuzhou on January 22, 1870. Upon his arrival he began practicing medicine part-time, while putting much of his energy in the study of the Chinese and the Fuzhou dialect, and very soon he mastered the language. He established the Foochow Medical Missionary Hospital near Ponasang, where he devoted much of his energy. In 1878 a new fifty-bed hospital at the Peace Street was completed with funds contributed by foreign businessmen and Chinese merchants and officials in Fuzhou, and the old building was turned into an opium asylum.

Osgood worked in Fuzhou for a little more than a decade until his own health broke down in the summer of 1880. During his ten years of labor he had given medical aid to 51,838 patients and about 1,500 opium smokers. On August 17, 1880, Osgood died of sunstroke at a sanitarium on Sharp Peak Island near the mouth of River Min. The day before his death he completed a five-volume translation of a standard work on anatomy into Chinese.

== Grave ==
Dr. Osgood was buried in the American Mission Cemetery in Fuzhou, near the corner of the grounds and close to the wall at the right of the cemetery gate. There was a white marble cross at the head, and the grave was surrounded by a black iron chain set in a low granite base. The English inscription on his tombstone read:

In the cross of Christ I glory
Dauphin William Osgood
Arrived at Fuzhou January 22, 1870
Died at Sharp Peak August 17, 1880
Erected by the foreign community of Fuzhou as a token of respects.

On the opposite side of the base stone was a quotation from Jeremiah 49:11,

Leave thy fatherless children. I will preserve them alive, and let the widows trust in me.

The Foochow Mission Cemetery was destroyed during Cultural Revolution.
