= William Macomb (merchant) =

Canadian politician

William Macomb (c. 1751 – April 16, 1796) was a British colonial merchant and fur trader in the Detroit, Michigan area before and after the American Revolutionary War. He got his start as a young man in the colony of New York. He was a brother of Alexander Macomb, and the two were partners in Detroit.

After the war, Macomb was elected as a member of the first parliament of Upper Canada in 1792, and he was the largest slaveholder in the area of Michigan at the time of his death. He died shortly before the British evacuated from Fort Detroit under the Jay Treaty, which was ratified in 1795.

== Early life ==
Macomb was born in County Antrim, northern Ireland around 1751, of Scots ancestry. He was the son of John Macomb, a merchant, and Jane Gordon. When he was a child, his family emigrated in 1755 to the colony of New York. They settled in Albany, where his father John Macomb was a merchant. With his older brother, Alexander, William also went into fur trading in upstate New York, dealing with the six nations of the Iroquois and other tribes around the southern part of the Great Lakes.

== Career in Detroit ==
In 1774 the brothers moved to Detroit (now Michigan, USA) as agents for Phyn & Ellice, fur traders in Schenectady, who sold them their stock for that site. Trading here since the 17th century, French Canadians were fiercely competitive in the area, but the young men felt they had a good start.

In 1776 the Macomb brothers purchased Grosse Ile from the Potawatomi Indians. The island was not settled by European Americans until after the war. During the American Revolutionary War, the Macombs continued to supply the British at Fort Detroit and the Indian Department, becoming wealthy and highly influential, and taking another partner.

Alexander Macomb returned to New York, settling in Manhattan before the end of the war. He became a very wealthy American land speculator, making profits from transactions in Georgia, North Carolina and Kentucky.

William Macomb continued to lead their business in the Detroit area, forming many connections with other British military and civil authorities. His trade with natives continued to include liquor. However, this was officially discouraged by local Catholic leaders and John Graves Simcoe, the first Lieutenant Governor of Upper Canada, the jurisdiction established in 1791 after the United States gained independence.

Macomb married Sarah Jane Dring, and they had at least eight children together. One account said that, after her death, he married a woman of the surname Gallant. Another said that Sarah Jane survived his death.

== Political activities ==
In July 1788, Macomb was appointed as a judge of the Court of Common Pleas for the District of Hesse. It was known as the Western District after 1792, when Upper Canada was established. The district covered not only present-day Western Ontario, but extended to the settlements at Detroit and Michilimackinac, which were also under British control at the time. The British vacated these areas in 1796.

In 1792, Macomb was elected to the 1st Parliament of Upper Canada; he was among three men elected from Detroit to this parliament. Together with François Baby, he represented Kent, serving until he died in 1796.

Macomb died at Detroit two months before the British evacuation of the fort in July 1796, following the settlement of the border between Canada and the United States by the Jay Treaty, which was ratified in 1795. Seven of his eight surviving children were still minors at that time.

With 26 slaves listed in his estate at the time of his death, Macomb was recorded as holding the most slaves of any person in what is now known as Michigan.

== Legacy ==
Macomb was survived by his wife Sarah and the following children: John W. (named after his father), Anne, Catherine, William, Sarah, Jane, David B., and Eliza. His widow and children continued to live in Detroit after his death, becoming Americans after changes under the Jay Treaty. All of these children except John W. Macomb were minors at the time of the June 1805 fire that destroyed Detroit, according to land board records.
