= Osgood (given name) =

Osgood is a masculine given name which may refer to:

== People ==
- Osgood Carleton (1741–1816), American cartographer, land surveyor, mathematics and navigation teacher and author
- Osgood T. Hadley (1838–1914), Union Army soldier in the American Civil War awarded the Medal of Honor
- Osgood Hanbury (1917–1943), British Royal Air Force Second World War flying ace
- Osgood Mackenzie (1842–1922), Scottish landowner and creator of a famous garden
- Osgood Perkins (1892–1937), American actor
- Oz Perkins (born 1974), American actor, screenwriter, and director, grandson of Osgood Perkins

== Fictional characters ==
- Osgood Conklin, a main character in the radio and television series Our Miss Brooks
- Osgood Fielding III, in the film Some Like It Hot

== See also ==
- Osgod Clapa (died 1054), Anglo-Saxon noble
