= Samuel Osgood House =

First U.S. Presidential Mansion in New York City

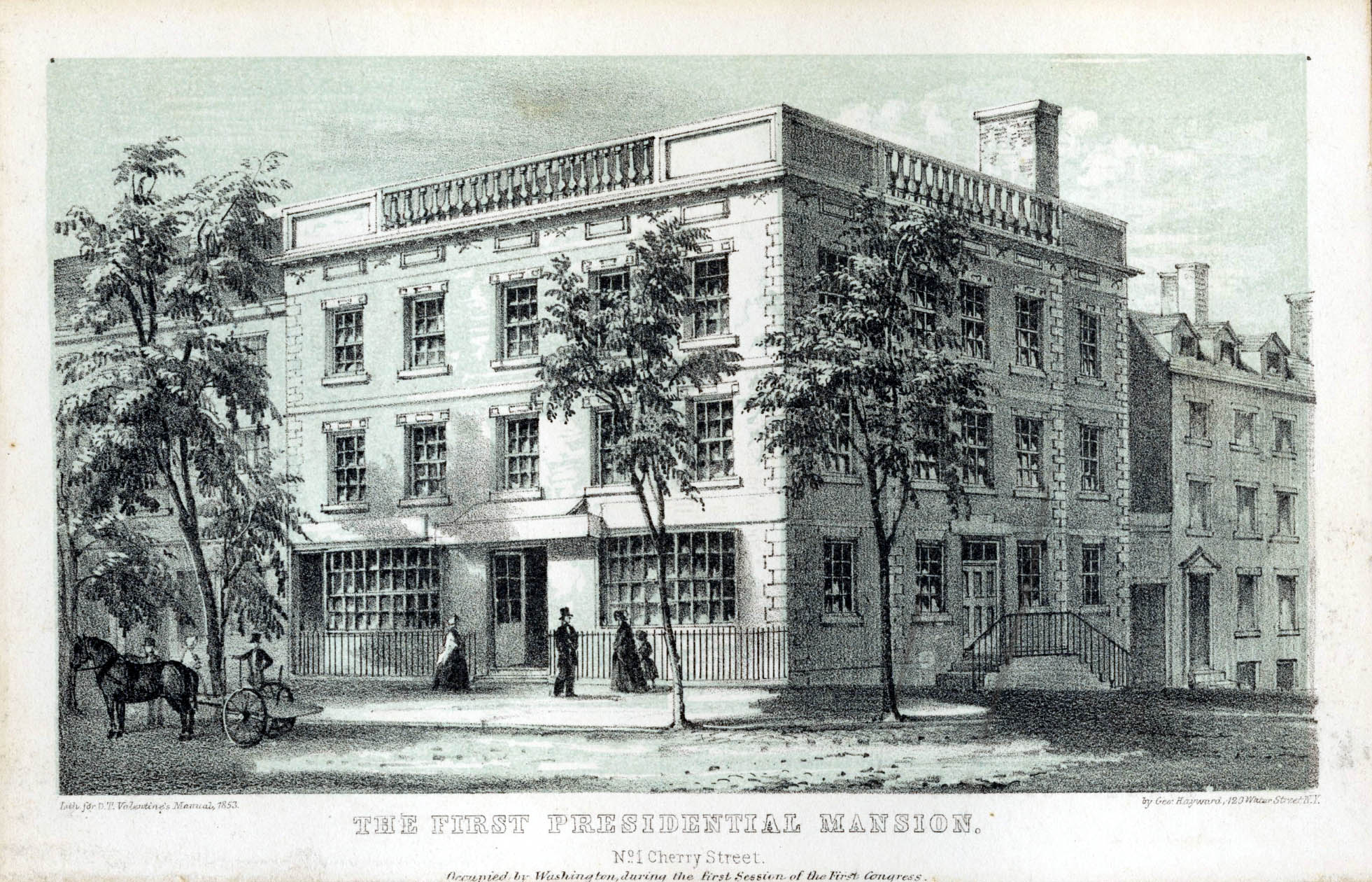
- The Samuel Osgood House

General information
- Location: 1 Cherry Street, New York City, United States
- Coordinates: 40°42′34.3″N 74°00′05.4″W
- Construction started: 1770
- Demolished: 1856
- Client: Walter Franklin

The Samuel Osgood House, also known as the Walter Franklin House, was the first official residence of the President of the United States. It housed George Washington, his family, household staff and slaves, from April 23, 1789, to February 23, 1790, during New York City's two-year term as the national capital. Demolished in 1856, it stood at the northeast corner of what was Pearl and Cherry (today Dover) streets in what is now Civic Center, Manhattan, New York City.

== Origin and use as presidential residence ==
The owner, Samuel Osgood, was a Massachusetts politician and lawyer, who settled in New York City. He married Maria Bowne Franklin, widow of Walter Franklin, the merchant who had built the house in 1770. Congress rented it for Washington's use, and the President-Elect moved in a week before his April 30, 1789, inauguration as first President of the United States. In addition to living quarters, the Osgood House contained the President's private office (the equivalent of the Oval Office) and the public business office (the equivalent of the West Wing), making it the first seat of the executive branch of the federal government.

The Samuel Osgood Papers, at the New York Historical Society, list purchases made to prepare the mansion for Washington occupancy.

I went the morning before the General's arrival to look at it. The best of furniture in every room, and the greatest quantity of plate and china I ever saw; the whole of the first and second stories is papered and the floors covered with the richest kinds of Turkey and Wilton carpets. There is scarcely anything talked about now but General Washington and the Palace.

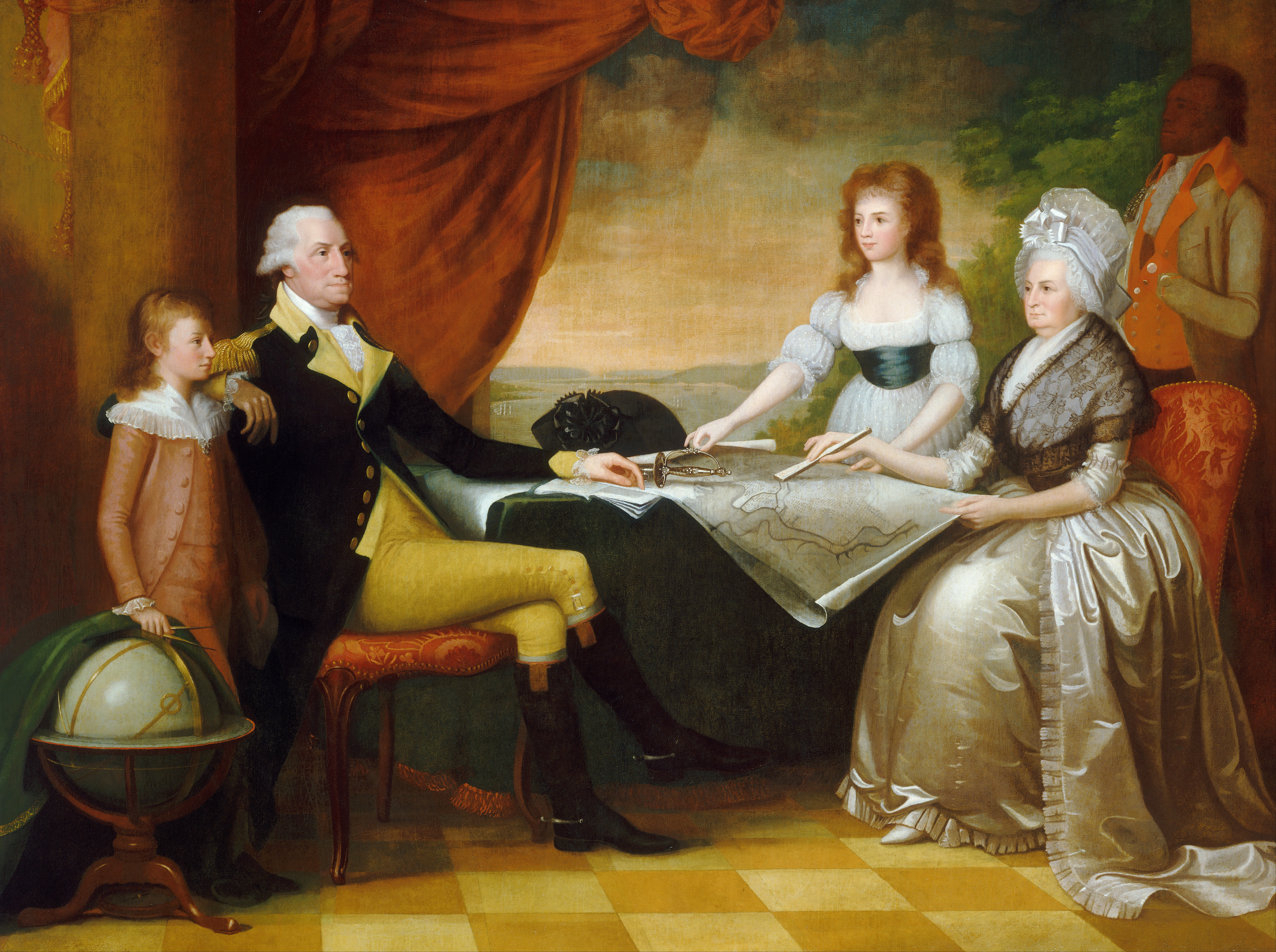
The Washington Family by Edward Savage (1789–1796). Savage painted this near-life-size group portrait from sketches he made at the Osgood House in December 1789 and January 1790.

Steward Samuel Fraunces, former owner of nearby Fraunces Tavern, managed a household staff of about 20: wage workers, indentured servants, and enslaved servants. Slavery was legal in New York, and Washington brought seven enslaved Africans from Mount Vernon to work in his presidential household: William Lee, Christopher Sheels, Giles, Paris, Austin, Moll, and Oney Judge.

Two of Martha Washington's grandchildren were part of the First Family: Nelly Custis (b. 1779) and "Wash" Custis (b. 1781).

Soon after his inauguration, Washington became seriously ill with a tumor on his thigh (possibly caused by anthrax poisoning). Cherry Street was cordoned off to prevent his being disturbed.

== Later years ==
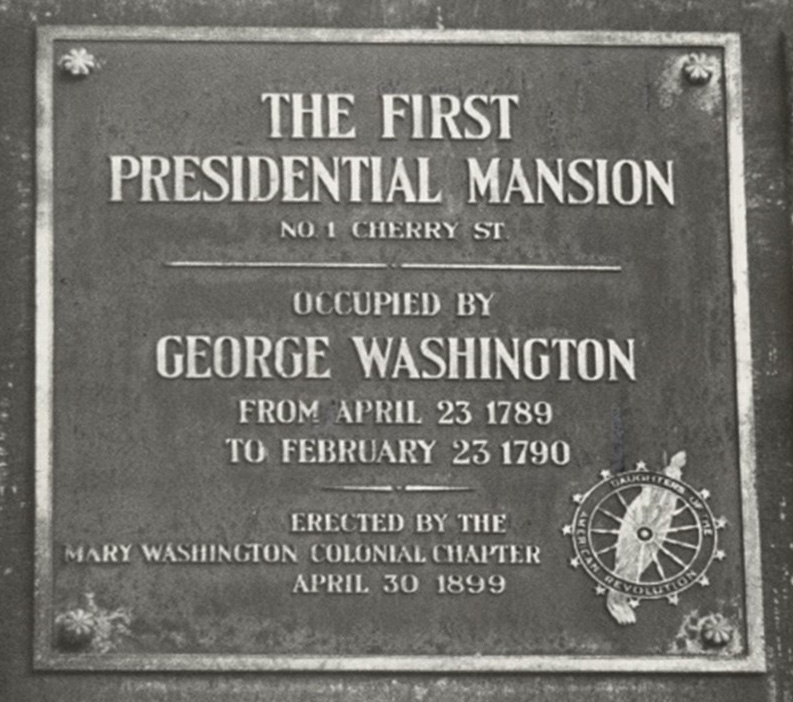
1899 DAR plaque

The house was rented for one year at an annual rent of $845, but the president vacated it after ten months when a larger residence became available. Washington moved to the Alexander Macomb House at 39–41 Broadway, which he occupied from February 23 to August 30, 1790.

Under the July 1790 Residence Act, the national capital moved to Philadelphia, Pennsylvania, for a 10-year period, while the permanent national capital was under construction in the District of Columbia.

The Osgood House was demolished in 1856. In 1899, the Daughters of the American Revolution marked its location with a bronze plaque, where Pearl Street crosses under the Brooklyn Bridge approach.

== See also ==
- Alexander Macomb House, second Presidential mansion
- President's House (Philadelphia), third Presidential mansion
- Germantown White House, twice temporarily occupied by President Washington
- White House/Executive Residence
- List of residences of presidents of the United States
