= Vicky Osgood =

British obstetrician and medical educator

Vicky Mary Osgood (1953 – 23 March 2017) was a British obstetrician and medical educator. She was a consultant in maternal–fetal medicine at Portsmouth, then dean of postgraduate medical education within the Wessex Deanery, and finally director of education and standards for the General Medical Council.

== Biography ==
Osgood graduated from the Royal Free Medical School in 1977 and began her training as an obstetrician in London hospitals. She also carried out research in reproductive endocrinology and fertility before moving to Oxford as a senior registrar and senior lecturer. There she worked for the Silver Star Society, a charity that funds hospital units for mothers with high-risk pregnancies. Later, she followed her husband to Portsmouth, where she was appointed a consultant in maternal–fetal medicine. After receiving a Diploma in Medical Education from the University of Wales, she became the deputy and then director of medical education for Portsmouth. She was involved in designing the obstetric and gynaecological unit as part of the Queen Alexandra Hospital redevelopment.

Osgood eventually left Portsmouth to take up a new role as dean of the Wessex Deanery, which oversees the postgraduate education and training of healthcare workers across Hampshire, Dorset, the Isle of Wight, South Wiltshire, and the Channel Islands. In 2011, she was appointed deputy director of education and standards for the General Medical Council, and promoted in 2015 to director of education and standards. She resigned in 2016 and died on 23 March 2017 from breast cancer.
