= Wainwright family =

American family

The Wainwright family is an American family of English descent that was prominent in the military and politics and, today, is prominent in the arts.

== History ==
On 5 June 1790, Peter Wainwright married Elizabeth Mayhew (daughter of Rev. Jonathan Mayhew and Elizabeth Clarke, daughter of John and wife Elizabeth (Breane) Clark). Elizabeth was born in 1759 and died 5 July 1829 in England. Peter was a tobacconist. He is said to have been a prosperous English merchant and came to Boston before the American Revolution. Peter and Elizabeth returned to England for the birth of their first son in 1791. They didn't return to Massachusetts until 11 years later.

Their children were:

- Peter Wainwright.
- Eliza Wainwright was born on 5 August 1794 in Liverpool, England and married on 6 September 1831 to Dr. Walter Channing.
- Jonathan Mayhew Wainwright I was born about 1791 and died 21 September 1854. He graduated from Harvard in 1812. He was inducted as minister of Episcopal Trinity Church (settlement No. 256 – 24 Nov. 1833 and left Feb. 1838). He married and fathered 14 children. One of them was Jonathan Mayhew Wainwright II.

- Jonathan Mayhew Wainwright II married Maria Page on 5 February 1844 in Clark Co., Virginia. He entered the U.S. Navy in 1837 as a midshipman. By the Civil War, he was a lieutenant and in 1862 was given his first command, the Harrett Lane, flagship of a mortar flotilla. He saw a lot of action in the Gulf of Mexico, off the coasts of Mississippi, Louisiana and Texas. He was wounded six times and finally died of a musket ball through his head. They had four children, including: Jonathan Mayhew Wainwright III, Robert Powell Page Wainwright.

- Jonathan Mayhew Wainwright III (1849–1870), United States Navy officer killed while fighting piracy, son of the civil war officer.
- Robert Powell Page Wainwright was a West Point graduate and cavalry officer in the Indian wars and was also stationed in Walla Walla, Washington. He also died fighting for his country. He was married to Josephine Serrell. Their children were: Jonathan Mayhew Wainwright IV and Helen Serrell Wainwright.

- Jonathan Mayhew Wainwright IV was born 1883 and died 1953. He is buried at Arlington National Cemetery. He married Adelle Holley. He was an army general in WWII and was nicknamed "Skinny". General Wainwright and Adelle had a son Jonathan Mayhew Wainwright V.

- Jonathan Mayhew Wainwright (1864–1945), United States Congressman, Army officer in the Spanish–American War and World War I, and United States Assistant Secretary of War from 1921 to 1923. Son of John Howard Wainwright (younger brother of the civil war officer) and Margaret Livingston Stuyvesant.

== Prominent members ==
- Jonathan Mayhew Wainwright I (c. 1791–1854), Episcopal minister
- Richard Wainwright (1817–1862), U.S. Naval Officer
- Jonathan Mayhew Wainwright II (1821–1863), U.S. Naval Officer
- Richard Wainwright (1849–1926), U.S. Naval Officer
- Evelyn Wotherspoon Wainwright (1853–1929), Suffragist and Washington hostess
- Jonathan Mayhew Wainwright (1864–1945), U.S. Congressman
- Richard Wainwright (1881–1944), U.S. Naval Officer
- Jonathan Mayhew Wainwright IV (1883–1953), U.S. Army Commander
- Carroll Livingston Wainwright (1899–1967), artist and socialite
- Stuyvesant Wainwright (1921–2010), U.S. Congressman
- Loudon Wainwright Jr. (1924–1988), writer
- Loudon Wainwright III (born 1946), songwriter and folk musician
- Sloan Wainwright (born 1957), artist, singer-songwriter
- Rufus Wainwright (born 1973), singer, songwriter, and composer
- Martha Wainwright (born 1976), singer-songwriter, musician, and actress
- Lucy Wainwright Roche (born 1981), singer-songwriter

== Family tree ==
Peter Wainwright | Elizabeth Mayhew
Jonathan Mayhew Wainwright I | Eliza Wainwright | Peter Wainwright
Jonathan Mayhew Wainwright II | Maria Page | John Howard Wainwright | Margaret Livingston Stuyvesant
Jonathan Mayhew Wainwright III | Robert Powell Page Wainwright | Josephine Serrell | Jonathan Mayhew Wainwright
Jonathan Mayhew Wainwright IV | Adelle Holley | Helen Serrell Wainwright
Jonathan Mayhew Wainwright V

== See also ==
- Saltonstall family
- Stuyvesant family
