= USS Wainwright (CG-28) =

Belknap-class destroyer leader

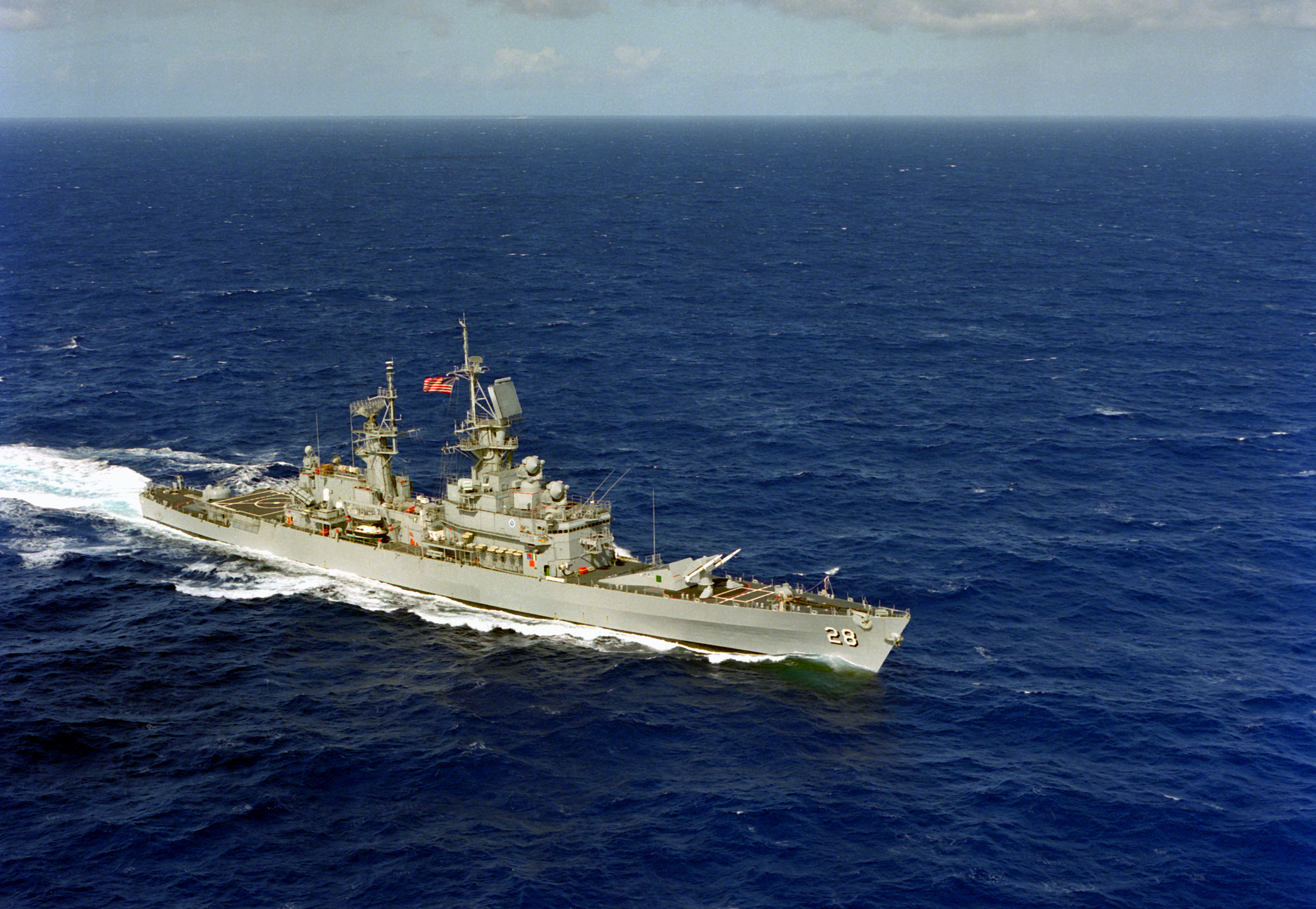
- USS Wainwright (CG-28)

History

United States
- Name: Wainwright
- Namesake: Jonathan Mayhew Wainwright (1821–1863); Jonathan Mayhew Wainwright (1849–1870); Richard Wainwright (American Civil War naval officer); Richard Wainwright (Spanish–American War naval officer); Richard Wainwright (Medal of Honor)
- Awarded: 18 May 1961
- Builder: Bath Iron Works
- Laid down: 2 July 1962
- Launched: 25 April 1965
- Sponsored by: Mrs. Richard W. Wainwright;
- Commissioned: 8 January 1966
- Decommissioned: 15 November 1993
- Reclassified: CG-28 30 June 1975
- Home port: Charleston, South Carolina
- Motto: "Battle Tested, Battle Proven"
- Fate: Sunk as target 12 June 2002 near Puerto Rico
- Notes: Participated in Operation Ivory Coast
- Badge

General characteristics
- Class & type: Belknap-class cruiser
- Displacement: 7,930 tons
- Length: 547 ft (167 m)
- Beam: 55 ft (17 m)
- Draft: 28 ft 10 in (8.79 m)
- Speed: 30 knots (30 mph; 60 km/h)
- Complement: 418
- Sensors & processing systems: AN/SPS-48E air-search radar; AN/SPS-49(V)5 air-search radar; AN/SPG-55B fire-control radar; AN/SPG-53F gun fire-control radar; AN/SQS-26 sonar
- Electronic warfare & decoys: AN/SLQ-32
- Armament: 1 × Mark 42 5-inch/54-caliber gun; 2 × 3-inch (76 mm) guns; 1 × Terrier missile / SM-2ER launcher; 6 × 15.5-inch (394 mm) torpedo tubes, Harpoon missiles, Phalanx CIWS

USS Wainwright (DLG/CG-28), was a Belknap-class destroyer leader of the United States Navy. It was the third Navy ship to be named for members of the Wainwright family; specifically, Commander Jonathan Mayhew Wainwright, his son, Master Jonathan Mayhew Wainwright Jr., and his cousin, Commander Richard Wainwright, as well as Rear Admiral Richard Wainwright, the son of Commander Richard Wainwright, and Commander Richard Wainwright, the son of Admiral Wainwright.

== Construction ==
Her keel was laid down on 2 July 1962 at Bath, Maine, by the Bath Iron Works Corporation. She was launched on 25 April 1965 as DLG 28 sponsored by Mrs. Richard W. Wainwright; and commissioned on 8 January 1966 at the Boston Naval Shipyard.

== Shakedown ==
Between January and May, the guided missile cruiser completed her outfitting at Boston, Massachusetts. On 21 May, she departed Boston, initially to test the Navy's newest sonar equipment and then to proceed to her home port, Charleston, South Carolina. During the months of June, July, and early August, she operated out of that port along the eastern seaboard and in the West Indies. During this period, she made six highly successful missile firings on the Atlantic Fleet weapon range and conducted a three-day search for an unidentified submarine contact. Though no positive identification of the submarine could be made, Wainwright did establish contact with her new long-range sonar and then tracked the vessel for a time.

On 13 August, the ship returned to Charleston for 15 days of upkeep in preparation for shakedown training, upon which she embarked on 28 August. At the conclusion of shakedown, she proceeded to Culebra Island for both gun and Terrier missile shoots. She returned to Charleston in October to prepare for the annual Atlantic Fleet exercise. On 28 November, the guided missile cruiser stood out of Charleston for 17 days of drills, including replenishment exercises, weapon coordination drills, and formation steaming maneuvers and tactics. She returned home on 16 December and ended the year in a leave and upkeep status.

== Vietnam War ==
On 6 January 1967, Wainwright got underway for Boston and post-shakedown availability. She concluded that repair period and headed back to Charleston on 15 March. Following local operations there, the guided missile destroyer embarked upon her first deployment to the western Pacific on 10 April. She transited the Panama Canal a week later and arrived in San Diego, California, on 23 April. For almost a month, she conducted exercises off the coast of southern California before heading west on 15 May. After brief stops at Pearl Harbor and Guam, Wainwright entered Subic Bay in the Philippines on 3 June.

Three days later, she arrived on station in the Tonkin Gulf and, on 8 June, took over positive identification radar advisory zone (PIRAZ) duties from Long Beach. In that capacity, Wainwright maintained constant radar and visual surveillance of the gulf and adjoining coasts for the purpose of identifying all aircraft in the zone and vectoring defensive forces to the interception of any possible airborne enemy intruders. Because of the relative immobility necessary to those duties, she also served as a reference point to guide American strike aircraft to their targets ashore. Since her duties afforded her a continual picture of the events occurring in the air over the zone, she also served as a base for search and rescue (SAR) helicopters. During that first line period, one SAR helicopter crashed Wainwright's flight deck area; but the damage proved to be minimal, and the destroyer was able to resume full-scale flight operations the following day. Damage to the superstructure of the helicopter storage compartment consisted of a gash provided by a helicopter blade. The helicopter was ordered to be pushed over the side as a result of the damage to it.

After a one-week upkeep period out of a scheduled two-week period at Sasebo, Japan, Wainwright was called back to PIRAZ duty secondary to a fire aboard USS Forrestal in July 1967. Wainwright resumed PIRAZ duty on 12 August. Her 27 days on station ended on 8 September when she cleared the gulf for a five-day visit to Hong Kong. On 15 September, she stood out of the British colony to return to Vietnamese waters. During that third and final tour, she served as a screen commander for two of the attack aircraft carriers operating on "Yankee Station" located in the southern reaches of the Tonkin Gulf as well as antiaircraft warfare command ship for all of Task Force (TF) 77. On 28 September, Wainwright completed her final assignment in the combat zone and departed the Tonkin Gulf. En route home, she visited Subic Bay; Sydney, Australia; Wellington, New Zealand; and Tahiti. The warship retransited the Panama Canal on 12 November and reentered Charleston four days later.

The guided missile destroyer ended 1967 and began 1968 at Charleston. On 19 January 1968, she exited her home port and headed for Newport, Rhode Island, where she served as school ship for the Destroyer School from 21 January to 3 February before returning to Charleston on 5 February. Her operations from her home port, including Operation "Rugby Match" exercises in the West Indies, lasted until she sailed for the western Pacific on 24 June. The warship transited the Panama Canal on 29 June, stopped briefly at Pearl Harbor from 11 to 15 July and at Guam on 21 July, and arrived at Subic Bay on 26 July. Four days later, she embarked upon the first tour of combat duty of her 1968 deployment. She stopped at Da Nang for briefings on 2 August and then relieved Sterett on PIRAZ station on 4 August. During the following 41 days, she left her station only once – to evade a typhoon – and returned immediately after the storm passed. On 14 September, she turned PIRAZ duties back over to Sterett and steamed off for a month of port visits which included a brief upkeep period at Subic Bay followed by calls at Hong Kong and Yokosuka. On 13 October, she headed from Japan directly to the PIRAZ station and relieved Sterett once more. The 27 days of her second line period passed even more routinely than those of the first, and she cleared the Tonkin Gulf on 15 November for a four-day upkeep in Sasebo from 19 to 23 November. Back on station on 28 November, Wainwright concluded the year as the Navy's air coordinator in the northern portion of the Tonkin Gulf.

The warship spent the first three days of 1969 winding up her third and final tour of duty as PIRAZ ship and then set a course for the Philippines, the first pause on her way home. After stopping at Subic Bay from 5 to 9 January, she continued her roundabout voyage to Charleston, stopping along the way at Sydney, Australia; Auckland, New Zealand; and Papeete, Tahiti. She passed back through the Panama Canal on 11 February, stopped at St. Thomas for a two-day visit on 15 February, and reached Charleston on 21 February.

Following a month of leave and upkeep, Wainwright underwent a whole series of inspections at Charleston that spring. During the middle of May, she steamed north to Norfolk, Virginia, where she participated in the Presidential Seapower Demonstration conducted in the Virginia Capes operating area. At the conclusion of that event on 19 May, she headed south for the multifaceted combat exercise, "Exotic Dancer." For the first two weeks of June, Wainwright remained in the West Indies and participated in the NATO anti-submarine warfare exercise, "Spark Plug", along with ships of the navies of Canada, Great Britain, the Netherlands, and Portugal. That exercise ended on 11 June, and the destroyer proceeded to Newport where she disembarked the Commander, Cruiser-Destroyer Flotilla 2. She returned to Charleston on 16 June and spent all but two days of the next two months in port. On 18 August, Wainwright entered the Charleston Naval Shipyard for her first regular overhaul.

On 16 February 1970, the ship returned to operational status. Training off the Florida coast followed by more of the same off the Virginia Capes occupied her until mid-March. After three days in Charleston, Wainwright got underway for gunnery and missile shoots on the Atlantic Fleet weapons range near Puerto Rico. Refresher training out of Guantanamo Bay followed in April, but it was interrupted by two special assignments. On 26 April, she received orders to intercept three Haitian Coast Guard vessels fleeing that country in the wake of an unsuccessful coup. The ship encountered one near the entrance to Guantanamo Bay; but, observing American port officials boarding the ship peacefully, she continued on her way. Later, Wainwright found the other two ships and escorted them back to Guantanamo Bay for temporary asylum. On 10 May, she put to sea to intercept quite a different force – a Soviet task group. That night, she came upon two of the Russian ships, a guided missile cruiser and a guided missile destroyer. The following day, two submarines, an oiler, and a submarine tender rendezvoused with the first two ships; and all six entered port at Cienfuegos, Cuba, on 14 May. The next day, Wainwright returned to Guantanamo Bay to resume refresher training. Less than a month later, on 12 June, she moored at Charleston for two months of upkeep and training in preparation for her forthcoming deployment to the Far East.

On 25 August, the guided missile destroyer stood out of Charleston, bound for her third and final deployment to the western Pacific in conjunction with the Vietnam War. Steaming via the Panama Canal and Pearl Harbor, she arrived in Yokosuka, Japan, on 21 September. For almost two months, she conducted operations in Japanese waters, primarily bilateral ASW exercises in the Sea of Japan with units of the Japanese Maritime Self Defense Force. Periodically, the warship put into Yokosuka and Sasebo for upkeep and liberty.

Wainwright departed from Japan on 14 November and headed via the Taiwan Strait for the Tonkin Gulf. On 20 November, she relieved Jouett on PIRAZ station and took up familiar duty as the American air coordinator in the northern part of the gulf. That assignment proved very brief for, on the following day, Chicago relieved Wainwright; and the guided missile frigate moved on to new duties as the coordinator ship assigned to the north SAR station. For almost a month, she alternated between north and south SAR stations, taking time briefly in mid-December to participate in Operation "Beacon Tower", a three-day exercise to test the readiness of American warships in the Tonkin Gulf to meet and deal with air and surface attacks. On 16 December, Wainwright left the combat zone, bound for Singapore, where she remained from 19 to 26 December. From there, she set a course for the Philippines and arrived in Subic Bay on 29 December.

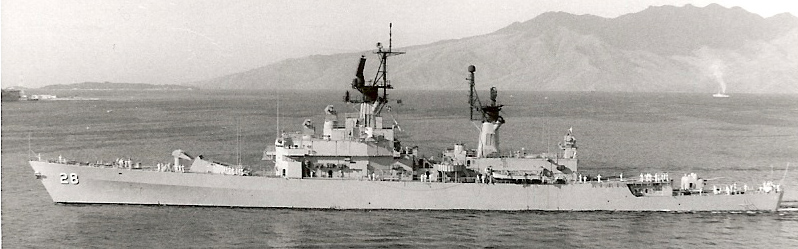
Wainwright during third Vietnam War deployment.

The warship completed six days in port at Subic Bay on 4 January 1971 and got underway for Hong Kong. She returned briefly to Subic Bay, however, for repairs to one of her radar antennae but finally reached Hong Kong on 11 January. Following a four-day visit, she stood out of the British colony on her way to the Tonkin Gulf. She served 16 days in the gulf, dividing her time between PIRAZ duties and assignments as the northern SAR ship.

After a final two-day stop at Subic Bay, Wainwright began the long voyage back to Charleston which took her through the Indian Ocean, around the Cape of Good Hope, and across the southern Atlantic to complete her first circumnavigation of the globe. Along the way, she made a series of calls at African and South American ports, beginning with Djibouti in French Somaliland. From there, she headed for Massawa, Ethiopia, where she participated in the celebration of the Ethiopian Navy Day, during which she joined ships of other nations in observing the graduation of midshipmen from the Ethiopian Naval Academy and hosted then-Emperor Haile Selassie I on board. She rounded out her African itinerary with calls at Diego Suarez, Madagascar, and at Lourenço Marques, Mozambique, before rounding the cape and heading across the Atlantic toward Brazil. Visits to Rio de Janeiro and Recife in Brazil and at St. Thomas in the Virgin Islands preceded gunfire support training and a missile shoot at Culebra Island. On 2 April, Wainwright steamed into Charleston and began an extended standdown period.

Wainwright received four battle stars for service in the Vietnam War.

== Post-Vietnam service ==
Upon completion of a 59-day post-deployment stand-down, Wainwright resumed operations early in June as a unit of the Atlantic Fleet Cruiser-Destroyer Force. She spent much of June in the Caribbean Sea undergoing gunnery and missile training and returned to Charleston on 19 June. Four days later, work began on the installation of a Light Airborne Multi-Purpose System (LAMPS). Those modifications were completed by mid-July, and Wainwright occupied the following four months with operations along the eastern seaboard in conjunction with the initial evaluation of her LAMPS helicopter. A tender availability followed by the conversion of her propulsion plant to burn Navy distillate fuel brought the year to a close at Charleston. The warship completed the conversion on 11 January 1972 and had resumed operations at sea out of Charleston by 24 January. For the next nine months, she tested her new LAMPS installation, made port visits to Atlantic and gulf coast ports, and participated in the usual Second Fleet exercises. Those duties took her from the southeastern coast of Texas to the West Indies and thence as far north as Maine. By late November, she was at Charleston preparing for her first tour of duty in the Mediterranean Sea.

On 1 December, Wainwright stood out of Charleston and set a course for Rota, Spain, where she arrived on 10 December. After changing operational control from the Second Fleet to the Sixth Fleet, the guided missile destroyer departed Rota on 11 December and entered the Mediterranean Sea. Conducting ASW and antiair warfare (AAW) exercises, the warship headed across the Mediterranean, stopping at Barcelona from 20 to 26 December and arriving in Naples, Italy, on 30 December. She departed that port on 6 January 1973, and headed for the Ionian Sea. During ASW exercises in Greek waters, Wainwright contacted, tracked, and positively identified four Soviet submarines in spite of their strenuous efforts to evade.

Upon completing those exercises, she headed for the southern coast of France, arriving in Marseille on 17 January for a two-day visit. More AAW exercises followed, as did port visits to Palma de Mallorca, Málaga, and Genoa. On 17 February, she departed Genoa in company with the Italian cruiser Vittorio Veneto to participate in National Week XV, a multinational naval exercise of broad scope conducted across the Central Mediterranean. In addition to the Americans and Italians, units of the Greek and Turkish navies also participated in drills and battle exercises extending westward from Crete to the Strait of Messina between Sicily and the toe of the Italian boot.

After National Week XV, Wainwright punctuated a series of Sixth Fleet ASW and AAW exercises with visits to many of the ports already mentioned as well as at Athens, Civitavecchia, Livorno, and Golfe Juan. On 17 June, she steamed from Palma de Mallorca through the Strait of Gibraltar to Rota on the Atlantic coast of Spain. There, she turned her duties over to Belknap on 21 June.

That same day, she departed Rota for Lisbon, where she joined Guam and Bowen in preparation for a transatlantic exercise to test the concept of the sea control ship. The three warships departed Lisbon on 28 June. The exercise lasted from 28 June to 8 July, during which time Wainwright vectored Guam-based Harrier II aircraft to the interception of two Soviet "Bear" aircraft. Just before the conclusion of the exercise on 8 July, Wainwright ventured across the Arctic Circle briefly before setting a course for Charleston. The guided missile destroyer concluded her first Mediterranean deployment on 20 July and began her standdown period at Charleston. On 10 September, she entered the Charleston Naval Shipyard for her second regular overhaul.

Wainwright completed sea trials, the final phase of overhaul, between 10 and 14 June 1974 and officially rejoined the Atlantic Fleet on 20 June at the Charleston Naval Station. For the remainder of the year, the warship was busy with refresher training, a myriad of tests, qualifications, inspections, and evaluations, and other normal Second Fleet operations conducted along the southern Atlantic coast and in the Caribbean. The beginning of 1975 brought another period in drydock, this time at the Norfolk Naval Shipyard, for repairs to her sonar dome. She returned to Charleston on 1 February 1975 and resumed tests and inspections in preparation for her second deployment to European waters.

On 5 March, she stood down the Cooper River on her way to Europe. En route to the Mediterranean, the guided missile destroyer joined Forrestal and Tunny in a series of ASW, surface, and air action drills, at the conclusion of which Wainwright continued on her way to Spain.

She changed operational control to the Sixth Fleet while at Rota between 15 and 17 March. The warship entered the "middle sea" on the latter date and arrived in Naples, her first Mediterranean port of call, on 22 March. As during her previous Mediterranean cruise, she engaged in one training exercise after another, but interrupted that schedule almost as frequently for port calls all along the Mediterranean coast of Europe. Late in April, a missile-firing exercise was interrupted by a snoopy Soviet destroyer and had to be postponed until the following day.

June proved to be an important month in Wainwright's history, for it was during the latter part of that month that she transited the Straits of the Bosphorus and the Dardanelles into the Black Sea and became the first American ship to visit Romania, at the port city of Constanţa, in 49 years. After concluding that visit on 24 June and passing back into the Mediterranean on 25 June, she conducted a brief surveillance of the Soviet helicopter carrier Leningrad before resuming her schedule of training exercises and port visits. On 30 June, Wainwright was redesignated a guided missile cruiser, CG-28. Her second tour of duty with the Sixth Fleet lasted until late August. On 22 August, she made a one-day stop at Rota; then headed home. Nine days later, she moored at Charleston and, for the remainder of the year, resumed a routine of Second Fleet operations, inspections, and upkeep.

Following a spring of special operations and underway training out of Charleston, Wainwright got underway on 30 June 1976 for New York City in anticipation of two events that year: the International Naval Review and Operation "Sail", both in honor of the United States' Bicentennial birthday. To the guided missile cruiser went the signal honor of being the focal point of both events, serving as flagship for the naval review and as reviewing ship for Operation "Sail." During her service in those two capacities, she entertained Vice President of the United States Nelson D. Rockefeller, Secretary of State Henry Kissinger, Secretary of Defense Donald Rumsfeld, Admiral James L. Holloway III, Chief of Naval Operations, and Admiral Shanahan, Commander, Second Fleet. On 6 July, the ship departed New York and headed back to Charleston to resume her routine schedule of special operations and training cruises until the following spring.

On 31 March 1977, Wainwright embarked upon her third deployment to the Mediterranean. She joined the Sixth Fleet officially upon arrival in Rota on 12 April and actually entered the Mediterranean the following day. Port visits and an almost incessant schedule of training exercises – ASW drills, AAW practice, missile shoots, multinational and bilateral exercises – occupied her once again. During June, she visited the Black Sea once more, but otherwise, her routine was similar to that she had experienced in previous tours of duty with the Sixth Fleet. She concluded her Mediterranean operations at Rota at the end of the first week in October and arrived back in Charleston on 21 October. For the remaining two months of 1977, typical Second Fleet operations out of Charleston filled her schedule.

January 1978 was spent in grooming for a multi-threat training exercise, "READEX 1-78", which took place in February in the southern Florida and Caribbean operating areas. Returning to Charleston late in the month, Wainwright entered the Charleston Naval Shipyard on 23 February for the commencement of a scheduled 13-month overhaul which concluded in March 1979.

== Operation Praying Mantis ==
On 18 April 1988, Wainwright participated in Operation Praying Mantis. Operation Praying Mantis was the 18 April 1988 action waged by U.S. naval forces in retaliation for the Iranian mining of an American warship.

The 14 April mining nearly sank the guided missile frigate USS Samuel B. Roberts, which was sailing in the Persian Gulf as part of Operation Earnest Will, the 1987-88 convoy missions in which U.S. warships escorted reflagged Kuwaiti oil tankers to protect them from Iranian attacks.

After the mining, U.S. Navy divers recovered other mines in the area. The serial numbers matched those of mines seized along with the Iran Ajr the previous September.

By the time Roberts was towed to Dubai on 15 April, battered but saved with no loss of life, U.S. planning for the retaliatory operation had already begun in Washington and in the Middle East.

The battle, the largest for American surface forces since World War II, sank two Iranian warships and as many as six armed speedboats. It also marked the first surface-to-surface missile engagement in U.S. Navy history.

The attack by the U.S. helped pressure Iran to agree to a ceasefire with Iraq later that summer, ending the eight-year conflict between the Persian Gulf neighbors.

On 18 April 1988, the Americans responded with several groups of surface warships, plus airplanes from the carrier USS Enterprise. The action began with coordinated strikes by two surface groups. One group, consisting of two destroyers and the amphibious transport dock USS Trenton, attacked the Sassan oil platform while the other, which included the guided missile cruiser, Wainwright and two frigates, attacked the Sirri oil platform. U.S. Marines from Marine Air-Ground Task Force (MAGTF) 2-88 fast-roped onto the Sassan platform, gathered intelligence, and set explosives to disable it.

Iran responded by dispatching Boghammar speedboats to attack various targets in the Persian Gulf, including an American-flagged supply ship and a Panamanian-flagged ship. After these attacks, A-6E Intruder aircraft from VA-95 were vectored in on the speedboats by an American frigate. The two aircraft, dropped Rockeye II cluster bombs on the speedboats, sinking one and damaging several others.

Action continued to escalate. Joshan, an Iranian Kaman-class (La Combattante II type) fast attack craft, challenged Wainwright and her surface group, firing a Harpoon missile at Wainwright. Wainwright responded to the challenge by firing four Standard missiles. After damage assessment of Joshan, USS Bagley fired one Harpoon missile at Joshan; however, Joshan's superstructure had been destroyed by the previous attacks, so the missile did not strike the target. The three ships of Surface Action Group Charlie closed on Joshan, destroying it with naval gunfire.

Fighting continued when the Iranian frigate Sahand departed Bandar Abbas and challenged elements of an American surface group. She was observed by two VA-95 A-6Es while they were flying surface combat air patrol for USS Joseph Strauss.

Sahand launched missiles at the A-6Es, and the Intruders replied with launches of two Harpoons and four laser-guided Skipper bombs. This was followed by a Harpoon firing from Joseph Strauss. The weapons delivered against Sahand were successful and the ship was sunk.

By the end of the operation, elements of the American fleet had damaged Iranian naval and intelligence facilities on two inoperable oil platforms in the Persian Gulf and sunk several armed Iranian speedboats. Sablan was repaired in 1989 and has since been upgraded and is still in service with the Iranian navy. In short, Iran suffered one major warship lost, one major warship damaged, and a smaller gunboat lost. Damage to the infrastructure of the two oil platforms forced their demolition after the war. The site was built up again for oil production by French and Russian oil companies, after buying the drilling rights from the Iranian government.

The U.S. side took two casualties: the aircrew of a Marine Corps AH-1T Sea Cobra gunship. The Cobra, attached to USS Trenton, was flying reconnaissance from Wainwright and crashed sometime after dark about 15 miles (24 km) southwest of Abu Musa island. Two bodies were recovered by Navy divers in May, and the wreckage of the helicopter was raised later that month. Navy officials said it showed no sign of battle damage, though the aircraft could have crashed while trying to evade Iranian fire.

The guided missile cruiser USS Vincennes was called to protect the extraction of Roberts and arrived a month later. The heightened tensions contributed to the crew of Vincennes mistakenly shooting down a commercial airliner on a routine flight, Iran Air Flight 655, killing all 290 crew and passengers on 3 July, less than 2 months after their arrival.

Operation Praying Mantis is one of five American naval engagements cited by United States Naval Academy Prof. Craig L. Symonds in his book Decision at Sea (2005) as being decisive in establishing U.S. naval superiority. The others were the Battle of Lake Erie (1813), the Battle of Hampton Roads (1862), the Battle of Manila Bay (1898), and the Battle of Midway (1942).

On 6 November 2003, the International Court of Justice dismissed Iran's claim for reparation against the United States for breach of the 1955 Treaty of Amity between the two countries. The court also dismissed a counter-claim by the United States, also for reparation for breach of the same treaty. As part of its finding the court did note that "the actions of the United States of America against Iranian oil platforms on 19 October 1987 (Operation Nimble Archer) and 18 April 1988 (Operation Praying Mantis) cannot be justified as measures necessary to protect the essential security interests of the United States of America." The Court also ruled that it, "...cannot however uphold the submission of the Islamic Republic of Iran that those actions constitute a breach of the obligations of the United States of America under Article X, paragraph 1, of that Treaty, regarding freedom of commerce between the territories of the parties, and that, accordingly, the claim of the Islamic Republic of Iran for reparation also cannot be upheld;"

== Fate ==
Wainwright was decommissioned on 10 November 1993 and was mothballed for most of a decade. On 11 June 2002 ex-Wainwright was used as a live fire target and struck by two Harpoon missiles from HMS Richmond. Remaining afloat overnight, she was attacked the next day by Royal Navy attack submarine HMS Tireless, which hit Wainright with a Spearfish torpedo, severing the bow. US aircraft then attacked her before she was scuttled with explosive charges.

== In popular culture ==
In the Tom Clancy novel Red Storm Rising, USS Wainwright is sunk by 2 AS-4 missiles launched by a Soviet bomber while part of an amphibious group involved in the recovery of Iceland from a Soviet invasion, it splits in two and sinks.
