= USS Wainwright =

Three ships of the United States Navy have been named USS Wainwright.

The first ship was named for Commander Jonathan Mayhew Wainwright II, his son, Master Jonathan Mayhew Wainwright III, and his cousin, Commander Richard Wainwright. Wainwright (DD-419) honored these three officers as well as Rear Admiral Richard Wainwright, the son of Commander Richard Wainwright. Wainwright (DLG-28) honored the previous four Wainwrights and Commander Richard Wainwright, the son of Admiral Wainwright.

- The first Wainwright (DD-62) was a Tucker-class destroyer launched in 1916 and struck in 1934.
- The second Wainwright (DD-419) was a Sims-class destroyer, commissioned in 1940 and decommissioned in 1946.
- The third Wainwright (DLG-28) was a Belknap-class destroyer leader, commissioned 1966 and decommissioned in 1993.
