= Corsair II =

Corsair II may refer to one of the following:

- Corsair II, second of the large yachts built by J. P. Morgan that saw service as USS Gloucester in the Spanish–American War.
- Ling-Temco-Vought A-7 Corsair II, a U.S. Navy Vietnam war era aircraft.
