= Jonathan Mayhew Wainwright (bishop) =

English bishop

The Right Reverend Jonathan Mayhew Wainwright I D.D., D.C.L.
- 5th Bishop of New York
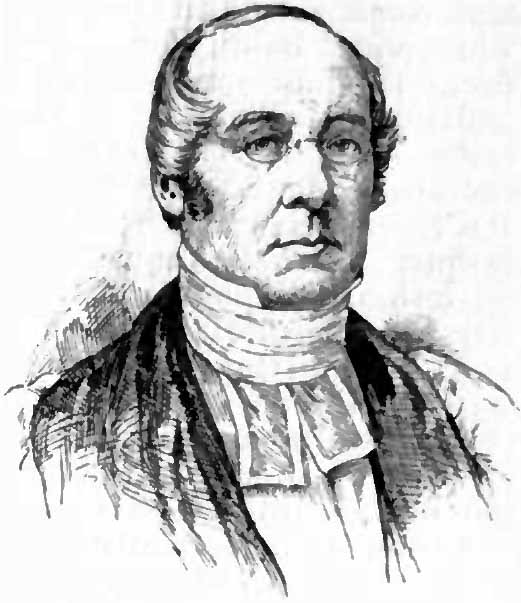
- Wainwright circa 1840-1850
- Church: Episcopal Church
- Diocese: New York
- Elected: October 1, 1852
- In office: 1852–1854
- Predecessor: Benjamin T. Onderdonk
- Successor: Horatio Potter

Orders
- Ordination: May 29, 1818 by John Henry Hobart
- Consecration: November 10, 1852 by Thomas Church Brownell

Personal details
- Born: February 24, 1792 Liverpool, England
- Died: September 21, 1854 (aged 62) New York City, New York, United States
- Buried: Trinity Church Cemetery
- Denomination: Anglican
- Parents: Peter Wainwright; Elizabeth Mayhew
- Spouse: Amelia Maria Phelps (m. 1818)
- Children: 14, including Jonathan Mayhew Wainwright II
- Occupation: Episcopal bishop
- Education: Harvard College

Jonathan Mayhew Wainwright I (February 24, 1792 – September 21, 1854) was a provisional Episcopal bishop in Manhattan, New York City.

== Early life ==
Wainwright was born in Liverpool, England on February 24, 1792. He was the son of Peter Wainwright and Elizabeth (née Mayhew) Wainwright (1759–1829), who met on a trip to England from the United States and married in 1790. His father was a prosperous English tobacco merchant who emigrated from England to Boston and became a citizen after the American Revolution. His mother was the daughter of Reverend Jonathan Mayhew of Boston. His parents didn't return to Massachusetts until eleven years later, in 1802. Among his siblings was Eliza Wainwright (b. 1794), who married Dr. Walter Channing, a prominent obstetrician. His brother, Robert Dewar Wainwright, was the father of Richard Wainwright, an American Civil War naval officer.

Jonathan graduated from Harvard College in 1812, where he was afterward a tutor. He received the degree of D.D. from Union College in 1823, and from Harvard in 1835. The degree of D.C.L. was conferred upon him by Oxford University in 1852.

== Career ==
On April 13, 1817, he was ordered deacon in the Episcopal Church in Trinity Church, Boston and on May 29, 1818, he was ordained as a priest in Christ Church, Hartford, Connecticut, of which he later became rector.

In November 1819, he moved to New York and became assistant minister in Trinity Church. He was made rector of Grace Church in 1821, and remained in that charge until 1834, when he became rector of Trinity Church, Boston. In 1837 he returned to Trinity Parish, New York, as assistant in charge of St. John's Chapel, which post he retained until he was elevated to the episcopate with the exception of six months' service in 1850 as rector-elect of Calvary Church in Gramercy Park.

He was for many years secretary of the house of bishops, and was instrumental in the founding of New York University. He was considered one of the first pulpit orators of his day. He wielded great social influence, was a ripe scholar, and was a devoted lover of music, contributing toward its improvement in the churches of his denomination. He was secretary of the board of trustees of the General Theological Seminary in 1828–34, and a trustee or officer of many other institutions and societies.

In 1844, he engaged in a controversy with his friend George Potts, which grew out of an assertion that Rufus Choate made at a celebration of the New England society. The orator said that the Pilgrim fathers had founded a "state without a king and a church without a bishop." At the dinner that followed, Wainwright, in responding to a sentiment, said in reply that "there is no church without a bishop." The subsequent discussion with Potts, which was carried on in nineteen letters in the New York Commercial Advertiser, was published as a book No Church Without a Bishop; or, the Controversy between the Rev. Drs. Potts and Wainwright. With a Preface by the Latter, and an Introduction and Notes by an Anti-Sectarian.

On October 1, 1852, Wainwright was elected provisional bishop of the Episcopal Diocese of New York.

== Personal life ==
In August 1818, Wainwright was married to Amelia Maria Phelps (1797–1885), the daughter of Timothy Phelps and Janet (née Broome) Phelps. Together, they were the parents of fourteen children:

- Elizabeth Mayhew Wainwright (1819–1822), who died in childhood.
- Jonathan Mayhew Wainwright II (1821–1863), who married Maria Page (1822–1854) in 1844. He was killed in action during the Battle of Galveston during the Civil War.
- Elizabeth Mayhew Wainwright (1824–1882), who married Simeon Henry Remsen in 1844 and William Holley Hudson in 1864.
- Henry Wainwright (1825–1825), who died in infancy.
- Henry Phelps Wainwright (1826–1827), who died in infancy.
- Henry Phelps Wainwright (1828–1846).
- John Howard Wainwright (1829–1871), who married Margaret Livingston Stuyvesant (1839–1928).
- Maria Trumball Wainwright (1831–1905), who married Theodore Bailey Bronson in 1851.
- Daniel Wadsworth Wainwright (1833–1863), a physician who died in New Orleans during the Civil War.
- Janet Phelps Wainwright (1837–1842), who died in childhood.
- Amelia Maria Wainwright (1838–1867), who married Col. Henry Cary Bankhead (1828–1894) in 1863.
- Francis Chetwood Wainwright (1839–1874), who married Frances Mary Davis.
- Edward Bibby Wainwright (1841–1841), who died in infancy.
- William Augustus Muhlenberg Wainwright (1844–1895), who married Helena Barker "Nellie" Talcott, the daughter of Sarah and Thomas Talcott.

He died at his residence at 5:00 pm on September 21, 1854, in Manhattan, New York City. He was buried at Trinity Church Cemetery.

=== Descendants ===
Through his son John Howard, he was the grandfather of Jonathan Mayhew Wainwright (1864–1945), a U.S. Representative and United States Assistant Secretary of War. Through his son Jonathan, he was the grandfather of US Navy officer Jonathan Mayhew Wainwright III (1849–1870) and US Army officer Robert Powell Page Wainwright (1852–1902), who, in turn, was the father of US Army General Jonathan Mayhew Wainwright IV (1883-1953).

== Works ==
Besides the pamphlet mentioned above, he wrote:

- Four Sermons on Religious Education (New York, 1829)
- Lessons on the Church (1835)
- Order of Family Prayer (1845)
- Short Family Prayers (1850)
- The Pathways and Abiding-Places of our Lord, illustrated in the Journal of a Tour through the Land of Promise (1851)
- The Land of Bondage: being the Journal of a Tour in Egypt (1852)
- Single sermons and papers in periodicals.
- Book of Chants, adapted to services of the Episcopal church (1819)
- Music of the Church (1828)
- The Choir and Family Psalter, with William A. Muhlenberg (1851)
- John Stark Ravenscroft, Sermons, edited with a memoir (2 vols., 1830)
- Life of Bishop Heber, edited biography by Heber's widow (2 vols., 1830)

He edited:

- Book of Common Prayer (1843 illustrated version)

== Consecrators ==
- The Most Reverend Thomas C. Brownell, Presiding Bishop
- The Right Reverend George W. Doane, Bishop of New Jersey
- The Right Reverend Jackson Kemper, Provisional Bishop of Wisconsin
- William Heathcote DeLancey, I Western New York;
- William Rollinson Whittingham, IV Maryland;
- Carlton Chase, II New Hampshire;
- George Upfold; I Indiana;
- John Williams, Coadjutor of Connecticut; and,
- Francis Fulford of Montreal.
