= Richard Wainwright (Medal of Honor) =

Officer in the United States Navy during World War I (1881–1944)

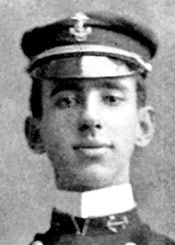
- Wainwright as a U.S. Naval Academy midshipman
- Born: September 15, 1881; Washington, D.C.
- Died: March 28, 1944 (aged 62); Annapolis, Maryland
- Burial place: United States Naval Academy Cemetery
- Relatives: son of Admiral Richard Wainwright
- Military career
- Allegiance: United States of America
- Branch: United States Navy
- Service years: 1902–1921
- Rank: Commander
- Nickname: Dick
- Commands: Landing force from the USS Florida (BB-30)
- Conflicts: Veracruz (1914)
- Awards: Medal of Honor

Richard Wainwright Jr. (September 15, 1881 – March 28, 1944), was an officer in the United States Navy during World War I who received the Medal of Honor for actions during the 1914 Veracruz action.

== Biography ==
Born in Washington, D.C., the son of Evelyn Wotherspoon and Richard Wainwright. He was the grandson of Sarah Franklin Bache and Richard Wainwright. He was the great-grandson of Richard Bache Jr., who served in the Republic of Texas navy and was elected to serve in the Texas legislature and Sophia Burrell Dallas, the daughter of Arabella Maria Smith and Alexander J. Dallas an American statesman who served as the U.S. Treasury Secretary under President James Madison. He was also great-great-grandson of Sarah Franklin Bache and Richard Bache, and a great-great-great-grandson of Benjamin Franklin.

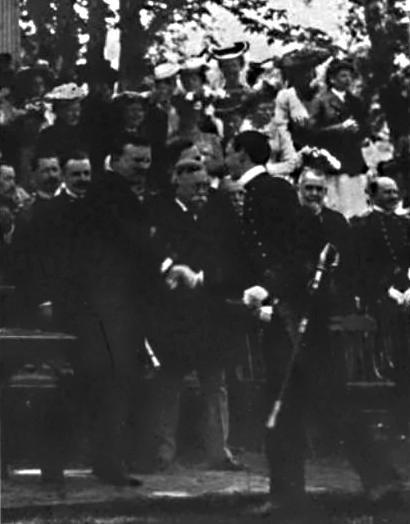
Wainwright shaking hands with United States President Theodore Roosevelt as Wainwright graduated from the U.S. Naval Academy

His uncle was Admiral Seaton Schroeder.

He was appointed "at large" from the District of Columbia to the United States Naval Academy and graduated from there in 1902. For his two-year required Midshipman sea duty, he served on board USS Indiana and USS Chauncey, where he was commissioned an Ensign in May 1904. In December 1905, he returned to sea on board USS Texas then transferred to USS Louisiana. Remaining at sea, Wainwright received orders to USS Connecticut, where he served during that ship's participation in the voyage of the Great White Fleet around the world from 1907 to 1909.

Richard Wainwright married Alice Sorrel Blech (1882–1965) in 1910. At the time, Miss Blech was social secretary for First Lady of the United States Helen Taft, wife of then President Taft. The couple had at least one child, Richard Wainwright III (1911–1936).

In 1911, his assignment supported the early development of naval aviation, and he was recognized as an aviation expert alongside Captain Washington Irving Chambers. He detached from there in May 1911 to attend the summer session at the Naval War College.

After completing the summer course, Wainwright received orders to the battleship USS Florida (BB-30). While leading a landing party from that ship in battle at Veracruz, Mexico, he earned the Medal of Honor for his outstanding conduct on April 21–22, 1914.

=== Medal of Honor citation ===
For distinguished conduct in battle, engagements of Vera Cruz, 21 and 22 April 1914. Lt. Wainwright was eminent and conspicuous in command of his battalion; was in the fighting of both days, and exhibited courage and skill in leading his men through action. In seizing the customhouse, he encountered for many hours the heaviest and most pernicious concealed fire of the entire day, but his courage and coolness under trying conditions were marked.

In September 1914, Wainwright detached from the Florida with orders to the Naval Academy. He received a promotion to Lieutenant Commander on April 28, 1915. He served at the Naval Academy until his retirement.

== Retirement ==
Wainwright retired from the Navy, with a physical disability, on March 3, 1921.

From November 1925 to January 1929, he served as Superintendent of the Navy Department Library.

During World War II, he was recalled to active duty in February 1942 and promoted to Commander.

He died in Annapolis, Maryland March 28, 1944, and is buried in the United States Naval Academy Cemetery.

== Namesakes ==
Three ships have been named USS Wainwright for his father Richard, his grandfather and two other relatives.

== See also ==
- List of Medal of Honor recipients (Veracruz)
