= Jonathan M. Wainwright (general) =

American WWII army general captured by Japanese

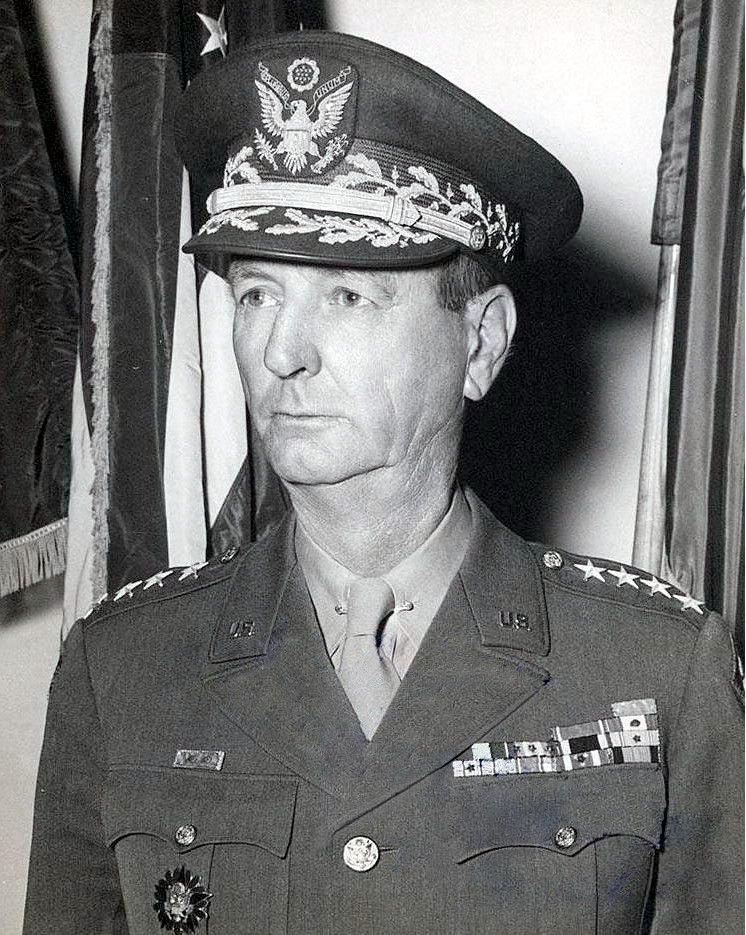
- Wainwright after World War II and promotion to full General
- Born: Jonathan Mayhew Wainwright IV; 23 August 1883; Walla Walla, Washington Territory
- Died: 2 September 1953 (aged 70); San Antonio, Texas, U.S.
- Burial place: Arlington National Cemetery
- Relatives: Jonathan Mayhew Wainwright I (great-grandfather); Jonathan Mayhew Wainwright II (grandfather)
- Military career
- Allegiance: United States
- Branch: United States Army
- Service years: 1906–1947
- Rank: General
- Nicknames: "Skinny", "Jim"
- Commands: Fourth Army; Eastern Defense Command; Second Service Command; United States Forces in the Philippines; Philippine Division; 1st Cavalry Brigade; 3rd Cavalry Regiment
- Conflicts: Philippine–American War; Moro Rebellion; World War I; Battle of Saint-Mihiel; Meuse-Argonne Offensive; World War II; Philippines campaign (1941–42); Battle of Bataan; Battle of Corregidor
- Awards: Medal of Honor; Distinguished Service Cross; Army Distinguished Service Medal Medal of Valor

Signature
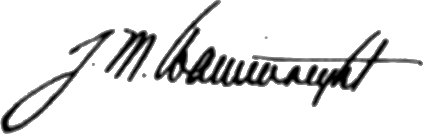

Jonathan Mayhew Wainwright IV (23 August 1883 – 2 September 1953) was a United States Army general, the commander of Allied forces in the Philippines, managing the defense of Corregidor, and a prisoner of the Japanese during World War II.

Wainwright commanded American and Filipino forces during the Japanese invasion of the Philippines, for which he received a Medal of Honor. He oversaw the largest-ever surrender of American armed forces in May 1942, on the island stronghold of Corregidor. At the time of his capture, Wainwright was the highest-ranking American prisoner of war. He spent three years in Japanese prison camps, during which he suffered from malnutrition and mistreatment. Americans viewed him as a hero during his ordeal. In August 1945, he was escorted from Manchuria by the Red Army. Shortly after Japan's surrender, Wainwright was promoted to four-star general.

== Early life and training ==
Jonathan Wainwright was born at Fort Walla Walla on 23 August 1883 to Josephine and Robert Powell Page Wainwright. Josephine's father was civil engineer Edward W. Serrell. Robert was the third generation of a prominent family. His grandfather was Jonathan Mayhew Wainwright, an episcopal bishop in New York City. Robert's father was Jonathan Mayhew Wainwright II, a lieutenant in the United States Navy, who was killed in action during the 1 January 1863, Battle of Galveston in the American Civil War. Congressman J. Mayhew Wainwright was the younger Jonathan's cousin.

Robert Wainwright was a United States Army officer who was commissioned a second lieutenant in the 1st Cavalry in 1875, rose to the rank of major, and commanded a squadron of the 5th Cavalry Regiment in the Battle of Santiago de Cuba during the Spanish–American War. He was posted at Walla Walla, Washington Territory, when Jonathan was born. Robert gave his father's name to his son, emphasizing the family tradition of military service. The family called him by his middle name. In 1902, Robert died of disease in the Philippines.

Jonathan Wainwright graduated from Highland Park High School in Illinois in 1901 and from the United States Military Academy in 1906. He was 6 ft, 2 in, but weighed only 125 pounds when he arrived at West Point, which gave rise to the nickname "Skinny". He served as first captain of the Corps of Cadets.

Wainwright was commissioned in the cavalry. Like his father, he served with the 1st Cavalry Regiment. In 1906, he was stationed in Texas. In 1908, the regiment transferred to the Philippines. Wainwright saw combat on Jolo during the Moro Rebellion.

In 1912, Wainwright attended the Mounted Service School in Fort Riley, Kansas. He broke his leg when a horse kicked him, and he was unable to finish the basic course until 1916. When he was back with the 1st Cavalry on Mexican border patrol in 1916, Wainwright was promoted to captain. By 1917, he was on the staff of the first officer training camp at Plattsburgh, New York.

In 1911, Wainwright married Adele "Kitty" Holley. They had one son, Jonathan Mayhew Wainwright V (1913–1996).

== World War I ==
During World War I, Wainwright was promoted to major in August 1917 and sent to Camp Devens to serve with the 76th Division. In February 1918, he was ordered to France. In June, he became assistant chief of staff of the U.S. 82nd Infantry Division, with which he took part in the Battle of Saint-Mihiel and the Meuse-Argonne Offensive. During the latter battle, an explosion permanently damaged Wainwright's hearing. He was breveted to lieutenant colonel in October 1918. After the war, Wainwright remained in Europe on occupation duty with the 3rd Army at Koblenz, Germany.

== Inter-war period ==
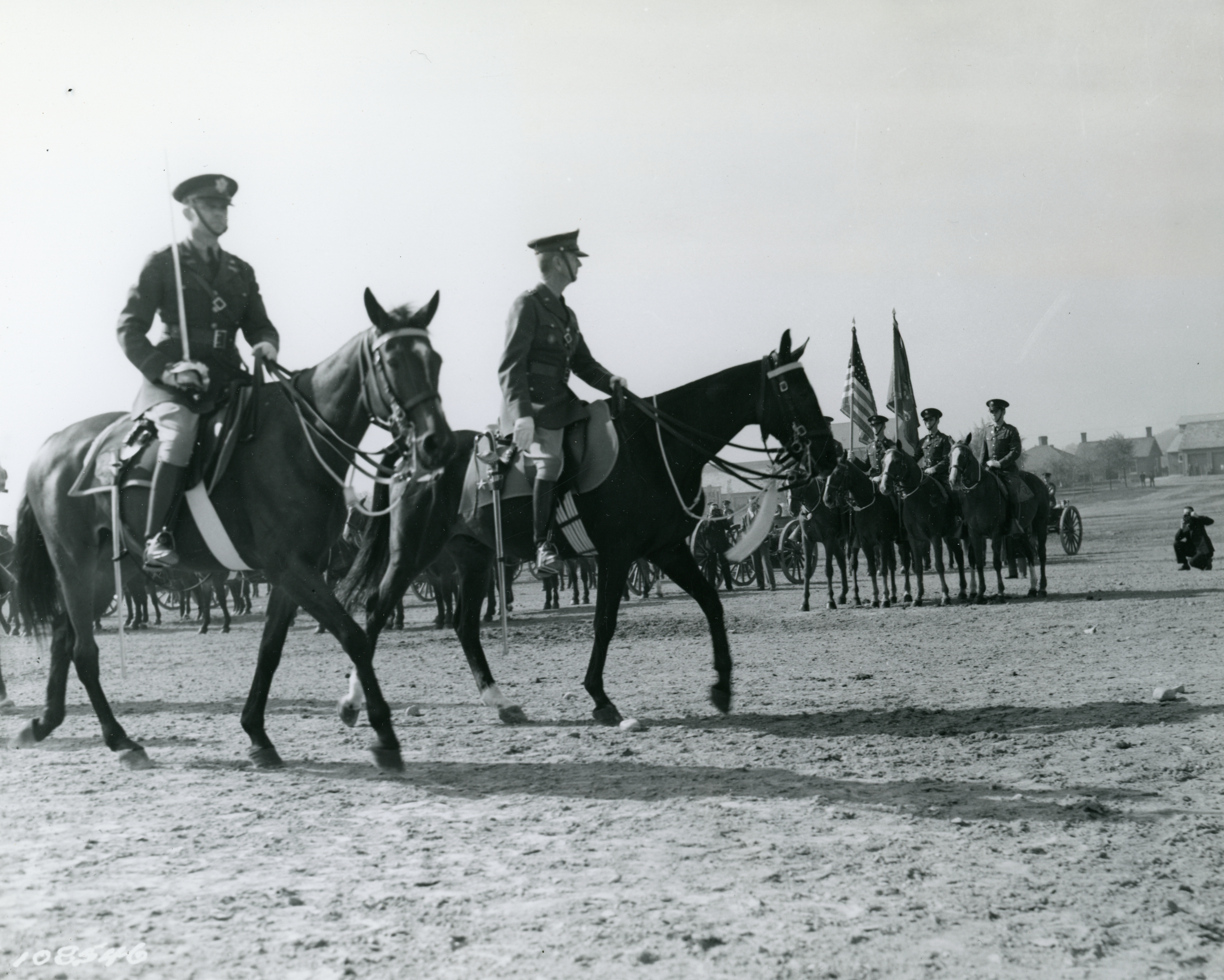
Lt. Col. John Millikin (left) and Wainwright (right) review troops at Ft. Myer, Virginia c. 1938

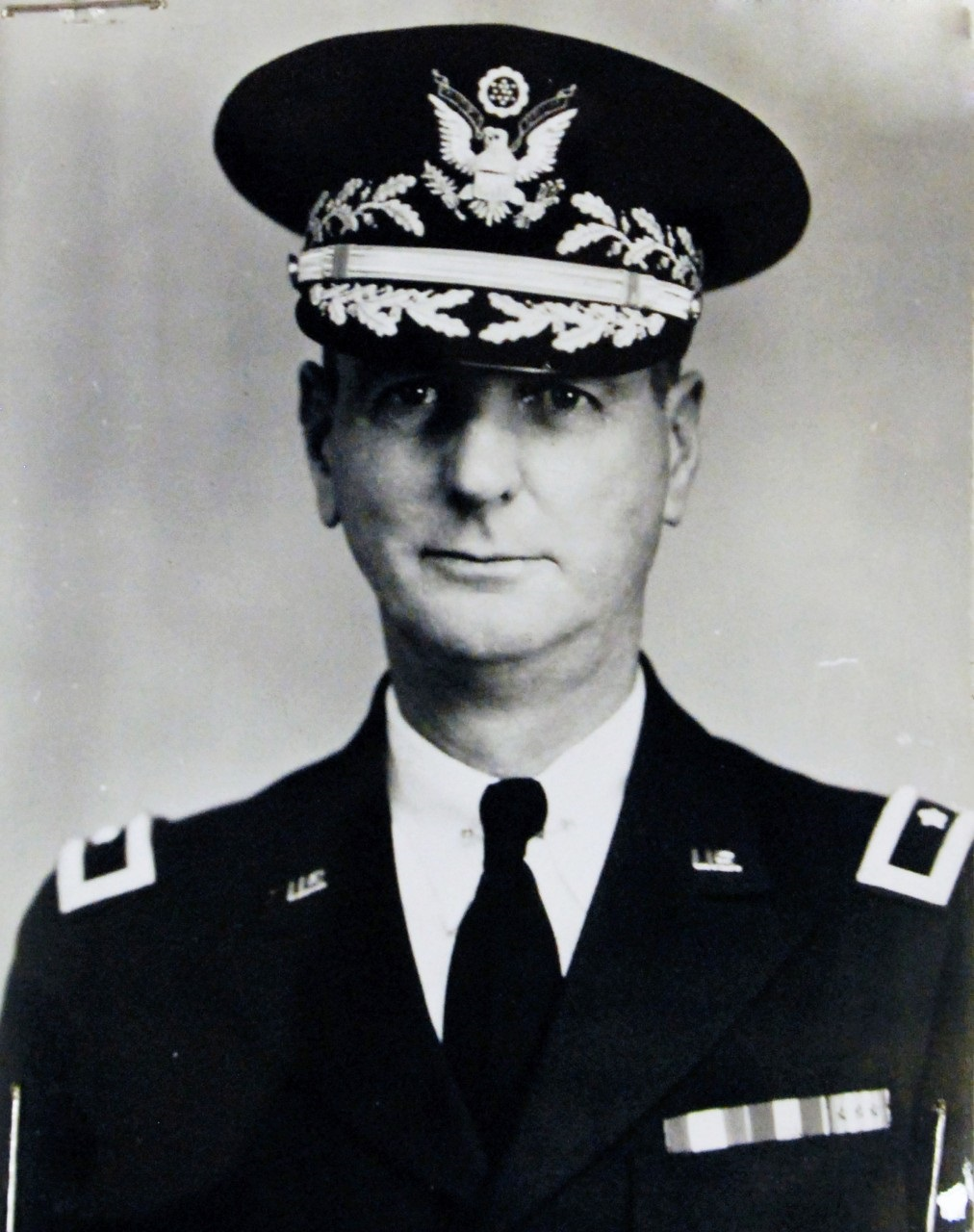
Wainwright as a brigadier general

After a year as an instructor at the Cavalry School at Fort Riley, Wainwright was attached to the general staff from 1921 to 1923 and assigned to the 3rd Cavalry Regiment at Fort Myer, Virginia, from 1923–25. His service during the war delayed his professional training. In 1929, he joined the second class at the newly re-established Command and General Staff School in Fort Leavenworth, Kansas. On 29 December, he was promoted to lieutenant colonel, over a decade after he first attained the rank during WWI.

Wainwright went to the United States Army War College in 1933. His classmates there included Omar Bradley and William Halsey Jr. During his studies, Wainwright repeatedly focused on War Plan Orange, which was the strategy for combatting the Empire of Japan.

Wainwright was promoted to colonel in 1935. He served as commander of the 3rd Cavalry Regiment until 1938, when he was promoted to brigadier general in command of the 1st Cavalry Brigade at Fort Clark, Texas.

In September 1940, Wainwright was assigned to command the Philippine Division, a force of Philippine Scouts led by American officers. On 1 October, just after transiting the Panama Canal on his way back to the Philippines, he was notified of his promotion to major general.

== World War II ==
=== Combat ===
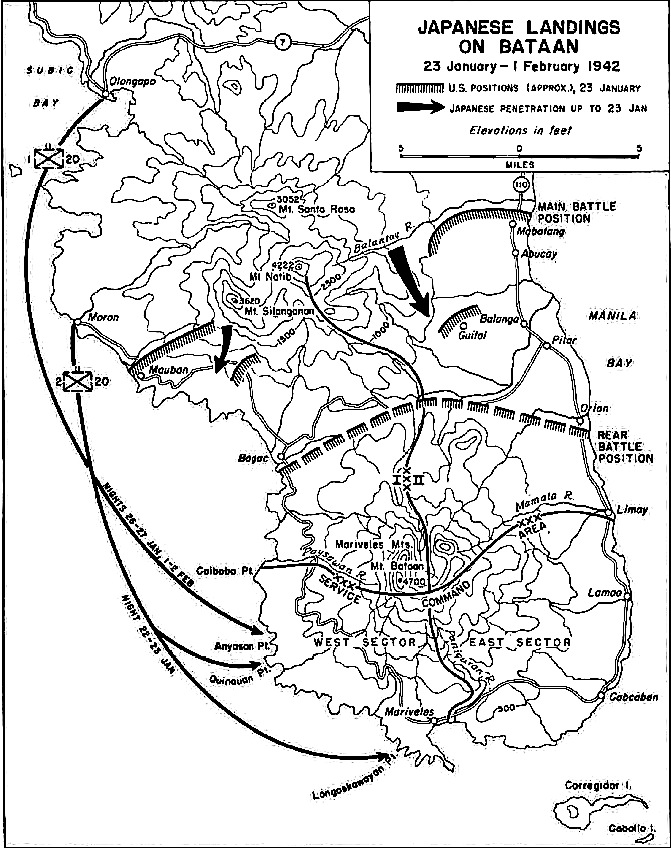
Japanese landings on Bataan 23 January - 1 February 1942

On 8 December 1941, just hours after the attack on Pearl Harbor, Japan launched their invasion of the Philippines. When their first bombs started to drop on Clarke Field, Wainwright was at Fort Stotsenburg, where he spent the previous day enjoying a polo match and watching a movie.

War Plan Orange anticipated the most likely point of attack to be Lingayen Gulf on Luzon. That is precisely where the Japanese established a beachhead on 22 December. The area was defended by Wainwright's North Luzon Force, consisting of three reserve Filipino divisions and the 26th Cavalry Regiment.

The strategy in War Plan Orange was to create a redoubt on the Bataan Peninsula and Corregidor, where the U.S. could defend the entrance to Manila Bay. Instead of withdrawing to a defensive position, MacArthur preferred an offensive strategy. He spread materiel throughout the Philippines to attack an invading force. On 23 December, MacArthur reverted to War Plan Orange, charging Wainwright with protecting the retreat to Bataan. MacArthur evacuated his command to Corregidor.

By January 1942, most of the Allied forces had withdrawn to Bataan without sufficient supplies. MacArthur relentlessly lobbied Washington for reinforcements, hoping to go on the offensive. By 27 January, Wainwright's position on Bataan was insecure enough that he requested permission from MacArthur to shorten the front he had to defend. His men were starving on less than half rations. They slaughtered carabao for meat, and eventually the cavalry had to eat their horses.

On 22 February, President Roosevelt ordered MacArthur to evacuate to Australia to serve as Allied Supreme Commander, South West Pacific Area. MacArthur split the command structure of the Philippines into four sections, leaving Wainwright in charge of Luzon. Uninformed of the change, the President assumed Wainwright was in charge of all the islands. On 19 March, Wainwright was promoted to lieutenant general. A much skinnier Wainwright transferred to Corregidor.

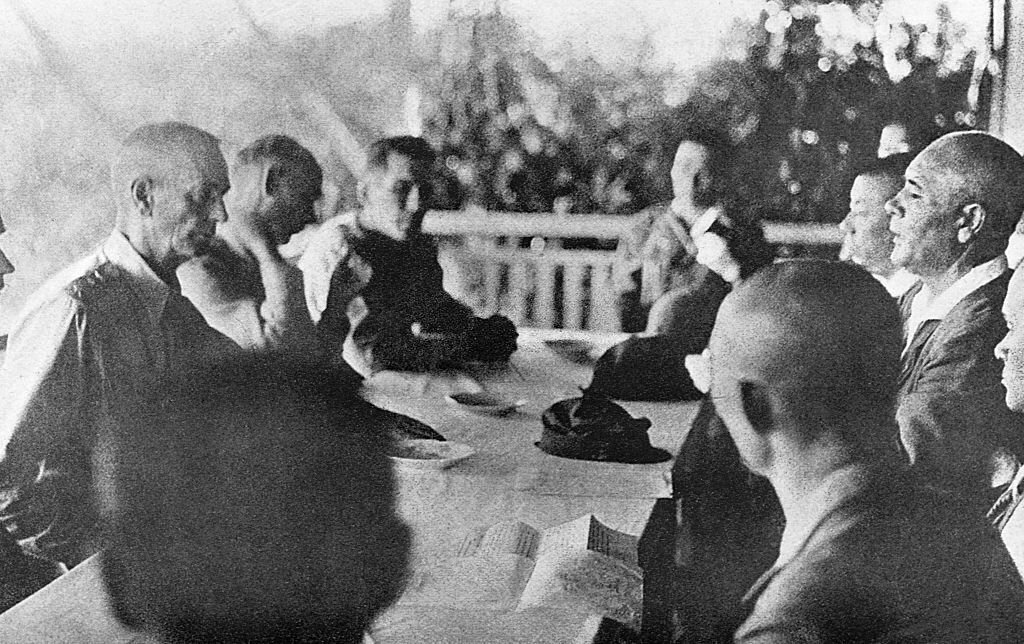
General Wainwright and his staff negotiated their surrender with General Homma at Cabcaben, Bataan (6 May 1942).

Major General Edward P. King was left in control on Bataan as the situation grew hopeless. Wainwright warned Washington that the troops would be starved into submission by 15 April. MacArthur insisted they attack the Japanese to break out of Bataan. On 8 April, Wainwright gave King a modified version of MacArthur's order, knowing it was an impossible task. The following day, King surrendered the 72,000 troops under his command, the largest American force ever defeated.

Japanese General Masaharu Homma was irate King's surrender did not include Corregidor. He spent the next month denuding Corregidor by bomb. Wainwright had no real ability to fight back when Homma's forces landed on 5 May.

Hoping to reduce the number of surrendered troops, Wainwright relinquished his command of all but the forces in Manila Bay. Major General William F. Sharp on Mindanao now commanded America's military presence in the Philippines. Wainwright surrendered at noon on 6 May. War Plan Orange estimated the positions on Bataan and Corregidor could be held for six months at most. Wainwright nearly managed to last that long.

=== Captivity ===
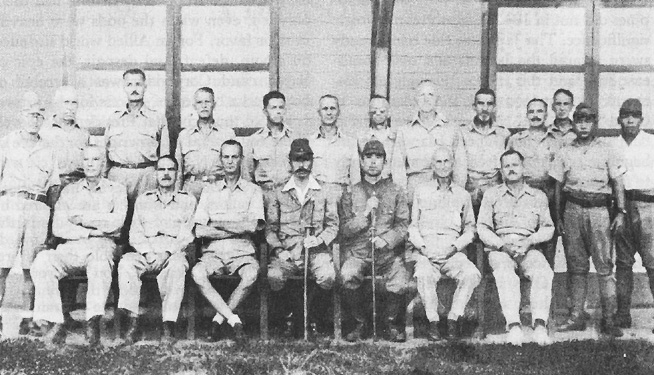
U.S. generals in Japanese captivity: Wainwright is in the front row, third from left (July 1942).

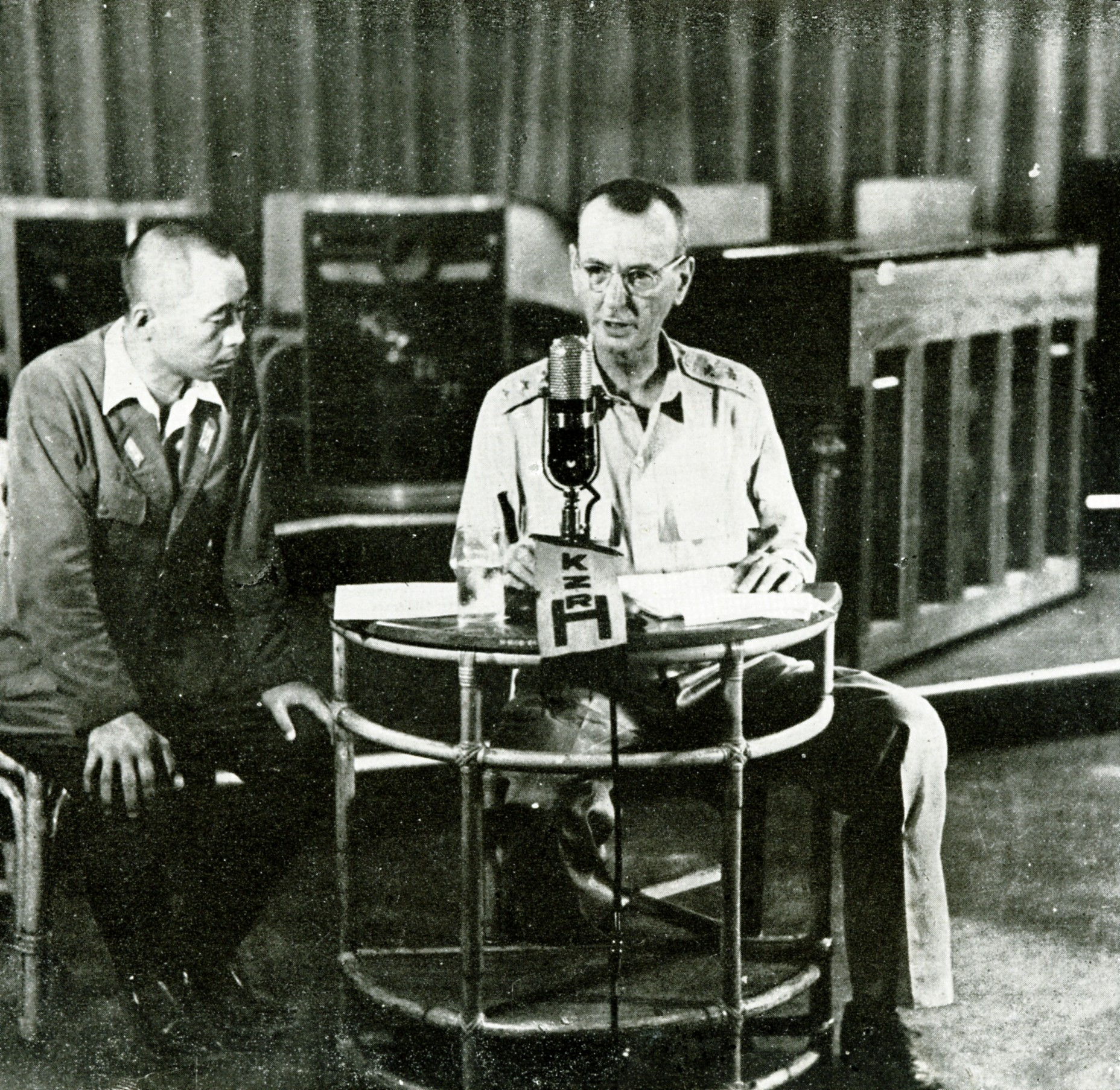
Japanese censor forcing Wainwright to speak positively about the conditions of his imprisonment (1 June 1943)

General Homma refused to accept Wainwright's surrender unless it included all of the forces in the Philippines. Having disarmed and fearing a slaughter on Corregidor, Wainwright agreed to order the surrender of all forces under American command. He was taken to Manila and forced to broadcast his order on the radio. Wainwright reclaimed his command and ordered American forces to surrender.

General Sharp consulted with MacArthur on how to proceed. MacArthur felt Wainwright had taken leave of his senses and urged Sharp to fight on. Wainwright sent an officer to Mindinao to make clear Japan would slaughter their prisoners unless Sharp surrendered. He agreed to surrender on 10 May. Many of Sharp's Filipino soldiers refused to surrender and joined the guerrilla movement led by Colonel Wendell Fertig.

Wainwright was initially held at the University Club in Manila. On 9 June, he was transferred to a converted Philippine Army barracks in Tarlac. He was held there until the following summer. When Americans landed on Guadalcanal, Japan decided to move their high-value prisoner north and transferred Wainwright to Karenkō on Formosa. Many other British, Dutch, and American officers were held there, including General Sharp. By the fall of 1942, Wainwright's treatment had devolved into starvation and abuse.

Wainwright's captivity was a national fixation. In 1942, Wainwright was nominated for the Medal of Honor. General MacArthur shocked his superiors by formally opposing the nomination for a variety of reasons, one of which was Wainwright's surrender. Wainwright agonized over his surrender while in prison, repeatedly re-evaluating the decision in his diary, where he also documented his plummeting weight. Time depicted him behind barbed wire on the cover of the 8 May 1944 issue.

Wainwright was transferred two more times on Formosa, and his treatment improved as the Japanese needed propaganda victories in the face of the Allies' island-hopping advances. When America's B-29s were in position to begin bombing Japan, Wainwright was finally moved to camps in Manchuria. He was imprisoned in brutal, freezing conditions at Xi'an until he was freed.

=== Freedom ===
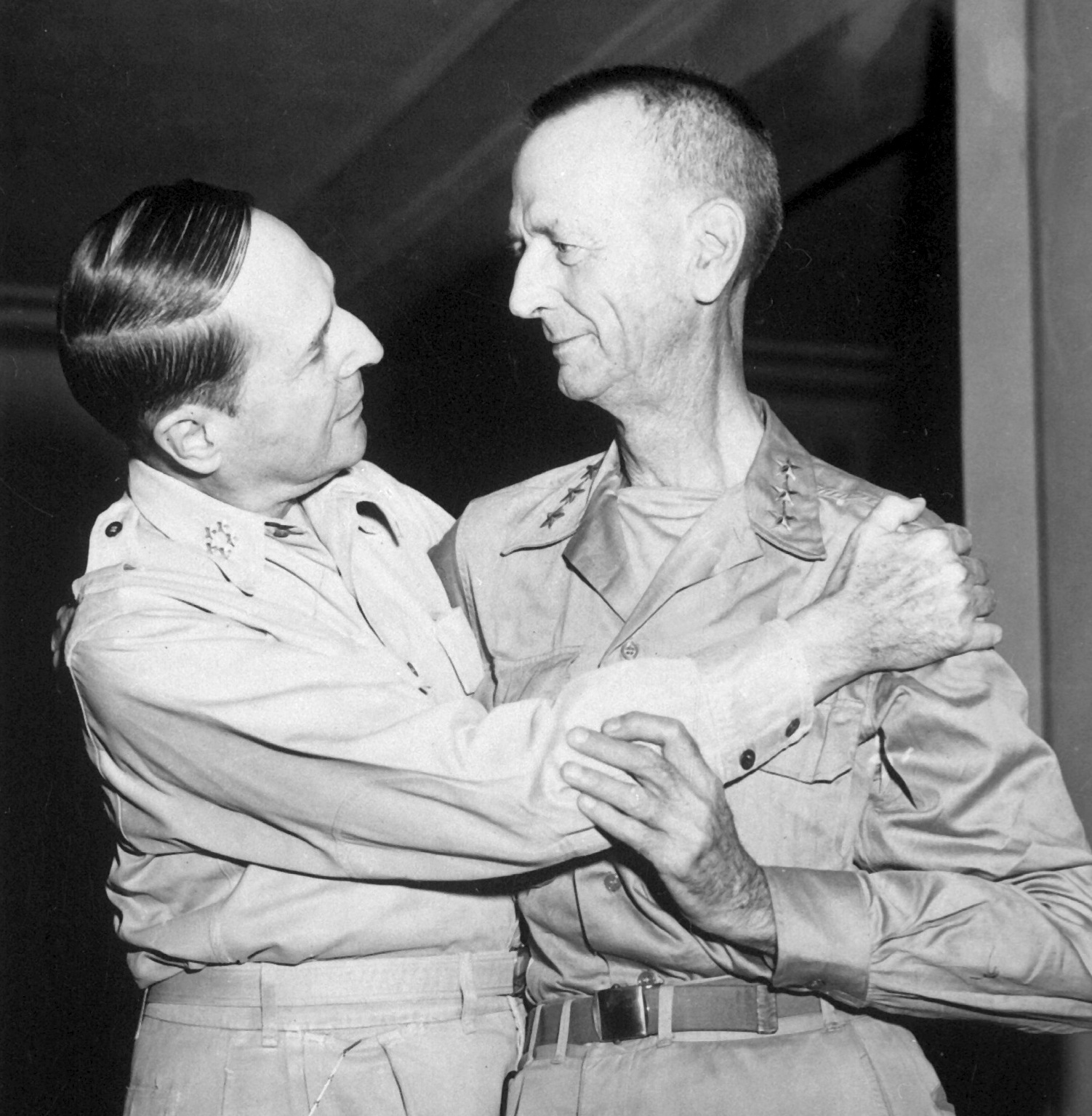
MacArthur (left) greets Wainwright at the New Grand Hotel, Yokohama, Japan (August 31, 1945).

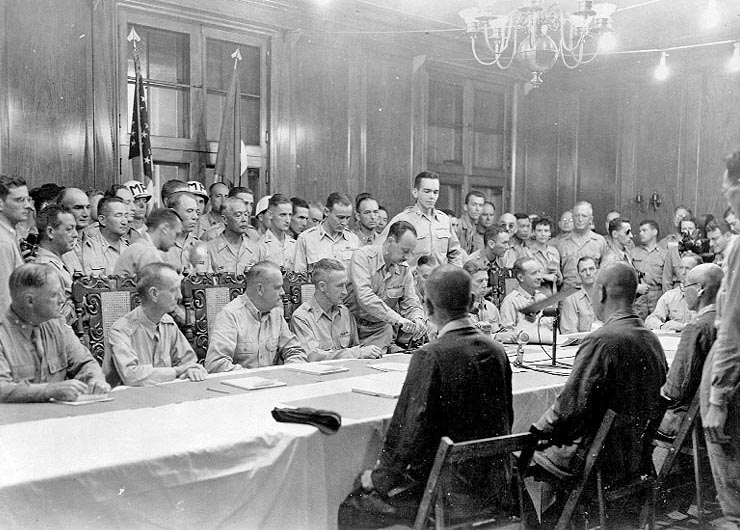
Wainwright (second from left) receiving the surrender of Japanese forces in the Philippines at Baguio, Luzon (3 September 1945)

On 19 August, Wainwright's captors informed the prisoners that the war was over. The first allies to reach him were two agents from the Office of Strategic Services, who secured his release. The Russian Red Army escorted him from a POW camp in Manchuria on 24 August 1945.

On 31 August, Wainwright reunited with MacArthur at the New Grand Hotel in Yokohama, Japan. MacArthur insisted Wainwright stand behind him during the surrender of Japan aboard the USS Missouri on 2 September. While signing the Japanese Instrument of Surrender, MacArthur paused to give Wainwright one of the pens. Wainwright then returned to the Philippines to receive the surrender of local Japanese commander General Tomoyuki Yamashita.

Before he returned to the United States from captivity, Wainwright was inundated with offers for a book deal. He agreed to a $155,000 contract with a publishing syndicate that serialized his memoir before Doubleday published it as a bestselling book.

During the war, Army Chief of Staff General George Marshall mothballed Wainwright's Medal of Honor nomination to avoid provoking MacArthur. Upon victory, Marshall asked Secretary of War Henry Stimson to review it. Stimson rejected MacArthur's objections as "untrue" and "untenable". President Harry S. Truman surprised General Wainwright with the Medal of Honor during an impromptu ceremony in the White House Rose Garden on 10 September 1945.

Wainwright was promoted to four-star general and named commanding general of the Eastern Defense Command at Fort Jay, Governors Island, New York. On 13 September, he received a ticker-tape parade in New York City.

He assumed command of the Eastern Defense Command/Second Service Command at Fort Jay, Governors Island, New York, on 28 September 1945.

== Post-war years and retirement ==
General Wainwright's last command was the Fourth Army at Fort Sam Houston, Texas. Lieutenant General Alexander Patch's death opened the position, and Wainwright took it up on 11 January 1946. Upon reaching the mandatory retirement age of 64, Wainwright reluctantly retired on 31 August 1947.

He became a Freemason in May 1946 at Union Lodge No. 7. in Junction City, Kansas. In 1948, he was elected the national commander of Disabled American Veterans. He was also a Compatriot of the Empire State Society of the Sons of the American Revolution (SAR). His membership application for the SAR was endorsed by General Douglas MacArthur.

Wainwright served on the board of directors for several corporations after his retirement. He frequently spoke to veterans' groups. He never publicly voiced any bitterness toward MacArthur for his actions in the Philippines. When it appeared that MacArthur might be nominated for president at the 1948 Republican National Convention, Wainwright stood ready to make the nominating speech.

On 2 September 1953, Wainwright died of a stroke in San Antonio, Texas, at age 70.

Wainwright was laid to rest near his parents at Arlington National Cemetery. He was buried with a Masonic service and is one of the few people to have had their funeral held in the lower level of Arlington's Memorial Amphitheater. Omar Bradley, George Marshall, and Edward King attended the funeral.

== Awards ==

| 1st row | Medal of Honor | | |
| 2nd row | Distinguished Service Cross | Army Distinguished Service Medal with oak leaf cluster | Prisoner of War Medal (posthumous) |
| 3rd row | Philippine Campaign Medal | Mexican Border Service Medal | World War I Victory Medal with three campaign clasps |
| 4th row | Army of Occupation of Germany Medal | American Defense Service Medal with "Foreign Service" clasp | Asiatic-Pacific Campaign Medal with one campaign star |
| 5th row | World War II Victory Medal | Medal for Valor (Philippines) | Philippine Defense Medal with bronze service star |

Unit awards
| Presidential Unit Citation with two oak leaf clusters | Philippine Presidential Unit Citation |

=== Medal of Honor citation ===
Rank and Organization: General, Commanding U.S. Army Forces in the Philippines. Place and date: Philippine Islands, 12 March to 7 May 1942. Entered Service at: Skaneateles, N.Y. Birth: Walla Walla, Wash. G.O. No.: 80, 19 September 1945.

Citation:

Distinguished himself by intrepid and determined leadership against greatly superior enemy forces. At the repeated risk of life above and beyond the call of duty in his position, he frequented the firing line of his troops where his presence provided the example and incentive that helped make the gallant efforts of these men possible. The final stand on beleaguered Corregidor, for which he was in an important measure personally responsible, commanded the admiration of the Nation's allies. It reflected the high morale of American arms in the face of overwhelming odds. His courage and resolution were a vitally needed inspiration to the then sorely pressed freedom-loving peoples of the world.

=== Other official awards ===
- Army General Staff Badge
- Conspicuous Service Cross, State of New York
- Distinguished Service Medal, Commonwealth of Massachusetts
- Mexican Medal of Military Virtue, 1st Class
- Polish Order of Virtuti Militari

=== Private honors ===
- Knights Commander of the Court of Honour (K.C.C.H.) (Freemasonry)
- Grand Lodge of New York's Masonic Achievement Medal

== Promotions ==
| No pin insignia in 1906 | Second Lieutenant, Regular Army: 12 June 1906 |
| | First Lieutenant, Regular Army: 30 July 1912 |
| | Captain, Regular Army: 1 July 1916 |
| | Major, National Army: 5 August 1917 |
| | Lieutenant Colonel, National Army: 16 October 1918 |
| | Major, Regular Army: 1 July 1920 |
| | Lieutenant Colonel, Regular Army: 2 December 1929 |
| | Colonel, Regular Army: 1 August 1935 |
| | Brigadier General, Regular Army: 1 November 1938 |
| | Major General, Army of the United States: 1 October 1940 |
| | Lieutenant General, Army of the United States: 19 March 1942 |
| | Major General, Regular Army: 31 March 1943 |
| | General, Army of the United States: 5 September 1945 |
| | General, Retired List: 31 August 1947 |

== Namesakes ==
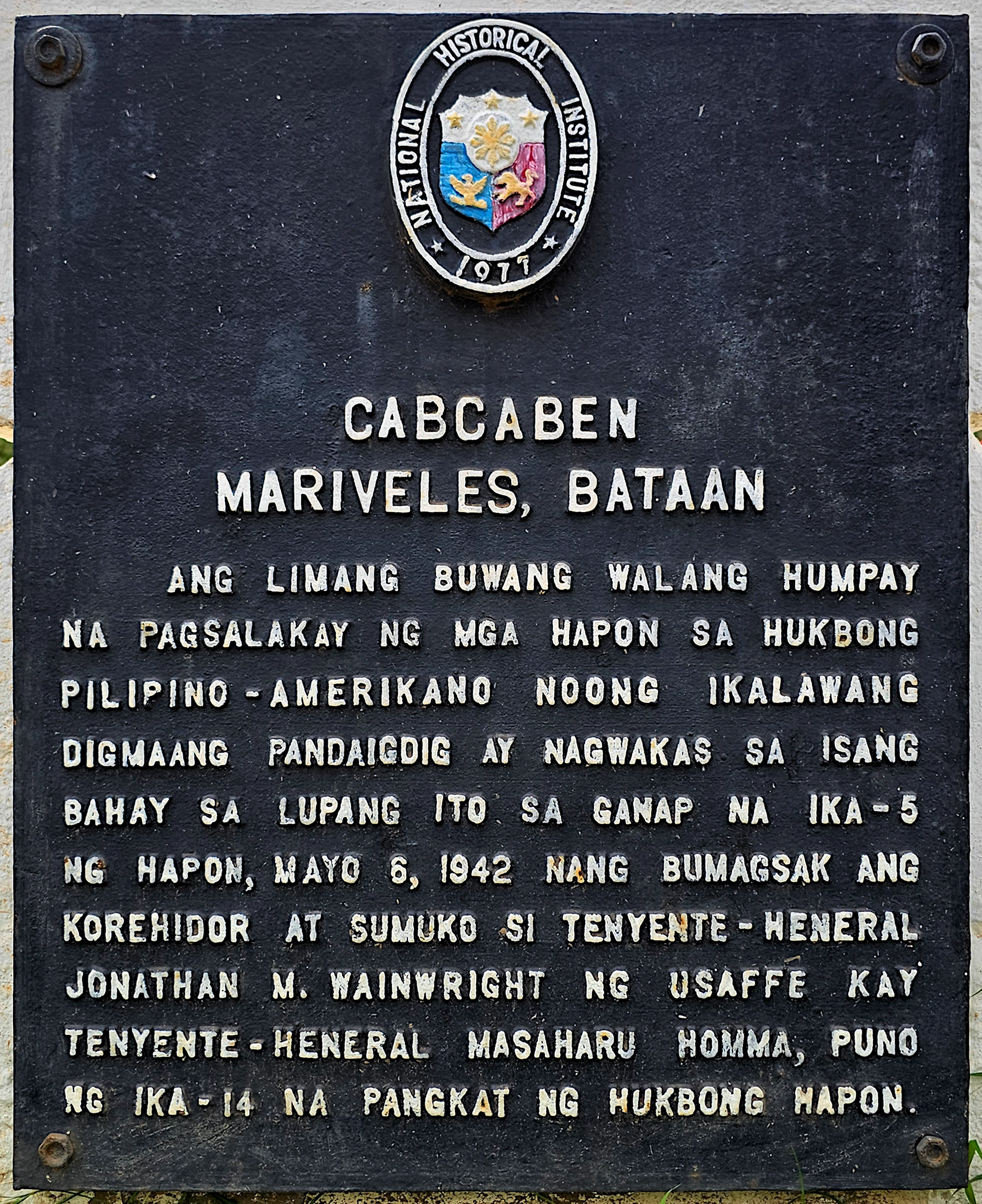
Historical marker installed by the Philippines' National Historical Institute in 1977 in the town of Mariveles, Bataan, to commemorate Wainwright's surrender to Homma

=== The Philippines ===
- There is a memorial to General Wainwright on Corregidor Island in the Philippines.

=== Taiwan ===
- There was a Wainwright School (臺南美國學校) for US Air Force dependents in Tainan, Taiwan, from 1953 to 1976.

=== United States ===
- The Gen. Jonathan Wainwright Award for most outstanding annual Heroes Camp is named in his honor at the Freemasonic National Sojourners Annual National Convention.

==== Alaska ====
- Fort Wainwright in Alaska is named for him.

==== California ====
- There is a Wainwright Drive in San Jose, California.
- There is a Wainwright Court at California State University, Monterey Bay at the former Fort Ord.
- There is a Wainwright Street in Benicia, California (1942 residential subdivision)

==== Florida ====
- Wainwright VFW Post 2185 in Panama City, Florida

==== Louisiana ====
- There is a General Wainwright Drive in Lake Charles, Louisiana.

==== Maryland ====
- There is a Wainwright Street located in the Twinbrook section of Rockville, Maryland.

==== New Jersey ====
- There is a Wainwright Avenue in Closter, New Jersey.

==== New York ====
- There is a Wainwright Drive located in Skaneateles, New York, serving as the entrance to American Legion Post 239.

==== Pennsylvania ====
- A street, Wainwright Drive, was named after him in Pittsburgh, Pennsylvania.

==== Texas ====
- U.S. Army Wainwright Station, Fort Sam Houston, San Antonio, Texas
- There is a street, Wainwright Drive, in El Paso, Texas named after Jonathan Wainwright, as was also an elementary school in the El Paso Independent School District; Wainwright Elementary School opened in 1949 and was closed and placed on reserve status in 2005 in light of the expansion of Fort Bliss through BRAC. It currently serves as a science education resource center; until November 2009; it also served as a student health center.
- There is a housing area on Fort Hood, Texas, called Wainwright Heights.
- There is a Wainwright Street in the Palo Alto Heights (residential subdivision) of San Antonio, Texas.
- Wainwright Elementary School in the Houston Independent School District is named after him.

==== Virginia ====
- Wainwright Hall at Ft. Myer, Virginia, the former Officers' Club in named in honor of Wainwright.

==== Washington ====
- The Veterans Hospital in Walla Walla, Washington is the Jonathan M. Wainwright IV Medical Center.

== Film ==
In the 1977 film MacArthur, General Wainwright is portrayed by Sandy Kenyon.

== Works ==
- Wainwright, Jonathan M.; Robert Considine (1986) [1945]. General Wainwright's Story. New York: Bantam. ISBN 0-553-24061-7.

== See also ==
- List of Medal of Honor recipients
- List of Medal of Honor recipients for World War II § W
- List of Freemasons
