= USS Gloucester (1891) =

American gunboat

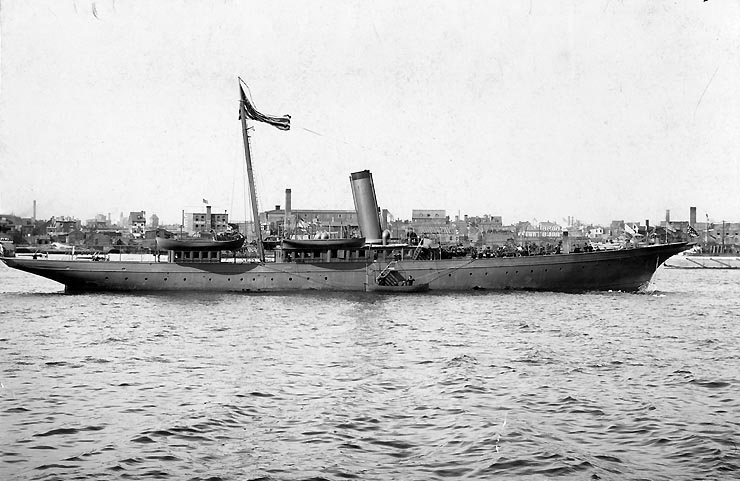
- USS Gloucester

History

United States
- Name: Corsair II (1891–1898); Gloucester (1898–1919)
- Namesake: Gloucester, Massachusetts
- Builder: Neafie & Levy
- Launched: 1891
- Acquired: 23 April 1898
- Commissioned: 16 May 1898
- Stricken: 12 August 1919
- Fate: Sold 1919

General characteristics
- Type: Gunboat
- Displacement: 786 long tons (799 t)
- Length: 240 ft 8 in (73.36 m)
- Beam: 27 ft 2 in (8.28 m)
- Draft: 12 ft (3.7 m)
- Speed: 17 kn (20 mph; 31 km/h)
- Armament: 4 × 6-pounder (32 mm (1.26 in)) guns

USS Gloucester was a gunboat in the United States Navy. She was built in 1891 as the yacht Corsair II for J. P. Morgan by Neafie & Levy of Philadelphia, to a design by John Beavor-Webb. The yacht was acquired by the Navy on 23 April 1898 and commissioned Gloucester on 16 May 1898 with Lieutenant Commander Richard Wainwright in command.

== Service history ==
Gloucester served in Cuban waters in 1898 with the North Atlantic Fleet, Blockading Station. She participated in the Battle of Santiago de Cuba on 3 July against Cervera's fleet. While the main fleets were engaged Gloucester closed with the Spanish torpedo-boat destroyers Plutón and Furor driving them ashore as wrecks with her 6-pounder guns. The victory came with no casualties, which was attributed to "The accuracy and rapidity of her fire, making the proper service of the guns on the Spanish ships impossible."

On 25 July, she entered the harbor before the fleet at Guánica, Puerto Rico, and captured the place for the U.S. Army in what is known as the Puerto Rican Campaign. The handling and fighting of Gloucester merited the commendation of the Navy Department. As the Army was anxious to transfer the place of disembarkation to the harbor of Ponce, the Fleet was directed to proceed to Ponce to reconnoiter; capture all lighters found there; and occupy such positions necessary for holding the port until the arrival of the Army. On 1 August, with assistance from Wasp, Gloucester took possession of Arroyo, and hoisting the U.S. flag, Wainwright held it until arrival of the Army, a day later.

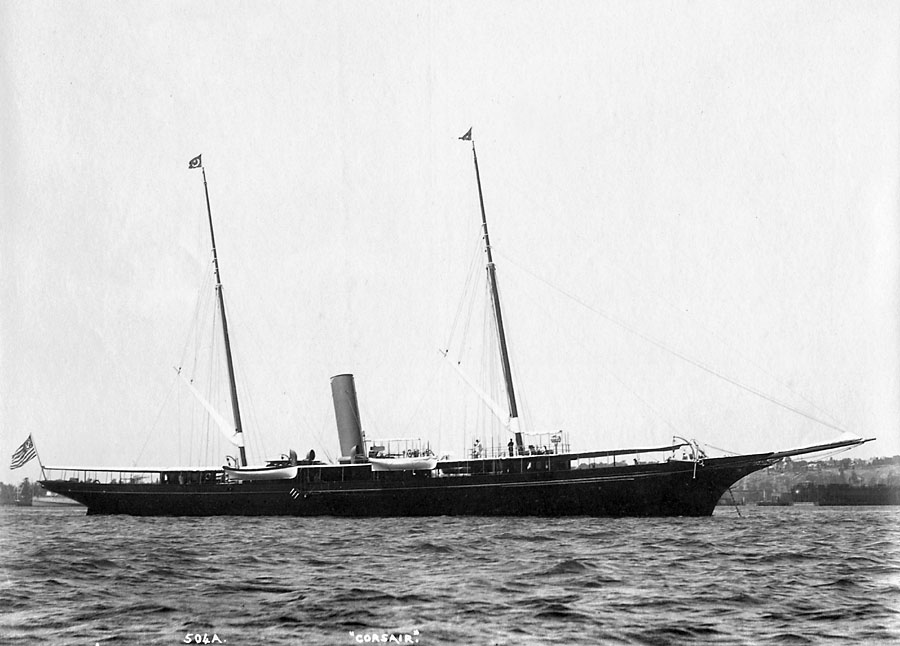
Corsair as it appeared about 1893.

Subsequently Gloucester cruised along the Eastern seaboard from New York City to Provincetown, Massachusetts in the fall of 1898, and from 1899–1902 served as a schoolship at Annapolis, Maryland. Recommissioned at Norfolk, Virginia on 15 November 1902, she served as tender to the Commander in Chief, South Atlantic Squadron, and cruised to ports in the West Indies and along the east coast of South America.

Decommissioned on 8 February 1905, at Pensacola, Florida, the ship was on duty with the Massachusetts and New York Naval Militias at New York City until recommissioned on 7 April 1917 at the Brooklyn Navy Yard. On 16 October 1909 she collided with tow steamer O'Brien Bros. in the East River off One Hundred and Thirty Fifth Street causing some damage to the tow steamer. Charles J. Johnson is listed as master at the time of the accident.

Gloucester conducted harbor patrols at New York City until her name was struck from the Naval Vessel Register on 12 August 1919, and she was sold on 21 November.

== Awards ==
- Sampson Medal
- Spanish Campaign Medal
- World War I Victory Medal

== Bibliography ==
- Eger, Christopher L. (March 2021). "Hudson Fulton Celebration, Part II". Warship International. LVIII (1): 58–81. ISSN 0043-0374.
