= Jonathan Mayhew Wainwright (naval officer) =

United States Navy officer (1821–1863)

Jonathan Mayhew Wainwright II
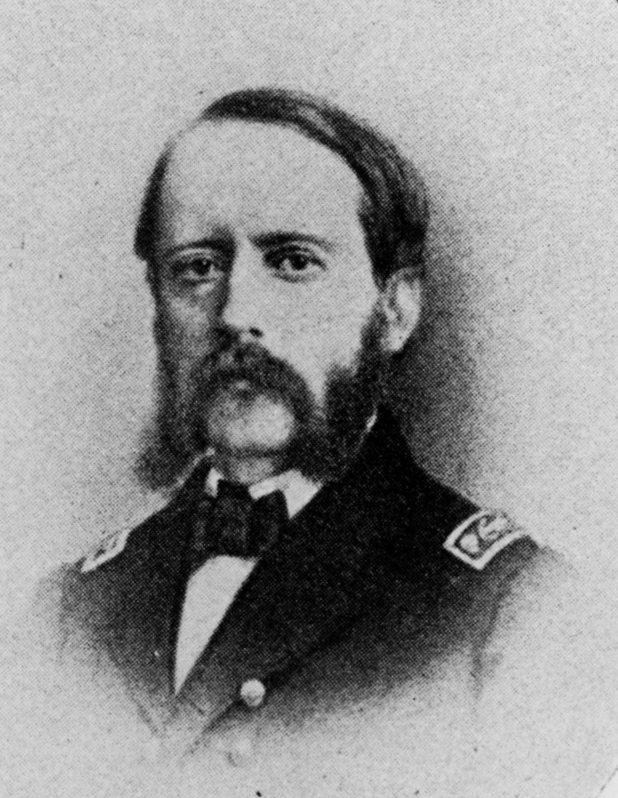
- Born: July 27, 1821; New York City
- Died: January 1, 1863 (aged 41); Near Galveston, Texas
- Spouse: Maria Byrd Page (m. 1844)
- Children: 2
- Relatives: Jonathan M. Wainwright I (father); Richard Wainwright (cousin); Jonathan M. Wainwright IV (grandson)
- Military career
- Allegiance: United States
- Branch: United States Navy
- Service years: 1837–1863
- Rank: Lieutenant
- Commands: Harriet Lane
- Conflicts: American Civil War

Jonathan Mayhew Wainwright II (July 27, 1821 – January 1, 1863) was an officer in the United States Navy during the American Civil War, who was killed in action during the Battle of Galveston.

== Early life ==
Wainwright was born on July 27, 1821, in New York City to Jonathan Mayhew Wainwright I (1792–1854) and Amelia Maria Phelps. His father, an Episcopal bishop, served as the fifth Bishop of New York, from 1852 to 1854, and was instrumental in the founding of New York University.

His paternal grandparents were Peter Wainwright and Elizabeth Mayhew. He was a cousin of naval officer Richard Wainwright.

== Career ==
He entered the United States Navy on June 30, 1837, at age 16, as a midshipman. He attended the Philadelphia Naval Asylum in Philadelphia, Pennsylvania, from 1842 to 1843, and became a passed midshipman on June 29, 1843.

He was appointed acting-master, November 10, 1849, and commissioned lieutenant, September 17, 1850. He was on special duty in Washington, DC in 1861.

He commanded the Harriet Lane, Admiral David Dixon Porter's flagship in Farragut's fleet, in the Battle of Forts Jackson and St. Philip, and took part in operations below Vicksburg.

He was killed in action when his ship was attacked and captured by Confederate forces under the command of General John Bankhead Magruder during the Battle of Galveston on January 1, 1863. He was reportedly personally killed by Confederate naval commander Leon Smith, and a valuable signal book was taken from his corpse.

== Personal life ==
On February 8, 1844, he married Maria Byrd Page in Virginia. She was the daughter of Robert Powell Page (1794–1849), himself a grandson of the Governor of Virginia John Page, and Mary Francis, the daughter of Thomas Willing Francis of Philadelphia. After her mother's death, her father remarried to Susan Grymes, daughter of Archie Randolph. Together, they had four children:

- Elizabeth "Lizzie" Wainwright (died 1883), who married John Page Burwell in 1875.
- Jonathan Mayhew Wainwright III (died 1870), a Lt. in the U.S. Navy who was killed by pirates on the Pacific coast.
- Robert Powell Page Wainwright, a Lt. of Cavalry who married Josepha Sewell.
- Maria Wainwright (born 1855), who married Henry Slaughter in 1873. She later married Louis James and attained some reputation as an actress going by the name "Fannie Louise Buckingham."

=== Legacy ===
His grandson, Jonathan Mayhew Wainwright IV (1883–1953), was a general during World War II.

== Honors ==
Three ships have been named USS Wainwright for Jonathan and some of his relatives.
