= Evelyn Wotherspoon Wainwright =

American suffragist and Washington hostess (1853–1937)

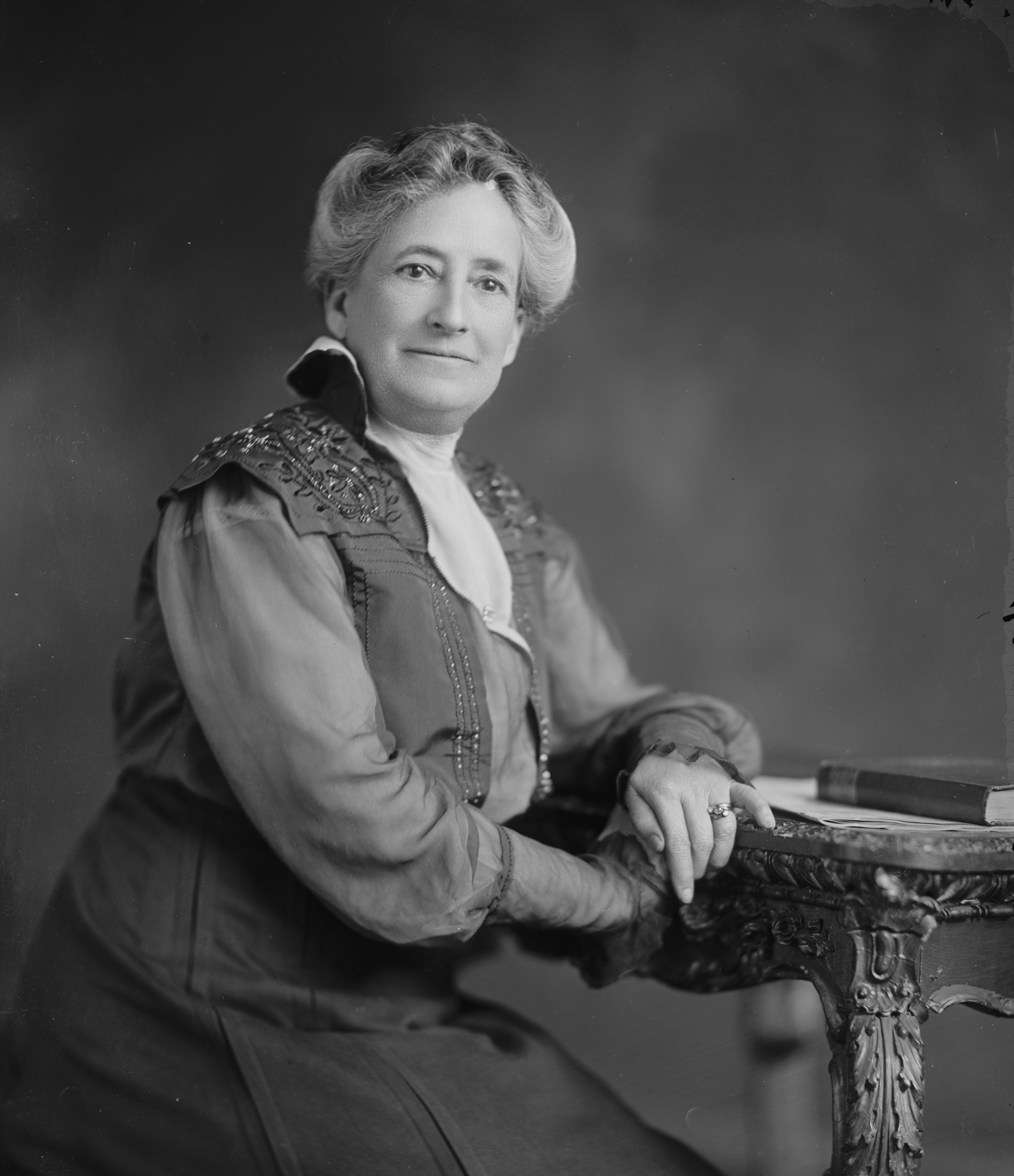
- Born: Evelyn Wotherspoon; June 13, 1853; Washington, D.C., US
- Died: November 24, 1937 (aged 84); Washington, D.C., US
- Resting place: Arlington National Cemetery
- Other names: Mrs. Richard Wainwright
- Occupation: Suffragist
- Spouse: Richard Wainwright (m. 1849)

Evelyn Wotherspoon Wainwright (June 13, 1853 – November 24, 1937) was an American suffragist and Washington hostess.

== Life ==
Evelyn Wotherspoon was born on June 13, 1853, in Washington, D.C. In 1873, she married the military officer Richard Wainwright, with whom she had three children.

Wainwright was a suffragist. She was a founding member of the Congressional Union for Woman Suffrage and the National Woman's Party (NWP). Wainwright used her position as a Washington socialite to further the cause of suffrage by hosting parties and receptions; specifically, in December 1915 she held a reception for the Congressional Union of Woman Suffrage. Wainwright was also known as a public speaker, speaking at the U.S. Senate Committee and the House of Representative. She presented a speech called Appeal to Lafayette at a Lafayette Monument demonstration in 1917. Wainwright picketed the White House during Woodrow Wilson's administration as part of the Silent Sentinels.

Wainwright served as the Chairman of the Committee on Presentation of Picket Pins for the NWP. The picket pins were available to all NWP members who picketed between 1917 and 1919.

Wainwright was also involved with the organization of the Girl Pioneers of Washington, which later became part of the Girl Scouts of America.

Wainwright died on November 24, 1937, in Washington, D.C., aged 84. She is buried in Arlington National Cemetery.

== See also ==
- List of suffragists and suffragettes
