= Richard Wainwright (American Civil War naval officer) =

United States Navy officer of the American Civil War

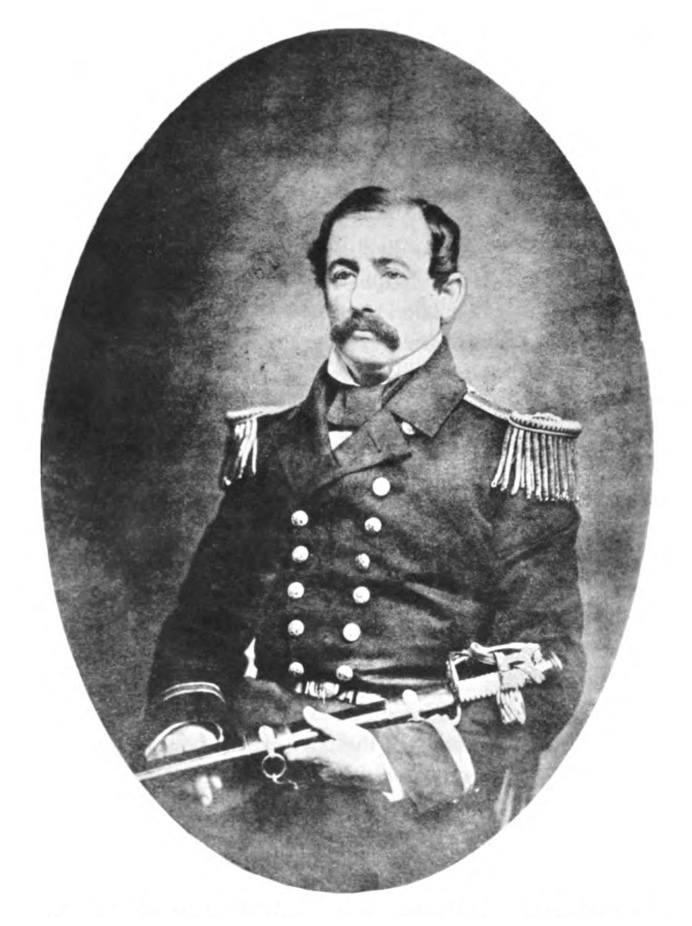
- Born: January 15, 1817; Charlestown, Massachusetts, U.S.
- Died: August 10, 1862 (aged 45); New Orleans, Louisiana, U.S.
- Relatives: Jonathan Mayhew Wainwright II (cousin); Richard Wainwright (son)
- Military career
- Allegiance: United States of America
- Branch: United States Navy
- Service years: 1831–1862
- Rank: Commander
- Commands: USS Merrimack; USS Hartford

Commander Richard Wainwright (January 15, 1817 – August 10, 1862) was an officer in the United States Navy during the American Civil War who commanded Hartford, flagship of Admiral David G. Farragut's West Gulf Blockading Squadron.

== Early life ==
Wainwright was born in Charlestown, Massachusetts, on January 15, 1817. He was the son of Robert Dewar Wainwright and Maria Montresor Auchmuty. He was a cousin of Comdr. Jonathan Mayhew Wainwright.

== Career ==
Wainwright was commissioned in the United States Navy on May 11, 1831. He attended the naval school at Norfolk, Virginia, in 1837–1838, and became a passed midshipman on June 15, 1837. From 1838 to 1841, he served with the United States Coast Survey in the brig Consort. He was commissioned lieutenant on September 8, 1841 and commanded the steamer Water Witch in the U.S.Navy's Home Squadron from 1848 to 1849, served again on U.S. Coast Survey duty from 1851 to 1857, and cruised in the steam frigate Merrimack on special service from 1857 to 1860. He was stationed at the Washington Navy Yard in Washington, D.C., on ordnance duty from 1860 to 1861.

Following the outbreak of the Civil War in April 1861, Wainwright was promoted to commander on April 24, 1861, and commanded Hartford, flagship of Rear Admiral David G. Farragut's West Gulf Blockading Squadron. During the passage of the forts below New Orleans, Louisiana, on the night of April 24 and 25, 1862, he performed gallant service in extinguishing a fire on Hartford while continuing the bombardment of the forts. Commended by Farragut for his actions, Wainwright later participated in the squadron's operations below Vicksburg, Mississippi, until taken ill with fever.

== Personal life ==
On March 1, 1849, Wainwright married Sarah "Sally" Franklin Bache (1824–1880) in Philadelphia, Pennsylvania. She was the daughter of Sophia Burrell (née Dallas) Bache and Richard Bache, Jr., who served in the Navy of the Republic of Texas and was elected to the Texas state legislature. Her maternal grandparents were Arabella Maria Smith and Alexander J. Dallas, an American statesman who served as the United States Secretary of the Treasury under President James Madison. She was the paternal granddaughter of Sarah (née Franklin) Bache and Richard Bache, and the great-granddaughter of Benjamin Franklin. Together, they were the parents of:

- Richard Wainwright, who was a naval officer in the Spanish–American War.
- Dallas Bache Wainwright, who was an officer with the United States Coast and Geodetic Survey.
- Maria Campbell Wainwright, who married Rear Admiral Seaton Schroeder.

Wainwright died at Donaldsonville, Louisiana, on August 10, 1862, aboard USS Hartford.

=== Legacy ===
Three ships have been named USS Wainwright for Richard Wainwright, his cousins, son, and grandson.
