= Order of St. Augustine in the United States =

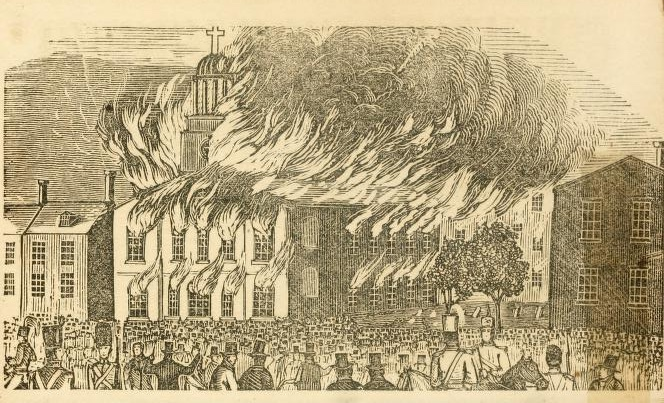
St. Augustine Church, the first parish founded by Augustinian Friars in the United States, was burned by a mob during the Philadelphia nativist riots in 1844.

The Order of Saint Augustine (Augustinian Order) was first established in the United States by Matthew Carr and John Rosseter in the late 18th century. The first institution founded by the order in America was St. Augustine Church in Philadelphia, and the community also founded Villanova University in 1842. By 1905 the order expanded into Chicago and the Midwest and in 1922 established apostolates in California. There are also both active and contemplative religious sisters affiliated with the Augustinians.

== Founding ==
John Rossetter, an Irish Augustinian priest born in 1751, arrived in the United States in 1794, living at the Coffee Run Mission Site and ministering to the local population. By 1796, Rossetter was joined by Matthew Carr, another member of the Order from Ireland, who assumed leadership of the small American community. Both friars were placed at the disposal of John Carroll by their superior in Ireland, having come to the United States at the appeal of Bishop Carroll. On August 27, 1796, the Augustinian Curia in Rome established an independent American province under the patronage of Our Lady of Good Counsel. Both Rosseter and Carr served first at Old St. Joseph's Church and then at St. Mary's Church while continuing fundraising for St. Augustine Church, an initiative Carr had begun soon after his arrival in the United States. Notable contributors to the church included George Washington and John Barry, and the foundation of the building was laid by September 1796. The church opened in 1801 and an adjoining rectory was completed by 1806. Michael Hurley, the first native vocation for the community, entered the order in 1797 and began ministry in Philadelphia following his 1802 ordination. Hurley would go on to serve as a spiritual director to Elizabeth Ann Seton. The American Augustinians struggled to attract vocations following the death of Carr in 1820, but the arrival of more Augustinians from Ireland in the following years reinvigorated the order's presence in the United States.

== Province of Saint Thomas of Villanova (Eastern Province) ==
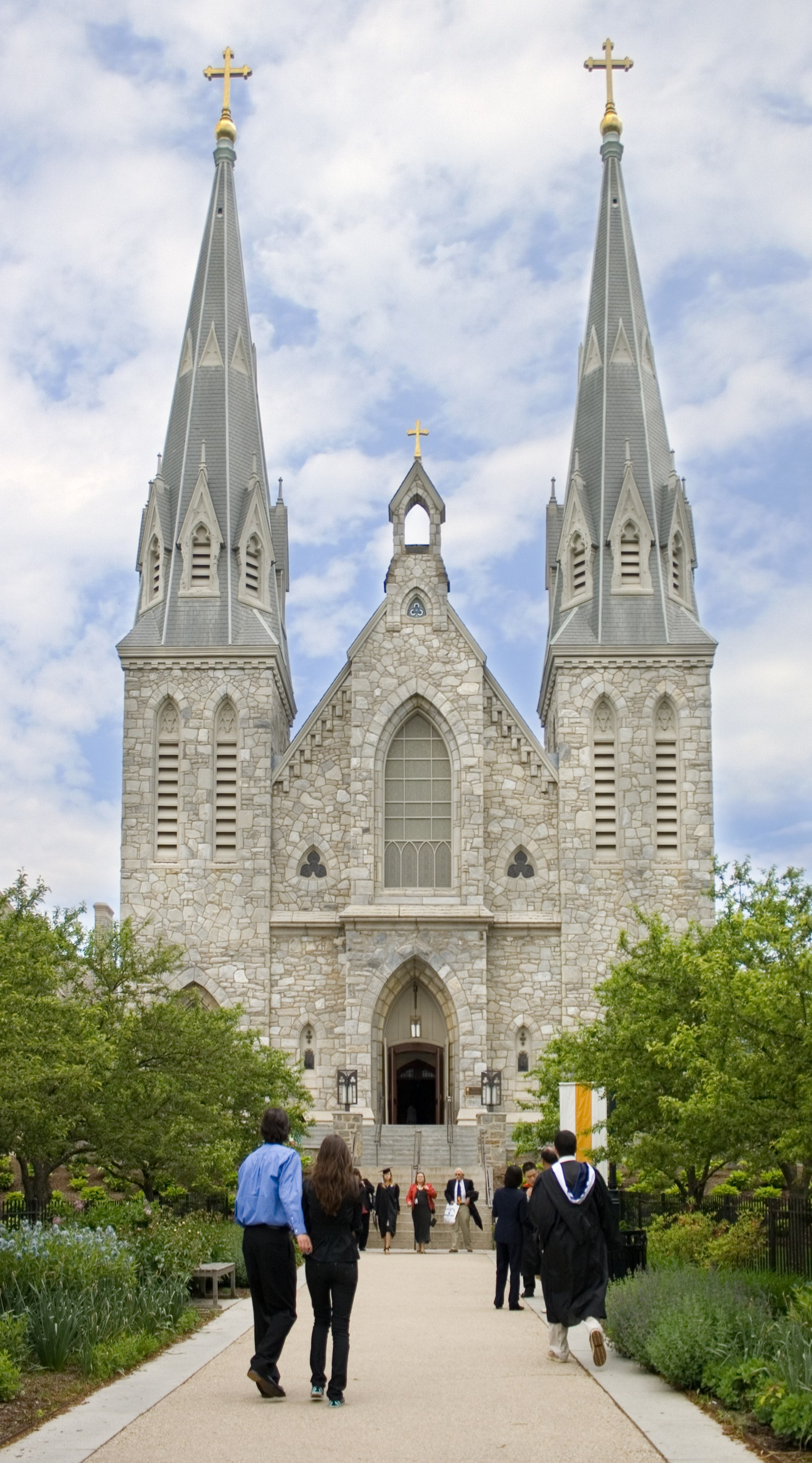
St. Thomas Church on the campus of Villanova University

In 1841, the Augustinians purchased a farm which would become the site of Villanova University, one of the order's most prominent American apostolates. Three years later, on May 6, 1844, anti-Catholic mobs burned St. Augustine to the ground during the Philadelphia nativist riots. A new church was completed by November 1848 and consecrated by Francis Kenrick. Between 1844 and 1874, the friars of the order took on additional parishes and apostolates in the Archdiocese of Philadelphia, Diocese of Albany, Archdiocese of Hartford, Diocese of Ogdensburg, and Archdiocese of Boston. In 1874 the province was renamed after Thomas of Villanova. The province expanded into Cuba in 1899 when it founded what would become the Universidad Católica de Santo Tomás de Villanueva before the Augustinians were expelled in 1961 by Fidel Castro. Augustinian ventures into higher education continued with the founding of Merrimack College in Massachusetts in 1947.

== Province of Our Mother of Good Counsel (Central/Midwestern Province) ==
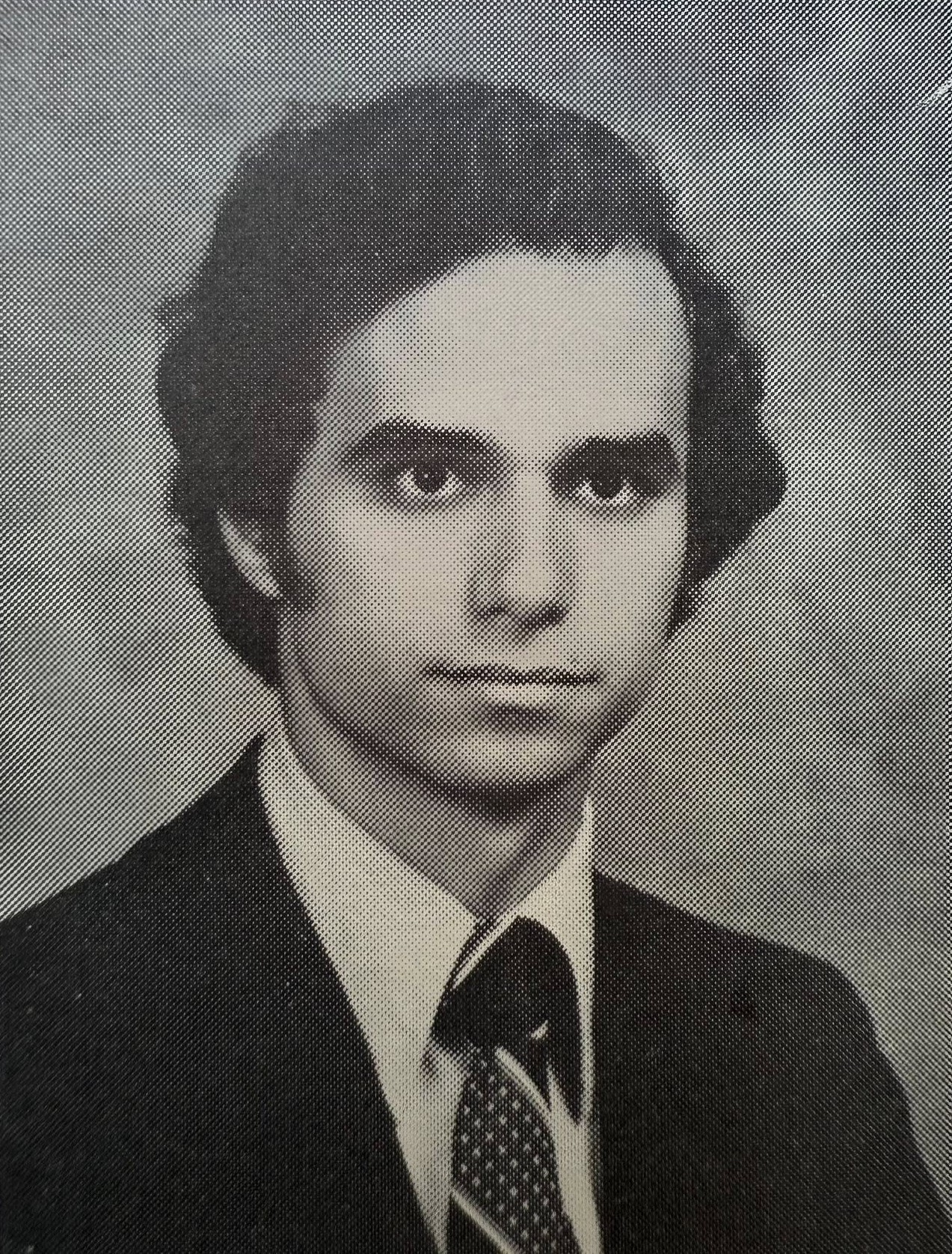
Robert Prevost (the future Pope Leo XIV) 's picture in the Villanova University yearbook in 1977, the same year as his entry into the Augustinian novitiate.

James Quigley, archbishop of Chicago, invited the Augustinians to expand into his archdiocese in 1905. Construction began shortly thereafter on a complex of a church, school, and monastery which would become St. Rita of Cascia High School. In 1909 the friars began construction on three other parishes in the Chicago area and also began to expand into the Archdiocese of Detroit, Diocese of Tulsa, and the Diocese of Rockford. In 1941, the Province of Our Mother of Good Counsel was established, covering the Midwestern United States. In 1949, the province opened St. Augustine Seminary High School in Holland, Michigan. The seminary grounds also housed the first convent of Augustinian Sisters of Contemplative Life from their founding in 1968 to their move to St. Louis ten years later. Tolentine College, a seminary and later a liberal arts college, was operated by the province from 1958 to 1974 in Olympia Fields, Illinois. In 1977, Robert Prevost, the future Pope Leo XIV, entered the Midwestern Province's novitiate at Immaculate Conception Church in St. Louis, Missouri. He took solemn vows for the Midwestern province in 1981.

== Province of Saint Augustine (Western Province) ==
In 1922, the friars expanded to the West Coast of the United States, founding St. Augustine High School in San Diego as well as Villanova Preparatory School in Ojai, California two years later. The St. Augustine province also became known for its particular concern for social justice work, managing a low-income housing project in San Ysidro, San Diego beginning in 1969, the same year it became an independent province. The western province also hosts the headquarters of the Augustinian Secondary Education Association, an organization composed of Augustinian member colleges and high schools working to present an authentic Augustinian identity.

== Foreign missions ==
The Augustinians in the United States also serve in a variety of foreign missions. One of the earliest of these mission sites was in Cuba from 1899 to 1961, when the Augustinians were expelled by Fidel Castro's takeover of the country. In 1952, the Eastern and Midwestern provinces jointly re-established the Augustinians in Japan, which first arrived in the 1600s. An additional joint overseas mission in Peru was established by the Eastern and Midwestern friars in 1963 at the request of Pope John XXIII.

== Notable friars ==
- Pope Leo XIV, formerly Robert Prevost, entered Augustinians in 1977.
- Robert Dodaro, theologian and academic, former president of the Augustinian Patristic Pontifical Institute.
- William Jones, (1865-1921) Bishop of the Archdiocese of San Juan de Puerto Rico, entered Augustinians in 1886.
- Juan Conway McNabb, (1925-2016) Bishop of the Diocese of Chulucanas, entered Augustinians in 1945.
- William Edward Atkinson, (1946-2006) First Quadrapalegic priest of the Catholic Church, Servant of God since 2017.
