= Matthew Carr (priest) =

Augustinian priest (1755–1820)

The Reverend Matthew Carr OSA
- Born: January 1755; Dublin, Ireland
- Died: September 29, 1820 (aged 65); Philadelphia, Pennsylvania, U.S.
- Known for: Founder of the Order of St. Augustine in the United States

Ecclesiastical career
- Church: Catholic Church
- Ordained: June 13, 1778

Thomas Matthew Carr OSA (January 1755 – September 29, 1820) was an Irish Catholic priest who founded the Order of St. Augustine in the United States. He also established St. Augustine's Academy, which later became Villanova University.

== Early life in Ireland ==
Matthew Carr was born in Dublin, Ireland, to Michael and Mary (née McDaniel) Carr. He was baptized at St. Catherine's Church on January 14, 1755. He had a sister, Bridget, who later came to Philadelphia as well.

At the age of 16, Carr entered the Order of St. Augustine at John's Lane Church. He professed his vows on November 6, 1772, taking the name Thomas. He completed his studies at the Augustinian convent in Toulouse, France, where he was ordained a priest on June 13, 1778. Carr returned to Ireland following his ordination, and was elected prior of the Augustinian convent in Dublin on June 17, 1795.

== Ministry in the United States ==
In the spring of 1796, Carr answered an appeal to come to the United States by John Carroll, the nation's first Catholic bishop who then oversaw the entire U.S. Catholic Church. He established his residence in Philadelphia, becoming rector of Old St. Joseph's Church. He was not the first Augustinian in the nation, as his fellow Irish Augustinian, Father John Rossiter, had already settled in Wilmington, Delaware.

On May 27, 1797, the Holy See issued an indult appointing Carr as superior of all the Augustinians in the United States and empowering him to create a new province. Together with Rossiter, he established the province of Our Lady of Good Counsel (now the province of St. Thomas of Villanova). The new province received legal recognition in 1804, when Governor Thomas McKean signed an act of incorporation for the Brothers of the Order of Hermits of St. Augustine.

=== St. Augustine's Church ===
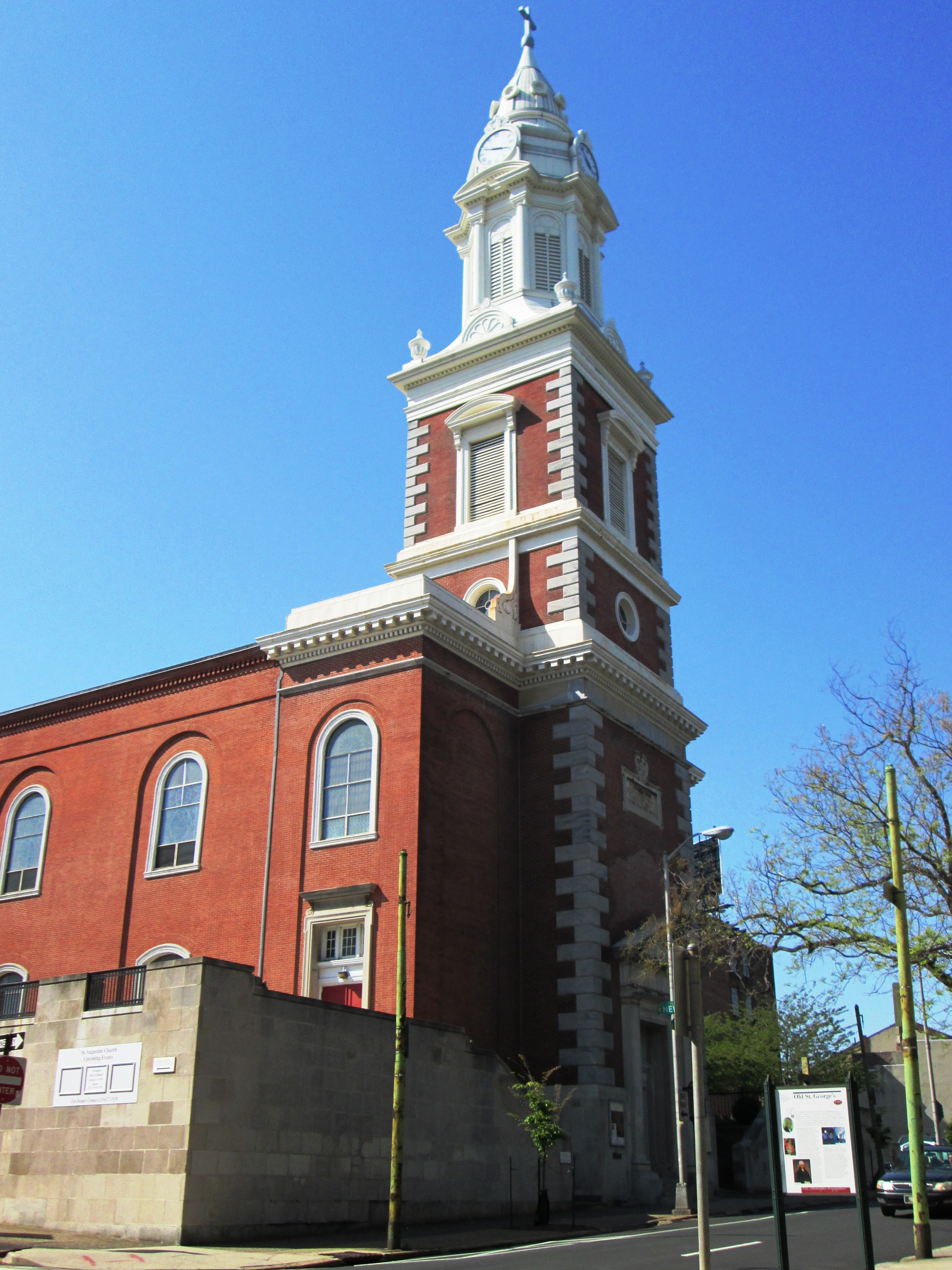
St. Augustine's Church in Philadelphia. The original church was destroyed during the 1844 Philadelphia nativist riots.

In May 1796, shortly after his arrival in Philadelphia, Carr began collecting funds to erect a new church to address the "very great increase of inhabitants, and the grievous inconveniences, under which numbers of them labor, in attending the duties of religion..." Among the contributions he received were $50 from President George Washington, $150 from Commodore John Barry, and $500 from Thomas Fitzsimons. Carr purchased a tract of land near 4th and Vine Streets on June 11, 1796, and the cornerstone of the church was laid on September 4. On June 7, 1801, St. Augustine's Church was dedicated and opened for worship.

In 1799, after Father Leonard Neale was appointed president of Georgetown College, Carr succeeded him as rector of St. Mary's Church. He simultaneously served as rector of St. Joseph's and St. Mary's until 1803, also assuming charge of St. Augustine's when it opened. He was succeeded at St. Mary's by Father Michael Francis Egan, who was later consecrated the first Bishop of Philadelphia in 1810. During his pastoral duties, he received Sally McKean, the daughter of Governor McKean, into the Catholic Church and officiated at her wedding to Carlos Martínez de Irujo.

On December 9, 1811, Carr established a parochial school on Vine Street named St. Augustine's Academy, which later evolved into Villanova University.

=== Vicar General ===
Between 1789 and 1808, the Diocese of Baltimore covered the entire Catholic Church in the United States. On August 26, 1799, Bishop Carroll appointed Carr as vicar general for the northern district of the diocese, which included Pennsylvania and all northern states. He served in this role until his resignation on November 22, 1807, while also serving as rector of St. Augustine's.

As vicar general, Carr resolved a dispute between Bishop Carroll and the trustees of Holy Trinity Church, a German national parish in Philadelphia, over the right to appoint and dismiss their own pastor.

== Death and legacy ==
Carr retired for a time to Conewago Township, Pennsylvania, and served as professor of rhetoric at St. Mary's Seminary in Baltimore, Maryland. He later returned to Philadelphia, where he died on September 29, 1820, at the age of 65. He is buried in the vault of St. Augustine's Church.

In 2025, Pope Leo XIV, the first Augustinian pope and the first to be born in the United States, recorded a message to the province of St. Thomas of Villanova, saying:

We stand on the shoulders of Augustinian friars, like Father Matthew Carr and Father John Rossiter, whose missionary spirit led them in the late 1700s to go forth and bring the good news of the Gospel in service to Irish and German immigrants, searching for a better life and religious tolerance.
