= Servando Teresa de Mier =

Mexican politician

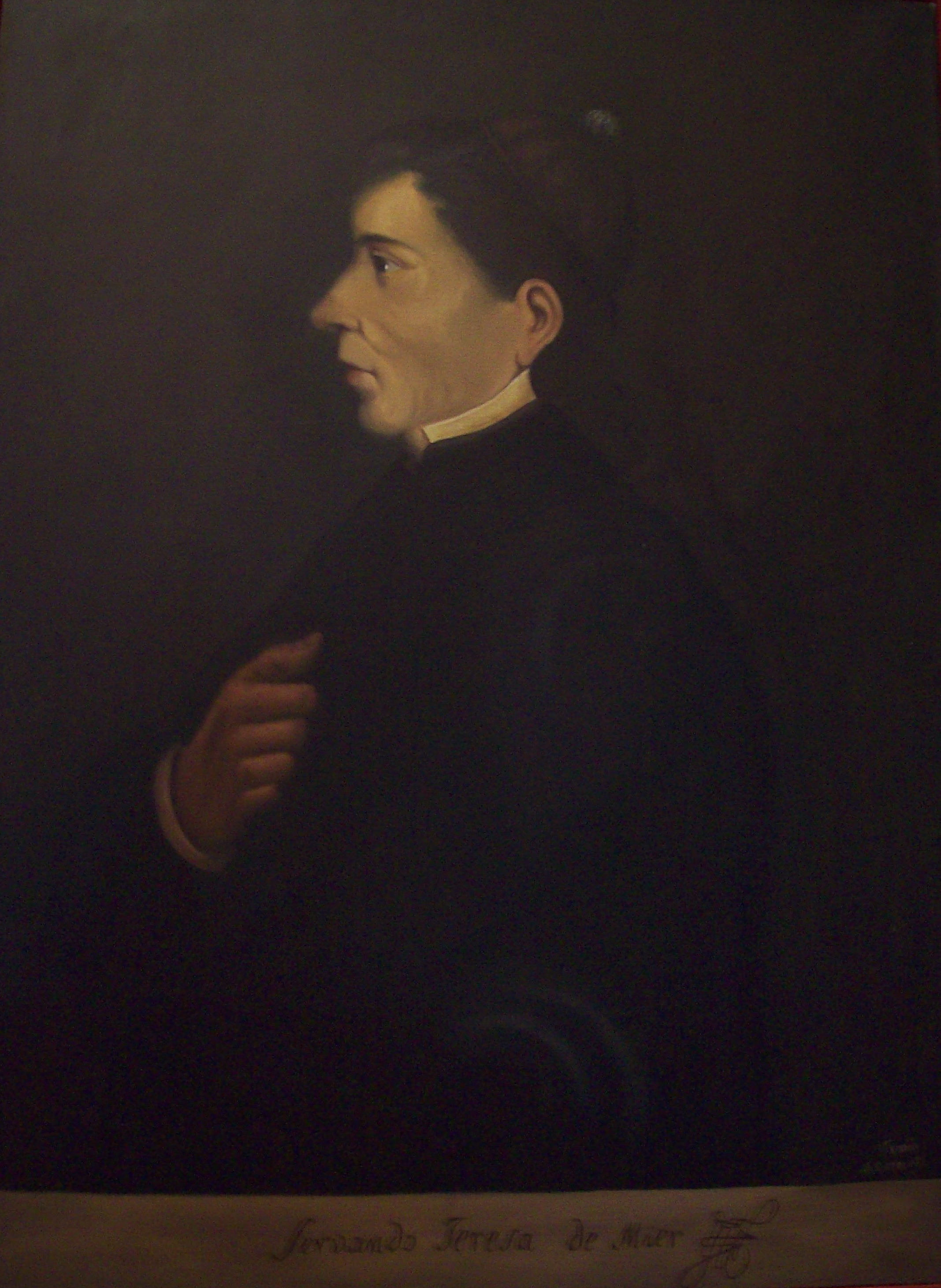
- Portrait in the Museo Nacional de las Intervenciones

Deputy to the Second Constituent Congress
- In office 7 November 1823 – 24 December 1824
- Constituency: Nuevo León

Personal details
- Born: October 18, 1765 Monterrey, New Kingdom of León, New Spain (now Nuevo León, Mexico)
- Died: December 3, 1827 (aged 62) Mexico City, Mexico

Fray José Servando Teresa de Mier Noriega y Guerra (October 18, 1765 – December 3, 1827) was a Catholic priest, preacher, and politician in New Spain. He was imprisoned several times for his controversial beliefs, and lived in exile in Spain, France and England. His sermons and writings presented revisionist theological and historical opinions that supported republicanism.

Mier worked with Francisco Javier Mina during the Mexican War of Independence and, as a deputy in independent Mexico's constituent Congress, opposed Agustín de Iturbide's claim to imperial rule. He is honored for his role in Mexican independence.

== Education ==
Mier was born in Monterrey, Nuevo León, in the Viceroyalty of New Spain (in modern-day Mexico). He was a descendant of the Dukes of Granada and conquistadors of Nuevo León. At the age of 16, Mier entered the Dominican Order in Mexico City. He studied philosophy and theology in the College of Porta Coeli, and was ordained a priest. By the age of 27, he had earned his doctorate and was a noted preacher.

== The sermon ==
On December 12, 1794, during the commemorations of the Virgin of Guadalupe apparition, in the presence of Viceroy Miguel de la Grúa Talamanca y Branciforte, marqués de Branciforte, Archbishop Manuel Omaña y Sotomayor and the members of the Audiencia of New Spain, Mier preached a sermon affirming that the apparitions of the Virgin of Guadalupe had happened 1750 years before, and not in 1531. He argued that the original painting of Our Lady of Guadalupe was on the cloak of Saint Thomas the Apostle, who had preached in the Americas long before Spanish conquest, and this had been re-discovered by Juan Diego. This sermon, with its bold revision of Mexican history and identity, was seen as a provocation. Our Lady of Guadalupe represented an intense and highly localized religious sensibility that Creole leaders, such as Miguel Hidalgo y Costilla, would later use in their opposition to Spanish rule as a symbol of Mexico.

== In exile ==
The sermon initially drew no attention but one week later, Archbishop Nuñez de Haro condemned Mier to 10 years' exile in the convent of Las Caldas del Besaya in Cantabria, Spain; a perpetual ban from teaching, preaching, or hearing confessions; and the loss of his doctoral degree.

In 1796, he was granted permission to present his case to the Council of the Indies. However, on his return from the Council, he took the wrong road and was arrested again. This time, he was confined to the Franciscan convent in Burgos. In 1801, he escaped and took refuge in Bayonne, France. From Bayonne, he passed to Bordeaux and later to Paris. There he was interpreter for the rich Peruvian José Sarea, Count of Gijón.

Together with Simón Rodríguez, Simón Bolívar's former teacher, he opened an academy in Paris to teach Spanish and to translate Atala of François-René de Chateaubriand. Atala was set in Louisiana, with a Native American heroine. Mier also wrote a dissertation against Constantin-François de Chasseboeuf, comte de Volney.

In Paris, he came to know Chateaubriand; Lucas Alamán, then traveling as a student but later an important conservative politician in Mexico; Baron Alexander von Humboldt; and the Duke of Montmorency. In 1802, he left the Dominican Order and became a secular priest in Rome.

When he returned to Madrid, he was again apprehended, this time for a satire he had written supporting Mexican independence. He was sent to the reformatory in Seville, from which he escaped in 1804. However, he was again arrested and returned to prison, where he spent three years. Then the Pope named him his domestic prelate, because he had converted two rabbis to Catholicism.

In the war between France and Spain, he returned to Spain as military chaplain of the Volunteers of Valencia. He was present at many battles. In Belchite, he was taken prisoner by the French, but he was able to escape again (for the fifth time). He presented himself to General Blake, who recommended him to the Junta of Seville for his services. The Regency in Cádiz granted him an annual pension of 3,000 pesos.

He moved to London, where he collaborated with José María Blanco on El Español, a newspaper that supported the independence movements in Latin America.

== Expedition to New Spain ==
In London, he met the Spanish revolutionary Francisco Javier Mina. Mina convinced him to join an expedition to New Spain to fight for its independence. They sailed for the United States on May 15, 1816, arriving in Norfolk, Virginia. Mier became friends with New Granadan exile Manuel Torres while Torres and other Spanish American agents helped organize Mina's expedition. The expedition left for New Spain in September, with disastrous results. With the capture of the insurgents' fort at Soto de la Marina on June 13, 1817, Mier was taken prisoner again, this time by the royalists. He was sent to the castle of San Carlos de Perote, thence to the dungeons of the Inquisition, and finally, in 1820, to Havana—where he escaped for a sixth time.

=== In Philadelphia ===
After this escape Mier returned to the United States again in June 1821, where lived in Manuel Torres' home in Philadelphia for three months along with Ecuadorian activist and future president Vicente Rocafuerte. Torres was now acting as the Colombian representative in the U.S. Though opposites in demeanor, Mier and Torres shared a fanatical anti-monarchism and had a close friendship.

Through Torres, Mier contacted Colombian secretary of foreign relations Pedro José Gual to encourage him to send a diplomat to Mexico to counter the monarchist movement there, which he did the next year. Mier published several works while in Philadelphia, including a new edition of A Brief Account of the Destruction of the Indies and the anti-monarchical tract Memoria politico-instructiva enviada a los gefes de Anáhuac. Historian Charles Bowman suggested one pamphlet bearing Mier's name, La América Española dividida en dos grande departamentos, Norte y Sur o sea Septentrional y Meridional, was uncharacteristically moderate for Mier—and was actually Torres' work.

The priest involved himself in a controversy surrounding St. Mary's Church, to which he was connected through Torres and merchant Richard W. Meade, another acquaintance. Mier defended the parish's excommunicated priest William Hogan, who had offended Bishop Henry Conwell. The trustees of St. Mary's defied the bishop by keeping Hogan as their priest. For Mier this was a matter of control over what the American form of the Church should be, and he became central to the debate. In a dialog of pamphlets "Servandus Mier" made vigorous assertions and was vigorously condemned; in one response he wrote, "It is true that I was a prisoner of the inquisition ... but I would think citizens in the United States and every civilized country would consider this honourable." He left the U.S. with a Colombian passport issued by Torres.

== Return to independent Mexico ==
In February 1822, he returned to Mexico, at Veracruz, but was again taken prisoner and held at the castle of San Juan de Ulúa, still in control of the Spanish. The first Mexican constituent congress was able to secure his release; he became a deputy for Nuevo León.

He opposed the Mexican Empire under Agustín de Iturbide, and was arrested again. He was imprisoned in the convent of Santo Domingo, but on January 1, 1823, he escaped again, for the seventh and last time.

=== As a member of the constituent congress ===
He was elected a deputy to the second constituent congress. On December 13, 1823, he delivered his famous speech Discurso de las profecias (loosely translated, "Prophetic Discourse"). In this speech he argued for a centralized republic or in the event of a federal system being adopted, for its being in moderation. He was among the signers of the Act Constituting the Federation and of the Federal Constitution of the United States of Mexico. Mexico's first president, Guadalupe Victoria, invited him to live in the palace.

== Death and legacy ==
In 1797, he wrote a letter where he confirms that the original date of the apparition of the Virgen de Guadalupe was celebrated by the Mexica natives on September 8 (of the Julian calendar), and by the Spanish on December 12.

Nearing death, he invited his friends to a party to bid him farewell on November 16, 1827. He gave a speech justifying his life and opinions, and died on December 3, 1827. He was interred with great honor in the church of Santo Domingo in Mexico City. In 1861, his body was exhumed, together with 12 others. All the bodies were mummified.

The mummies were exhibited under the claim they were victims of the Inquisition. Some of the mummies, including Mier's, were sold to an Italian who accepted the claim. His mummy was later shown in Brussels, but what became of his remains after that is unknown.

Mier's name is inscribed in letters of gold on the Wall of Honor of the Legislative Palace of San Lázaro, the building that today houses the Chamber of Deputies in Mexico City.

== Writings ==
Mier published many speeches, sermons and letters on religion and politics, including the following:

- Cartas de un americano al español (Letters from an American to the Spaniard), 1811–13.
- Historia de la revolución de Nueva España (New Spain Revolution History), 2 vols., London: 1813. 2nd ed., Mexico City: 1922.
- Apología y relaciones de su vida bajo el título de Memorias (His life's apology and relations under memoirs title), Madrid: 1924. 2nd ed., Mexico City: 1946.
- The Memoirs of Fray Servando Teresa de Mier (Library of Latin America), New York: Oxford University Press, 1998.
