= Michael Hurley (19th-century priest) =

Augustinian priest (1780–1837)

The Very Reverend Michael Hurley
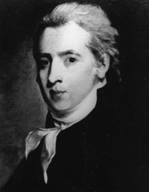
- Portrait of Hurley in 1813 by Thomas Sully
- Other post: Vicar general of the Diocese of Philadelphia

Orders
- Ordination: 1802

Personal details
- Born: 1780
- Died: May 14, 1837 (aged 56–57) Philadelphia, Pennsylvania, U.S.
- Buried: St. Augustine Church
- Denomination: Catholic Church

Michael Hurley (1780 – May 14, 1837) was an American Catholic priest and an Augustinian friar. He served as pastor of St. Augustine Church in Philadelphia for seventeen years, as vicar general of the American province of the Order of Saint Augustine, and as vicar general of the Diocese of Philadelphia.

== Biography ==
Michael Hurley was born in 1780, the son of Thomas Hurley. Conflicting records indicate that he was either born in Ireland or the United States. Hurley's half-sister claimed that he was born in Philadelphia, while other accounts claim he was born in Ireland, as his father was married in Tipperary. If he had been born in Ireland, he would have been brought to America in his infancy, since city records list Thomas Hurley as an upholsterer on Third Street between Arch and Race Streets in 1785. Hurley had three brothers, John, Joseph, and Edward, who were all baptized at St. Joseph's Church in Philadelphia. It is likely that Hurley's father intended that he enter the upholstery trade, due to the fact that Michael's name appears alongside his father's in the City Directory and is marked "paperhanger" at 16 Carter's Alley, the location of his father's business. This implies that he actually learned the trade.

Despite his early exposure to the upholstery business, Hurley became the first aspirant in the new American province of the Order of Saint Augustine (Augustinians). In 1797, Hurley was sent from the United States to Rome for his religious formation and priestly training. In 1802, he was ordained a priest there. Following his ordination, Hurley was sent back to the United States, where he became an assistant curate to Father Matthew Carr, the pastor at St. Augustine Church in Philadelphia. With Carr's death on September 29, 1820, Hurley became the only Augustinian in Pennsylvania, and he assumed the role of the church's second pastor. In this role, he oversaw the building of the church to its completion in 1829, a project his predecessor had started.

In 1822, Hurley was appointed the vicar general of the Augustinian American province, known at the time as the Province of Our Lady of Good Counsel, a role Carr had held before him. He remained as vicar general of the province until his death. Hurley was also appointed vicar general for the Diocese of Philadelphia during Bishop Henry Conwell's episcopate. Hurley was a friend of Saint Elizabeth Ann Seton, who commended him for converting a number of high profile people, including her sister-in-law, to Catholicism.

When Philadelphia was afflicted with an epidemic of Asiatic cholera in July 1832, Hurley allowed the friary of Saint Augustine's and a building adjacent to it to be converted into hospital, as the existing hospitals of Philadelphia became overwhelmed by the number of patients. This makeshift hospital was overseen by one doctor, Hurley, and the Sisters of Charity. For this work, he received an honorable citation. Likewise, Hurley had earlier been praised by the local medical profession for his assistance in the 1805 yellow fever epidemic. While pastor, Hurley also said mass at the Belle-Air estate owned by Jane and John Rudolph in Radnor Township, Pennsylvania. Moreover, in 1830, he received into the steeple of St. Augustine's Church a historic duplicate of the Liberty Bell that was cast in the same foundry as the original Liberty Bell; this bell had hung in Independence Hall and had been rung with the Liberty Bell on July 4, 1776.

A reputed orator, Hurley gave speeches at the consecration of Bishop Ambrose Maréchal and at the funeral of Bishop Michael Francis Egan. At one point, he was successful in having a clause removed from the New York State Constitution that Catholics regarded as offensive.

Hurley died on May 14, 1837, in Philadelphia. He was succeeded as pastor of St. Augustine's by Father Patrick E. Moriarty in 1839. His funeral was presided over by Bishop Francis Kenrick, and he was buried in the vault beneath St. Augustine Church alongside Matthew Carr and other Augustinian friars.

Catholic Church titles
Preceded by Matthew Carr, O.S.A.	2nd Pastor of St. Augustine Church; 1820—1837	Succeeded by Patrick E. Moriarty, O.S.A.
