= Henry Conwell =

Irish-born American Catholic bishop

The Right Reverend Henry Conwell
- Bishop of Philadelphia
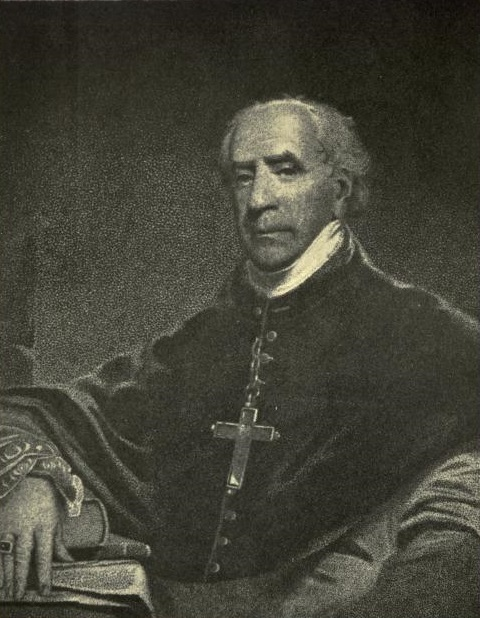
- Province: Baltimore
- Appointed: 26 November 1819
- Installed: 2 December 1820
- Term ended: 22 April 1842
- Predecessor: Michael Francis Egan
- Successor: Francis Patrick Kenrick

Orders
- Ordination: November 1776
- Consecration: 24 September 1820 by William Poynter

Personal details
- Born: c. 1748 Moneymore, County Londonderry, Kingdom of Ireland
- Died: 22 April 1842 (aged 93–94) Philadelphia, Province of Pennsylvania, British America
- Denomination: Roman Catholic

Henry Conwell (c. 1748 – 22 April 1842) was an Irish-born Catholic prelate who served as Bishop of Philadelphia from 1820 until his death.

He became a priest in 1776 and served in that capacity in Ireland for more than four decades. After the Pope declined to appoint him Archbishop of Armagh, the diocese in which he served as Vicar General, he was instead installed as the second Bishop of Philadelphia in 1819.

Conwell took up the post at an advanced age and spent much of his time there feuding with the lay trustees of his parishes, especially those of St. Mary's Church in Philadelphia. When Conwell removed and excommunicated William Hogan, a controversial priest at St. Mary's, the parish trustees instead rejected Conwell's authority, creating a minor schism. The two sides partially reconciled by 1826, but the Vatican hierarchy believed Conwell had ceded too much power to the laymen in the process and recalled him to Rome.

Although he retained his position, Conwell was compelled to relinquish actual control to his coadjutor bishop, Francis Kenrick. He remained in Philadelphia and performed some priestly duties, but for all practical purposes no longer ran the diocese. He died there in 1842 at the age of about 94.

== Early life and priesthood ==
Henry Conwell was born about 1748 in Moneymore, County Londonderry, Ireland, the son of Owen Conwell and his wife, Mary (Keegan) Conwell. (Note: Earlier sources give Conwell's date of birth as about 1745, but an Irish researcher, Brother Luke of De La Salle Monastery in Bagenalstown, later discovered evidence that it was likely 1748.) He studied at the Irish College in Paris and was ordained to the priesthood there in November 1776.

Conwell was well-educated, being fluent in Latin, French, Spanish, and Italian, but had a reputation as a preacher of only modest ability. Around 1785, he contemplated moving to the United States but was concerned about the still uncertain financial state of the new country's parishes, and ultimately decided not to apply for a position there. He was appointed parish priest of Dungannon in 1792 or 1793 and Vicar General of the Archdiocese of Armagh in 1794. After the death of Archbishop Richard O'Reilly in 1818, Conwell served as acting Archbishop.

== Bishop of Philadelphia ==
=== Ordination ===
Many of the clergy who served under him in Armagh recommended that the Pope appoint Conwell to head the diocese permanently. Some opposed him, accusing him of being frequently absent from his parish to visit France and Scotland. The British government also objected, favouring Patrick Curtis instead, as they saw him as more friendly to their interests. Pope Pius VII appointed Curtis to Armagh, offering Conwell instead a choice of the sees of Philadelphia or Madras; Conwell chose Philadelphia. Now more than 70 years old, he was ordained bishop in London on 24 September 1819, by Bishop William Poynter, the Vicar Apostolic of the London District, assisted by Fathers James Bramston and Joseph Francis Carpue. (Note: Although three bishops are typically required for ordination, the Pope may issue a dispensation when co-consecrators are unavailable.)

The see of Philadelphia had been vacant since the death of Bishop Michael Francis Egan in 1814, despite several efforts to fill it. Archbishop John Carroll of Baltimore, whose province included Philadelphia, had considered no fewer than fifteen priests for the position; some had been ruled out for one reason or another, and others (including the apostolic administrator, Louis de Barth) had turned the job down. Part of the delay was logistical—Carroll was unsure of the exact procedure for selecting a candidate in the recently erected province—but part was due to the perceived undesirability of the post, which oversaw only a few small churches in a part of the nation with few Catholics.

There was also a significant dispute (known as trusteeism) over the rights of churches' lay trustees that was likely to complicate the job of running the diocese. In Europe, the Church owned property and directly controlled its parishes through the clergy. In the United States, however, early Catholic churches were typically founded by laymen who purchased the property and erected the church buildings. Those laypeople accordingly demanded some control over the administration of the parish, even after the arrival of clergy from Europe who held the traditional view of parish organization. In a larger sense, the dispute represented a difference in understandings of authority between Americans and Europeans.

=== Hogan schism ===
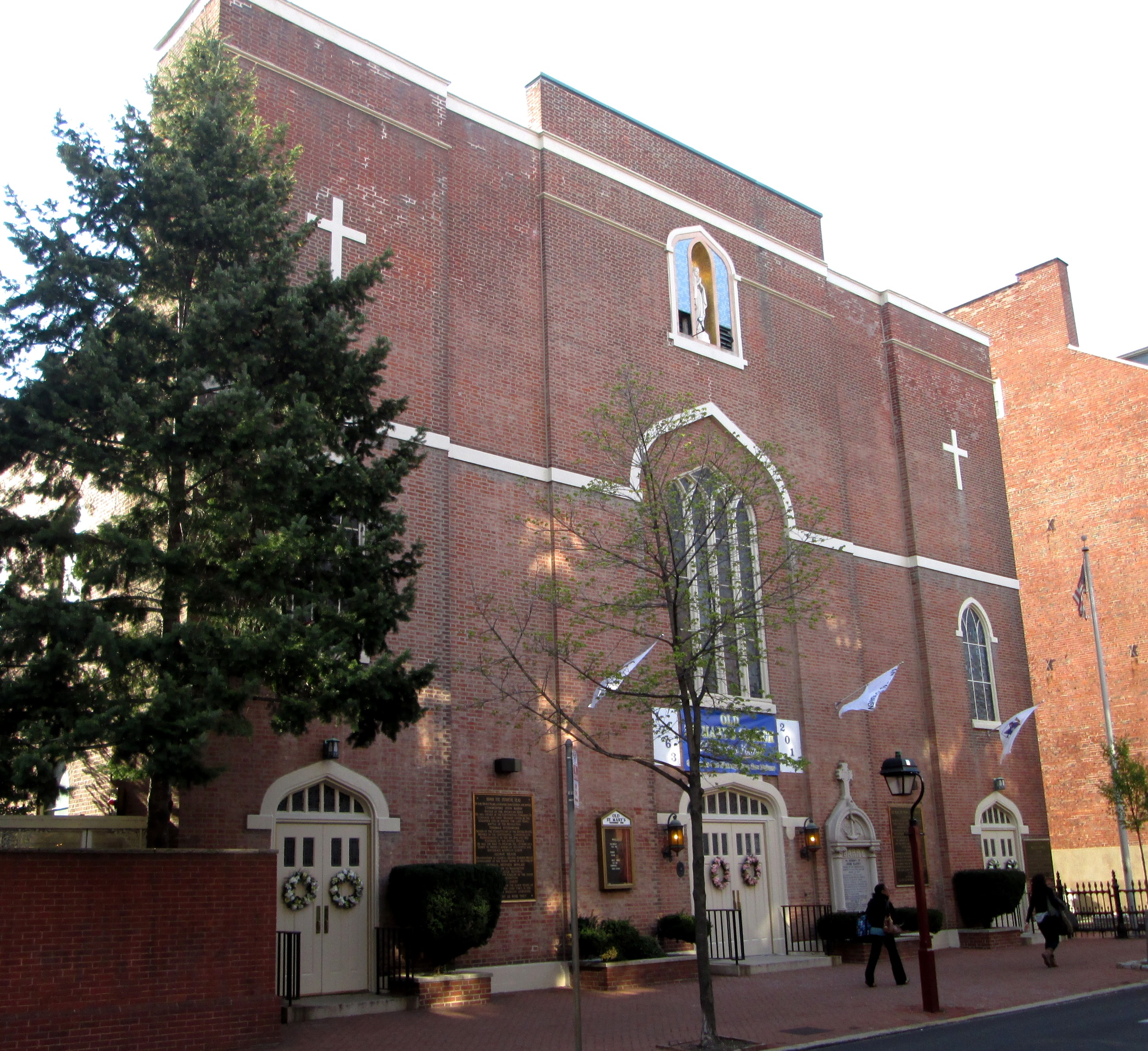
St. Mary's Church in Philadelphia was the centre of the disputes that overshadowed Conwell's episcopate.

Conwell arrived in Philadelphia on 2 December 1820. The trustee dispute had only grown more bitter during the vacancy preceding his arrival. Shortly before Conwell reached the diocese, a priest, William Hogan, approached de Barth (then administering the diocese until a bishop was appointed) about securing an assignment to preach in Philadelphia. After only a cursory investigation of his past, de Barth agreed, and Hogan was assigned to St. Mary's Church. Hogan quickly ingratiated himself with the laymen who made up the board of trustees, siding with them in their dispute with the other clergy. Hogan's general conduct created tension with Conwell. When Conwell arrived, Hogan had already moved out of the priests' residence at Old St. Joseph's Church to a house across the street, claiming that the original accommodations were poor; his detractors said he used the private residence to entertain women. The situation became public when Hogan announced from the pulpit one Sunday that neither Conwell nor anyone else had the right to say where he should live.

Later that week, Conwell called a meeting of the city's priests and announced that Hogan was suspended. The trustees took Hogan's side, while Conwell condemned the trustees as "despicable ex-Catholics" and "the worst sort of Jacobins". In the meantime, Conwell recalled a Dominican friar — William Vincent Harold, whom his predecessor had dismissed—to assist him. The St. Mary's trustees had quarrelled with Harold in the past, and his recall increased their mistrust of Conwell. The schism continued as St. Mary's refused to recognize Conwell's authority over them or Hogan, explicitly excluding Conwell from their board and electing Hogan in his place. Since they had rebelled against the Church hierarchy, Conwell declared Hogan excommunicated in a public statement on 27 May 1821.

In 1822, Conwell showed his support for Harold by appointing him as Vicar General of the diocese. The Hogan schism took on new dimensions, however, when Hogan was charged with rape and battery. Philadelphia mayor Robert Wharton presided over the trial, which captured the city's attention. Although the jury found him not guilty, Hogan's image was harmed. A letter from the Pope sided with Conwell but, after initially agreeing to leave the diocese, Hogan reversed himself and stayed on. The pro-Hogan faction prevailed at St. Mary's trustee elections that year amid bloody rioting between parish members. The next year, 1823, some Hogan supporters convinced a local woman to bring a paternity suit against Conwell, but the charges were dismissed quickly and the complainant was convicted of perjury. In an 1824 letter to the National Gazette, Hogan proposed the creation of an "American Catholic Church" with more independence from Rome. By this time, Hogan had begun to lose the trustees' support. At some point soon thereafter, he left the city.

In hopes of healing the schism, in October 1826, Conwell partially capitulated to the trustees, yielding to them the right of determining salaries and of vetoing his appointments. In return, they recognized him as bishop and senior pastor of the church. The bishop would henceforth appoint St. Mary's pastor, but the trustees would be permitted to arbitrate any disagreements on appointments before a neutral board.

=== Recall to Rome ===
The trustees soon renounced the agreement. When word of the compromise reached the Holy See, the Vatican also objected, condemning Conwell's surrender of episcopal rights. Harold, writing to Rome, claimed that Conwell had had little to do with the compromise, which he blamed on Father Michael Hurley and Conwell's Protestant lawyer, Josiah Randall. (Note: Josiah Randall would soon become the father of Samuel J. Randall, a future Speaker of the United States House of Representatives.) Conwell saw Harold's conduct as a betrayal, and removed him as Vicar General, appointing Hurley in his place. The trustees put aside their former enmity for Harold and took his side against Conwell, going so far as to petition Rome for Conwell's removal as bishop. By this time, as Arthur Ennis wrote in 1976, the "old and confused" Conwell considered leaving the diocese if he could secure another see in Ireland.

In 1827, the Vatican's Propaganda Fide formally rejected Conwell's pact with the trustees, condemning Hurley's role in the process, as well. They summoned Conwell to Rome. Ambrose Maréchal, who was now Archbishop of Baltimore, was ordered to oversee the diocese in Conwell's absence, and he appointed a priest from his diocese, William Matthews, as apostolic administrator. Conwell sailed for Rome on 22 July 1828. Once there, Conwell was ordered to give a report of all that had transpired. While forbidden to return to his diocese, he was promised that after a full explanation, he would be permitted to reside anywhere in Europe. He left Rome secretly in 1829, and when his absence was discovered, the Pope decreed he would be suspended from office if he returned to Philadelphia. Conwell did return to Philadelphia, however, in October of that year, and travelled from there to Baltimore, where the First Provincial Council of Baltimore was in session.

=== Retirement and death ===
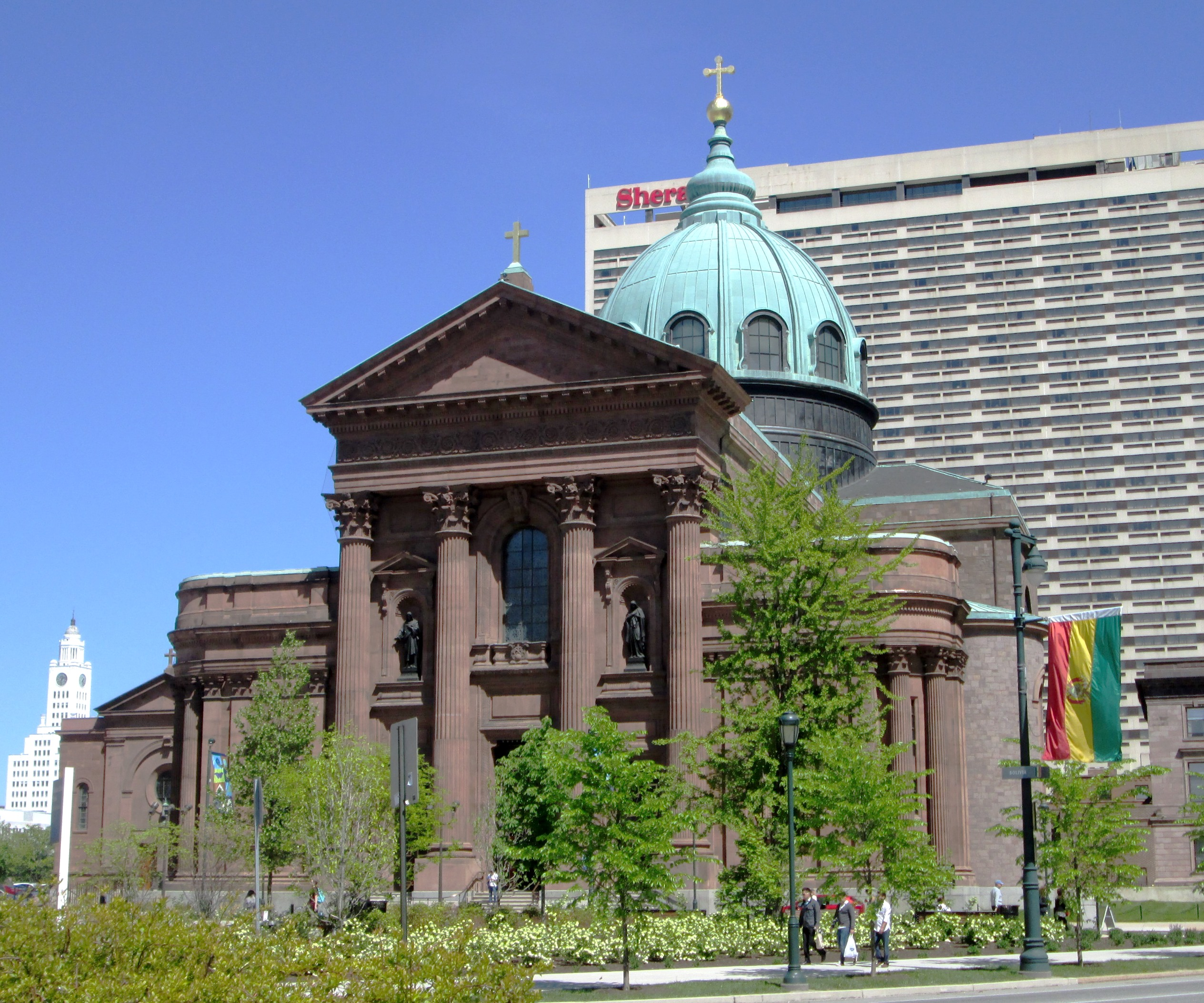
Conwell is buried in the crypt of the Cathedral Basilica of Saints Peter and Paul along with most other bishops of Philadelphia.

In Baltimore, Conwell professed his obedience to Rome and swore he would gladly retire from active governance of his diocese. The following year, the Vatican appointed Francis Kenrick as Conwell's coadjutor bishop with the right of succession and named him administrator of the diocese. Conwell never gave up his titles or his claim to exercise authority in the diocese, and his relationship with Kenrick remained rocky. He received permission to resume performing liturgical functions without any say in administration, and spent his remaining years in seclusion and prayer. He lived on for several years, although he lost his sight, preventing him from performing most of his few remaining duties.

Conwell died on 22 April 1842, at about the age of 94. Kenrick succeeded to the title of bishop of Philadelphia. Conwell's death led to one final controversy, as the old bishop's nephews and nieces sued for possession of the Bishop's Burial Ground, claiming it had been Conwell's private possession. Under threat of excommunication, they withdrew their claim. Conwell's remains were buried in St. Mary's churchyard. In 1864 the remains were transferred to the Cathedral Basilica of Saints Peter and Paul.

== Sources ==
Books

- Bransom, Charles N. (1990). Ordinations of U.S. Catholic Bishops, 1790–1989. Washington, D.C.: United States Catholic Conference. ISBN 1-55586-323-X.
- Ennis, Arthur J. (1976). "Chapter Two: The New Diocese". In Connelly, James F. (ed.). The History of the Archdiocese of Philadelphia. Wynnewood, Pennsylvania: Unigraphics Incorporated. pp. 63–112. OCLC 4192313.
- Loughlin, James (1908). "Henry Conwell". Catholic Encyclopedia. New York: Robert Appleton Company.
- Nolan, Hugh J. (1976). "Chapter Three: Francis Patrick Kenrick, First Coadjutor-Bishop". In Connelly, James F. (ed.). The History of the Archdiocese of Philadelphia. Wynnewood, Pennsylvania: Unigraphics Incorporated. pp. 113–208. OCLC 4192313.
- Shea, John Gilmary (1886). The Hierarchy of the Catholic Church in the United States. New York: The Office of Catholic Publications. ISBN 9781555863234. OCLC 8217858.

Articles

- Barr, Colin (June 2008). "'Imperium in Imperio': Irish Episcopal Imperialism in the Nineteenth Century". The English Historical Review. 123 (502): 611–650. doi:10.1093/ehr/cen161. JSTOR 20108543.
- Carey, Patrick (July 1978). "The Laity's Understanding of the Trustee System, 1785–1855". The Catholic Historical Review. 64 (3): 357–376. JSTOR 25020365.
- Griffin, Martin I.J. (1913). "Life of Bishop Conwell of Philadelphia [part]". Records of the American Catholic Historical Society of Philadelphia. 23 (1): 16–42.
- Griffin, Martin I.J. (1915). "Life of Bishop Conwell of Philadelphia [part]". Records of the American Catholic Historical Society of Philadelphia. 26 (1): 162–178.
- Hessinger, Rodney (Fall 2011). ""A Base and Unmanly Conspiracy" Catholicism and the Hogan Schism in the Gendered Religious Marketplace of Philadelphia". Journal of the Early Republic. 31 (3): 357–396. doi:10.1353/jer.2011.0033. JSTOR 41261629. S2CID 143910967.
- Luke, Brother (1940). "Calendar of the Letters of Rev. Eugene Conwell, C.C., Collon". Journal of the County Louth Archaeological Society. 9 (4): 290–337. doi:10.2307/27728517. JSTOR 27728517.
- MacAuley, Ambrose (1982). "The Appointments of Patrick Curtis and Thomas Kelly as Archbishop and Coadjutor Archbishop of Armagh". Seanchas Ardmhacha: Journal of the Armagh Diocesan Historical Society. 10 (2): 331–365. doi:10.2307/29740967. JSTOR 29740967.

Dissertation

- House, Albert V. (1934). The Political Career of Samuel Jackson Randall (Ph.D.). University of Wisconsin. OCLC 51818085.

Website

- "Code of Canon Law". Libreria Editrice Vaticana. 1983. Archived from the original on 2 April 2007.

Catholic Church titles
Preceded by Michael Francis Egan	Bishop of Philadelphia; 1819–1842	Succeeded by Francis Kenrick
