= St. Augustine Church (Philadelphia) =

Historic church in Pennsylvania, United States

Coordinates: 39.955538°N 75.146511°W

- St. Augustine's Catholic Church
- U.S. National Register of Historic Places
- Pennsylvania state historical marker
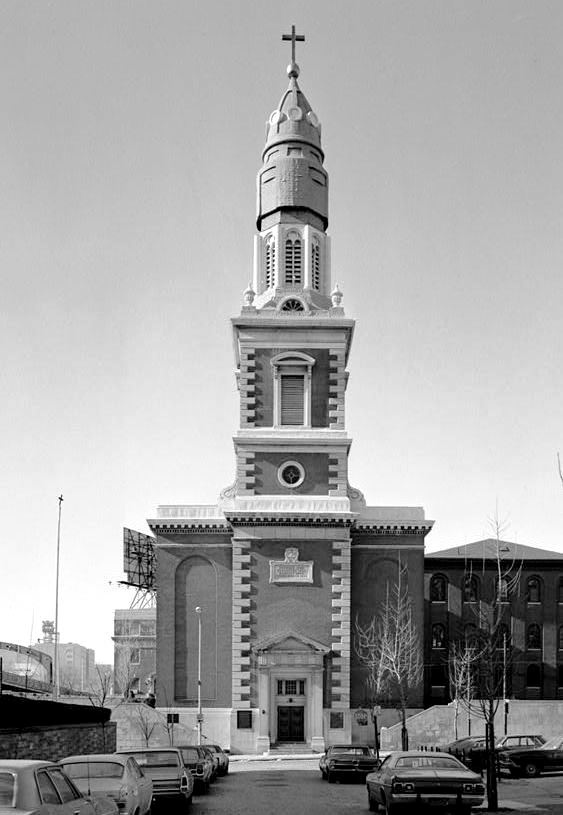
- St. Augustine Church in Philadelphia in 1974

- Location within Philadelphia Location within Pennsylvania Location within the United States
- Location: 4th and New Streets, Philadelphia, Pennsylvania, U.S.
- Area: 2 acres (0.81 ha)
- Built: 1847
- Architect: Napoleon LeBrun
- Architectural style: Palladian
- NRHP reference No.: 76001670

Significant dates
- Added to NRHP: June 15, 1976
- Designated PHMC: October 28, 1995

St. Augustine Catholic Church, also called Olde St. Augustine's, is an historic Catholic church in Philadelphia, Pennsylvania, United States. Consecrated in 1848, the Palladian-style church was designed by Napoleon LeBrun. It is listed on the National Register of Historic Places.

The church was built to replace the Old St. Augustine Church which was completed in 1801. The first Augustinian church founded in the United States, the original St Augustine housed the Liberty Bell's "Sister Bell". The church was burned down in the anti-Catholic Philadelphia Nativist Riots on May 8, 1844. The church sued the city of Philadelphia for not providing it with adequate protection. The money awarded to the church went to rebuilding the current church, which broke ground on May 27, 1847. Organizations founded by the church led to the creation of both Villanova University and the Philadelphia Orchestra.

== History ==
=== Old church ===
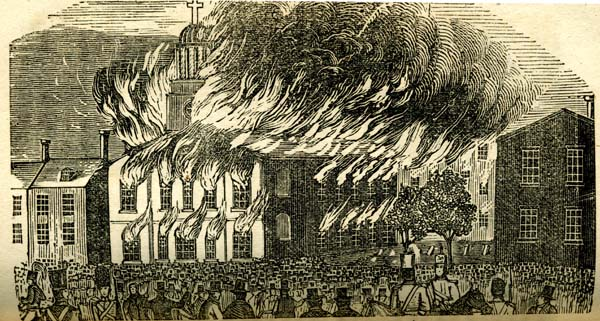
An 1844 illustration of St. Augustine Church on fire

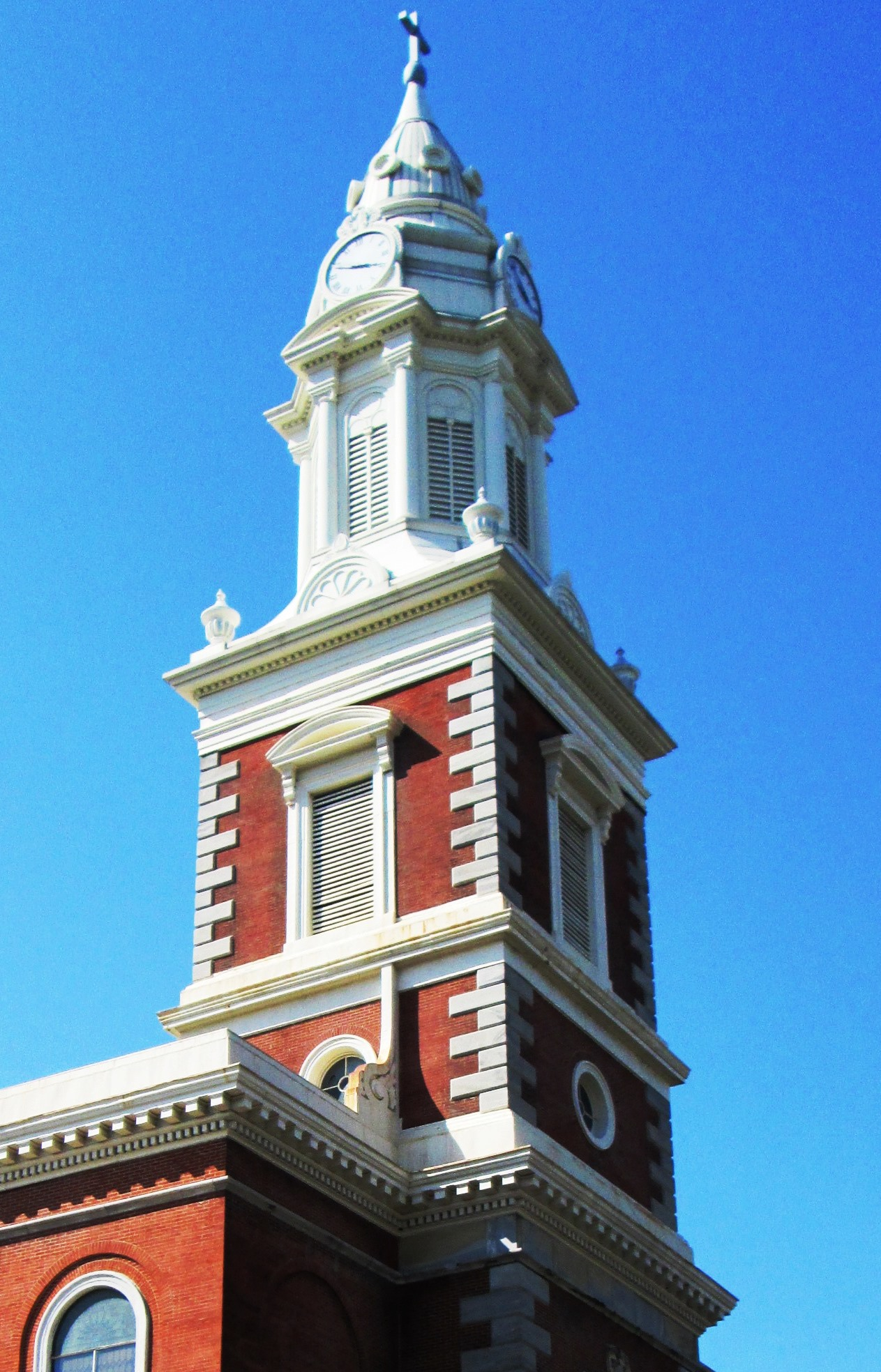
The church steeple in 2013

Fathers Matthew Carr and John Rosseter were sent to Philadelphia by the Catholic Church to buy land to build a church in the city. St. Augustine's Church began construction in 1796 to a design by Philadelphia architect Nicholas FitzMaurice Fagan (d. 1810) and was the first Order of Hermits of St. Augustine church founded in the United States. After delays as a result of yellow fever outbreaks among the workers and funding issues, the church was completed in 1801. Contributors for construction of St. Augustine's included President George Washington, John Barry, Stephen Girard, and Thomas Fitzsimons; the largest individual donation was $200 from merchant John Leamy.

In 1811, the St. Augustine Academy, a boys' school, was founded; the school included the largest theological library in the city. The origins of Villanova University are traced back to St. Augustine Academy.

The church became a center of musical activity in the city. In 1820 a musical celebration to raise funds for the church attracted attention and musicians around the United States.

On May 27, 1821, Bishop Henry Conwell excommunicated William Hogan at the church.

A cupola and tower were added to the church in 1829. Loaned to the church in the late 1820s by Independence Hall, the "Sister Bell", a bell that had been cast to replace the cracked Liberty Bell, was placed in St. Augustine's tower..

Violence beginning on May 6 in the Kensington District led to a mob gathering in front of St Augustine's Church on May 8. The city troops had stationed themselves near the church and Mayor John Morin Scott pleaded with the rioters for calm. Despite Mayor Scott's pleas, he was pelted with rocks and the church was set afire. The church was destroyed, the crowd cheering when the cupola fell. The St. Augustine Academy, including many of its rare books, was also destroyed.

=== Current church ===
During the three months after the church was destroyed, St. Augustine's congregation was allowed to use Old St. Joseph's Church. Three months after the riot, a new temporary church, the chapel of Our Lady of Consolation, was built and dedicated on October 27, 1844. This chapel fronted on Crown St., now N. Lawrence St., and adjoined St. Augustine's when the church was later rebuilt. Our Lady of Consolation was torn down in 1871 to make way for parish schools on Crown St. The friars of St. Augustine sued the city of Philadelphia for not providing the church enough protection during the riots, claiming US$80,000 in damages. The city argued that the friars could not claim their civil rights were violated as the Order of St. Augustine was a foreign organization under the authority of the Pope. The city also argued that the friars took a vow of poverty and could not be property owners. The Augustinians ended up proving the Order St. Augustine was incorporated in the US in 1804 and was awarded US$45,000.

The cornerstone of the new church was laid on May 27, 1847, and the church was completed in December 1848. The church was consecrated by Bishop Francis Kenrick and Archbishop John Hughes presided over High Mass on November 5, 1848. The church continued to be a center of musical activity. The building of the church's organ was overseen by Henry Gordon Thunder, Sr. who was organist at the church by at least 1852 and possibly as early as 1849. He served as the longtime organist at the church until his death in 1881 when he was succeeded by his son, Henry Gordon Thunder Jr. Henry Gordon Thunder Jr. founded the Choral Society of Philadelphia, which, along with musicians at the church, were involved in the organization of the Philadelphia Orchestra in 1900. Philadelphia's first performance of George Frideric Handel's Messiah was held at the church.

On June 15, 1976, St. Augustine's Church was listed on the National Register of Historic Places. By 1988 the congregation of St. Augustine had shrunk to fewer than a dozen. The 1990s saw the congregation grow with Filipino Catholics from Philadelphia and the city's suburbs. In December 1992 an exact replica of Santo Niño de Cebú was dedicated, and Filipinos have held a special mass and festivals for Santo Niño. Also in December 1992, a storm severely damaged the church's steeple. Debris from the steeple fell onto the Benjamin Franklin Bridge, which had to be closed for three days. The steeple had to be disassembled and removed. From the damaged roof, the church and art inside suffered water damage. A new steeple was erected on October 18, 1995.

St. Augustine's was featured in the 1999 thriller The Sixth Sense, and the 2007 action movie Shooter. In 2019, St. Augustine was featured in the film 21 Bridges.

== Architecture ==
The Old St. Augustine Church was designed by Nicholas FitzMaurice Fagan, whose father-in-law, lumber merchant John Walsh, provided most of the lumber for the church. The church, designed in Roman Style, was twenty-five feet long and sixty-two feet wide. Its interior included a life-sized statue of the Crucifixion (1810) by sculptor William Rush. The tower and cupola added in 1829 was designed by William Strickland, who also designed the Merchant's Exchange and the Second Bank of the United States.

The current church was designed by architect Napoleon LeBrun, who also designed the Academy of Music. The church is an example of Palladian architecture. The main arched altar consists of white marble with shafts of Mexican onyx that border the tabernacle. Framing the altar is an archway supported by Corinthian columns. Above the altar sits a domed skylight. Stained-glass windows, each dedicated to a saint, allow in light throughout the church.

== Art and frescoes ==
In 1848, Italian artist Nicola Monachesi (1795–1851) completed a series of frescoes at St. Augustine Church (Philadelphia), widely regarded as the earliest surviving church frescoes in the United States. Frescoes were officially recognized by the Pennsylvania Historical and Museum Commission and formally conferred through placement of a state-installed curbside historical marker. Among these works is *St. Augustine in His Glory*, a celestial composition portraying the saint ascending toward the divine light of the Trinity, represented by an equilateral triangle and surrounded by angels. His frescoes at St. Augustine were rediscovered during restoration efforts in the 1990s and subsequently listed in the Philadelphia Historical Commission’s Register of Historic Places.

== Gallery ==
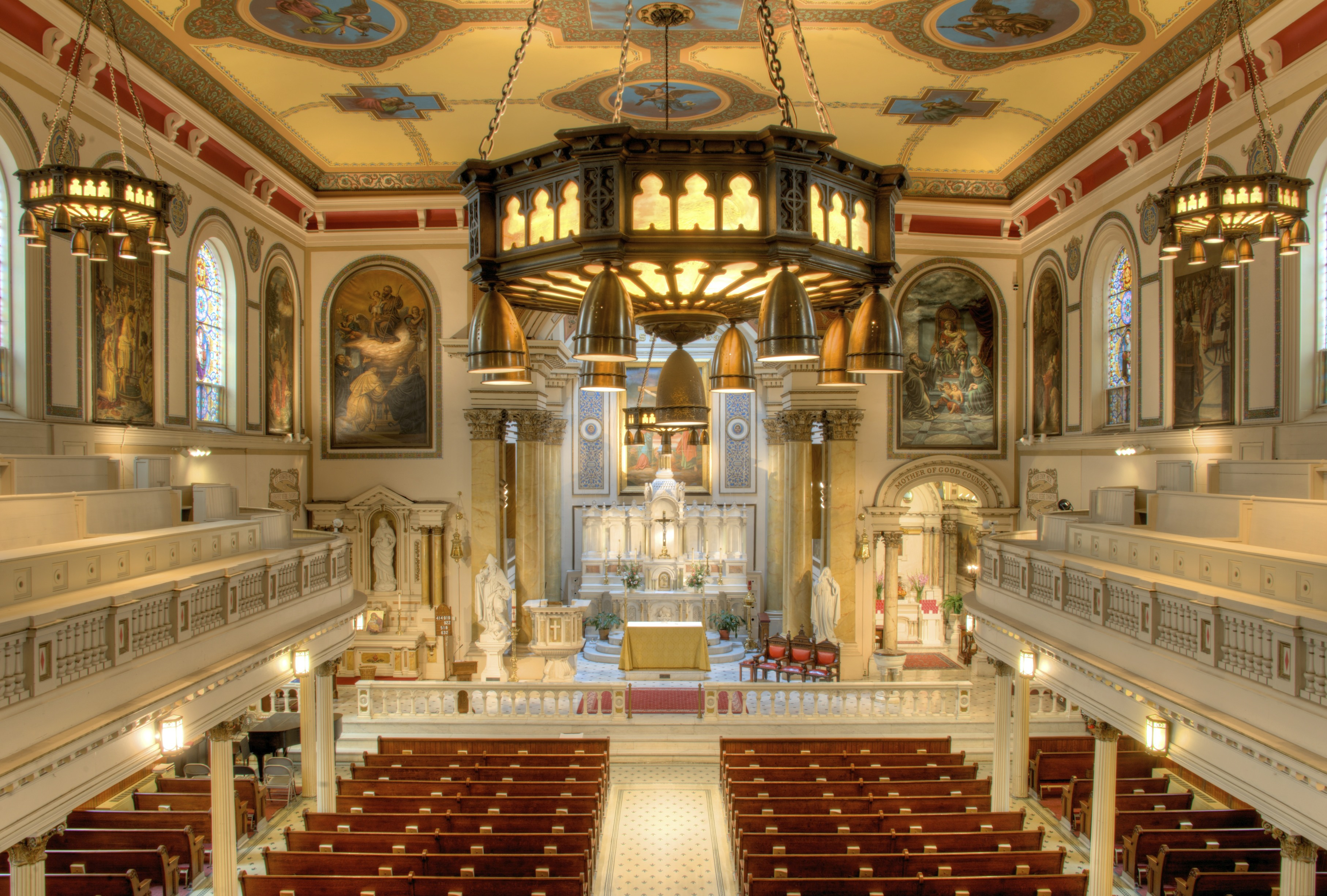
Interior, in 2014

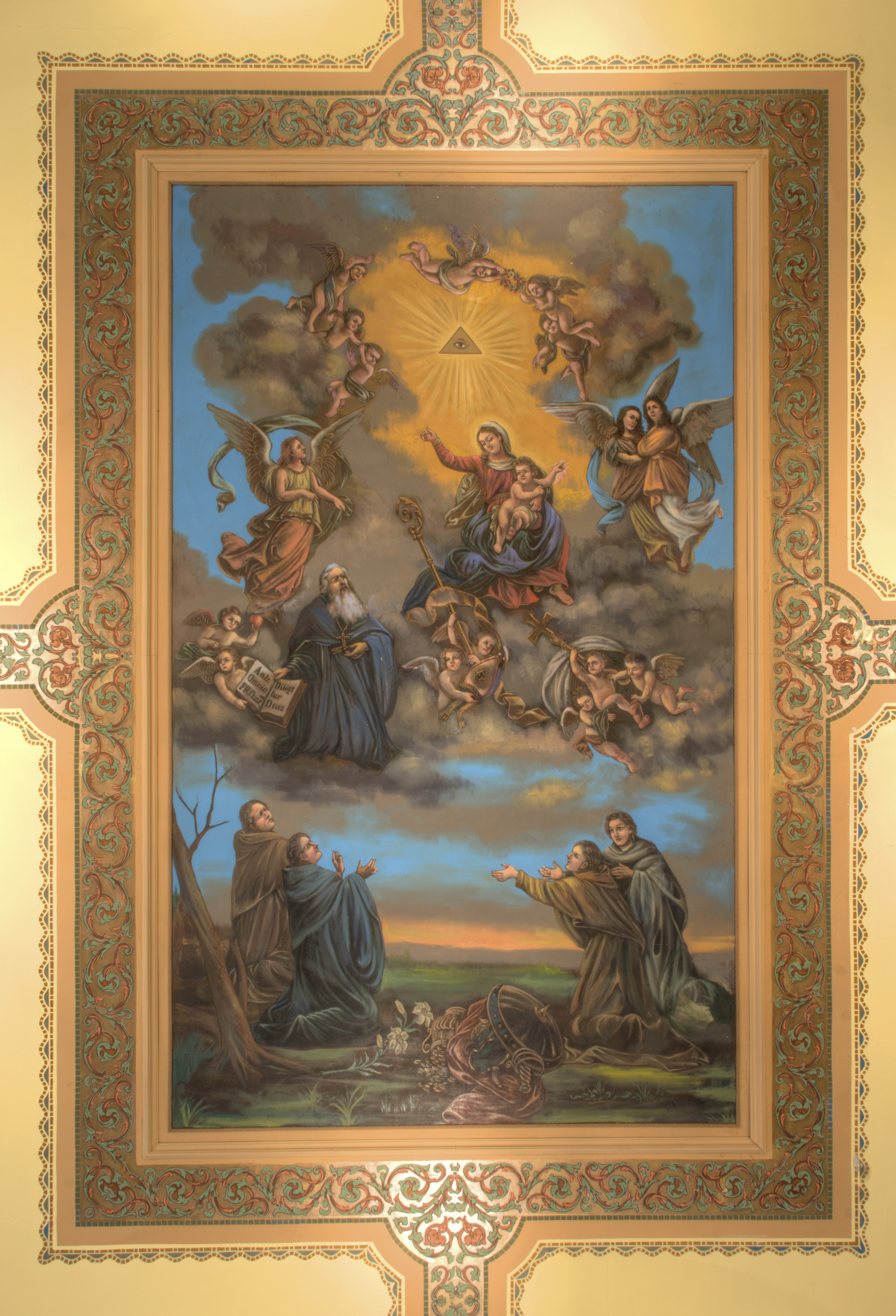
St. Augustine in His Glory, an 1848 fresco.

== See also ==
- Archdiocese of Philadelphia
- List of churches in Philadelphia
