= Francis Kenrick =

American Catholic bishop

The Most Reverend Francis Patrick Kenrick
- Archbishop of Baltimore
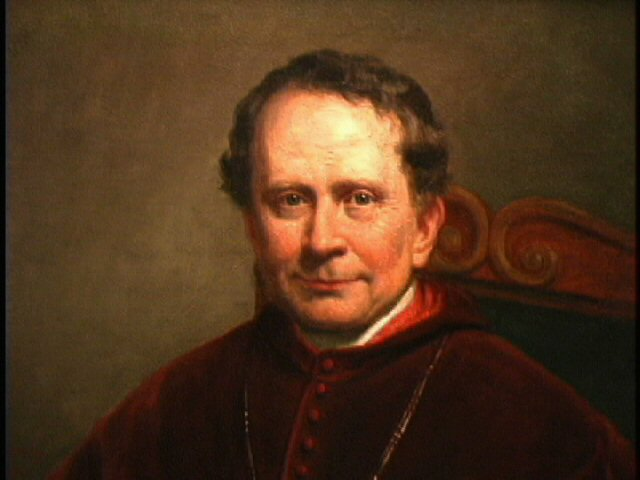
- See: Baltimore
- Appointed: August 19, 1851
- Installed: October 9, 1851
- Term ended: July 8, 1863
- Predecessor: Samuel Eccleston, S.S.
- Successor: Martin John Spalding
- Previous post: Bishop of Philadelphia (1842–51)

Orders
- Ordination: April 7, 1821 by Candido Maria Frattini
- Consecration: June 10, 1831 by Benedict Joseph Flaget S.S.

Personal details
- Born: December 3, 1797 Dublin, Kingdom of Ireland
- Died: July 8, 1863 (aged 65) Baltimore, Maryland, US
- Denomination: Roman Catholic Church
- Education: Pontifical Urbaniana University

Francis Patrick Kenrick (December 3, 1796 or 1797 – July 8, 1863) was an Irish-born Catholic prelate who served as bishop of Philadelphia (1842–1851) and archbishop of Baltimore (1851–1863).

Kenrick grew up in Ireland, where he received his early education. He then attended the Pontifical Urbaniana University in Rome, where he built a reputation as a theologian and scholar. After his ordination, he went to teach theology in the Diocese of Bardstown in the United States, where he became president of its seminary. Starting in 1830, Kenrick served as Coadjutor Bishop and later Bishop of Philadelphia, dealing with rebellious parish trustees and anti-Catholic riots in the city. He became Archbishop of Baltimore in 1851, serving there until his death in 1863.

Kenrick is known for his contributions to the American Catholic Church as a theologian and canon law scholar as well as for his introducing free parochial schools in the Diocese of Philadelphia and the Archdiocese of Baltimore.

== Biography ==
=== Early life and education ===
Francis Kenrick was born on December 3, 1796, in Dublin, Ireland, to Thomas and Jane (née Eustace) Kenrick. His younger brother, Peter Kenrick, became the first archbishop of the Archdiocese of St. Louis. The brothers' uncle, pastor of St. Nicholas of Myra Parish in Dublin, took an active role in their education. Francis Kenrick decided as a boy that he wanted to enter the priesthood. He attended elementary school and a so-called classical school in Dublin, where he achieved a strong academic record.

At age 18, Kenrick was selected to study at the Pontifical Urbaniana University in Rome, where he became a distinguished student in theology.

=== Ordination and ministry ===
Kenrick was ordained to the priesthood in Rome by Archbishop Candido Maria Frattini on April 7, 1821.Shortly after Kenrick's ordination, Bishop Benedict Joseph Flaget of the Diocese of Bardstown in the United States sent a request to the Vatican for young priests to staff St. Thomas Seminary in Bardstown, Kentucky. Then one of the youngest priests at the university, Kenrick volunteered for the assignment.

Once in Bardstown, Kenrick taught theology at St. Thomas for the next nine years. He also taught Greek and history at St. Joseph's College in Bardstown. He also engaged in missionary work in the diocese and held public debates on religion with Protestant ministers. He earned a reputation as an eloquent preacher and effective apologist, and was a recognized theologian and scripture scholar.

Flaget soon appointed Kenrick as his private secretary. When Flaget traveled to the First Provincial Council of Baltimore in 1829 in Baltimore, Maryland, Kenrick came along as his personal theologian. Kenrick also served as an assistant secretary at the provincial council.

=== Bishop of Philadelphia ===
On February 25, 1830, Pope Pius VIII appointed Kenrick coadjutor bishop of Philadelphia, and titular bishop of Arath to assist the ailing Bishops Henry Conwell. Kenrick received his episcopal consecration on June 6, 1830, from Flaget, with Conwell and Bishop John serving as co-consecrators, in Bardstown.

==== Trustee controversies ====
Kenrick immediately assumed full administrative control of the diocese, which had been in turmoil from a schism at St. Mary's Parish in Philadelphia. The parish trustees had rebelled against Conwell, who had removed their pastor due to his personal lifestyle. As bishop, Kenrick wanted to establish St. Mary's as his episcopal see, with himself as pastor. The trustees refused. In response, Kenrick placed St. Mary's under interdict. In a dramatic move, he celebrated mass at St. Mary's the next Sunday and exposed the machinations of the trustees to the congregation. After losing support in the parish, the trustees in May 1831 sent a letter to Kenrick, pledging their obedience.

Kenrick faced a similar trustee dispute in Pittsburgh, Pennsylvania, then part of the Diocese of Philadelphia, over the ownership of St. Paul's Church. When the trustees told him that they built the church and it belonged to them, Kenrick replied:

The church is yours. You have a perfect right to do what you please with it. I claim no right to interfere with any appropriation of it you wish to make. You may make of it, if you will, a factory, and I will not interfere. But there is one thing which I do tell you, and it is this: if you wish it to be a Catholic Church you must comply with the requirement of the law, which I have laid before you. Now do as you please.

To forestall future trustee conflicts with other parishes, Kenrick obtained passage of a law transferring church property from parish trustees to the bishop of Philadelphia.

==== Growth of diocese ====
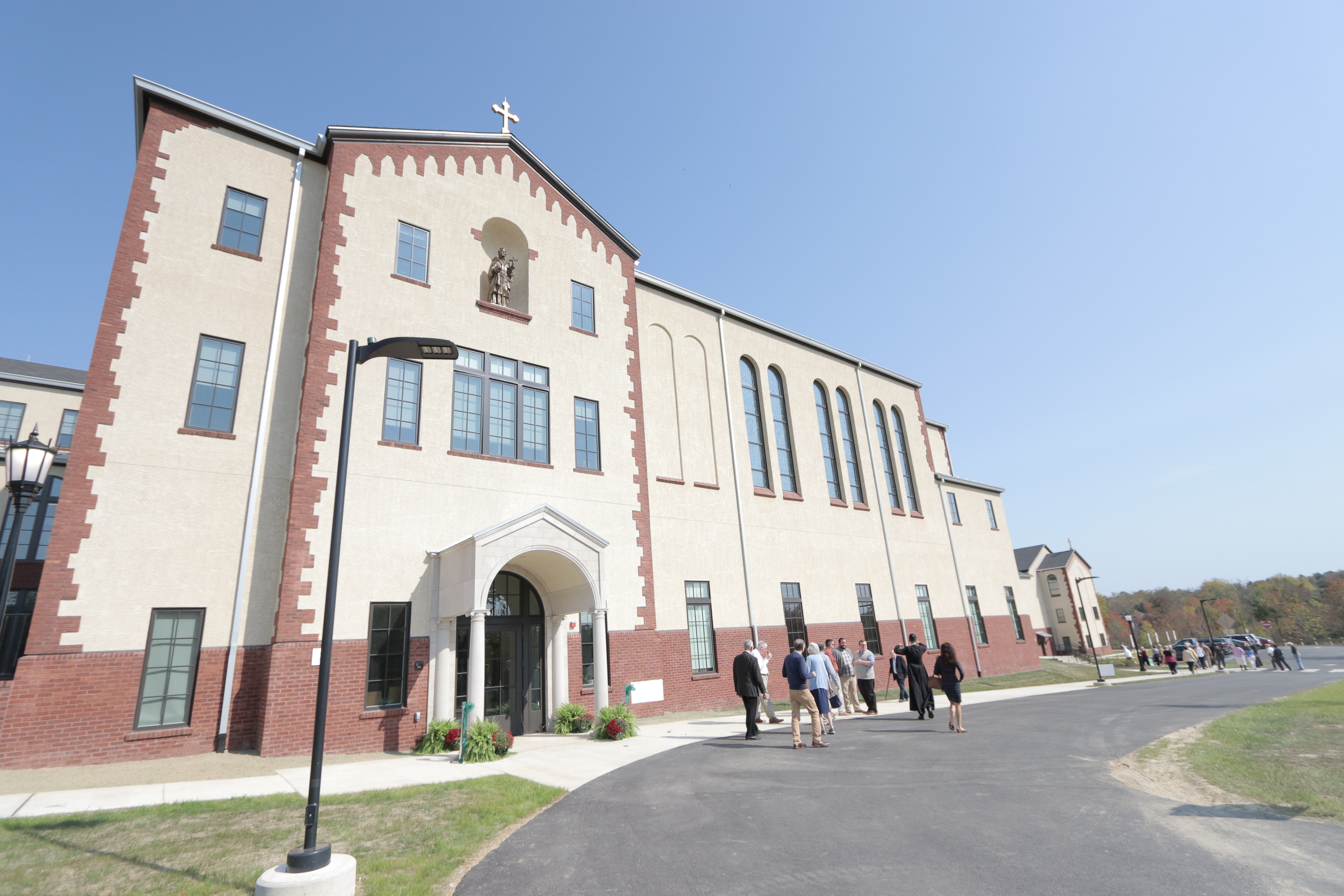
St. Charles Borromeo Seminary, Ambler, Pennsylvania (2024)

In June 1832, Kenrick founded St. Charles Borromeo Seminary for the preparation of seminarians, locating it at his personal residence in Philadelphia. The next month, cholera broke out in the city. The administrator of Blockley Almshouse, a homeless shelter and hospital in the city, asked Kenrick if the Sisters of Charity in Emmitsburg, Maryland, could send nurses to help. Reverend Michael Hurley, pastor of St. Augustine's Parish in Philadelphia, converted his church into a temporary hospital. After the epidemic passed in September 1832, Philadelphia Mayor John Swift praised Kenrick for his assistance.

With the strong growth of the Catholic population in Western Pennsylvania, Kenrick petitioned the Vatican to create a new diocese there in 1835. The Vatican was leaning toward creating the new diocese and also appointing Kenrick as coadjutor bishop of the Diocese of New York. When Kenrick expressed his opposition to the appointment, the Vatican dropped the coadjutor issue, along with that of the new diocese. The Vatican finally erected the Diocese of Pittsburgh on August 11, 1843.

==== Bible Riots ====
Title page, Douay Old Testament

As the Irish Catholic population rose in Philadelphia during the early 1840s, Protestant Scotch-Irish workers in the Kensington neighborhood of Philadelphia started worrying about losing jobs and housing. On November 10, 1842, Kenrick wrote to the Board of Controllers of public schools, asking the Philadelphia school system to allow Catholic children use the Catholic Douay Bible in class instead of a Protestant bible. He also asked that teachers excuse these children from non-Catholic religious teachings. As a result, the Board ordered that the schools make all religious activities optional and allow children to read whichever Bible was approved by their parents. However, nativist groups twisted these policy changes into misinformation to stir up their followers against the Irish.

On May 7, 1844, the American Republican Party, a nativist group, staged a rally near Kensington that triggered three days of rioting and bloodshed in the city. During the riot, nativist mobs burned St. Michael's and Saint Augustine's Catholic Churches. The theological library and rectory at St. Augustine's were also lost. The state militia quelled the disturbances on May 8. The riots reignited on July 6, 1844, lasting for two days.

Throughout the violence, Kenrick encouraged Catholics "to follow peace and have charity." He closed all Catholic churches in Philadelphia and suspended the celebration of Mass there. He encouraged his priests to avoid wearing clerical clothing when on the streets. Following the Bible riots, Kenrick realized that Catholic children needed to attend schools run by the church. He then initiated a parochial school system in Philadelphia to be administered by the archdiocese.

Between 1830 and 1850, the number of churches in the diocese grew from 22 to 92; priests from 35 to 101; charitable institutions from two to six; and the Catholic population from 35,000 to 170,000. In 1849, he purchased a farm in West Philadelphia for construction of Cathedral Cemetery. He also began construction on the Cathedral Basilica of Saints Peter and Paul and oversaw the rebuilding of St. Michael and St. Augustine following the Bible riots.

=== Archbishop of Baltimore ===
Following the death of Archbishop Samuel Eccleston on April 22, 1851, Pope Pius IX named Kenrick as archbishop of Baltimore on August 19, 1851. His installation took place in Baltimore on October 9, 1851. He presided over the First Plenary Council of Baltimore in 1852. As archbishop, Kenrick introduced free parochial schools in the archdiocese for all students, supported directly by the parishes.

In 1854, Pius IX invited Kenrick to attend the promulgation of the dogma of the Immaculate Conception in Rome. In 1858, the Sacred Congregation for the Propagation of the Faith, with the approval of Pius IX, conferred a "prerogative of place" on the archbishop of Baltimore. This meant that the archbishop of Baltimore had precedence over all other American archbishops and bishops, regardless of seniority in promotion or ordination. With the outbreak of the American Civil War in 1861, Kenrick told his priests to avoid all involvement in politics during the conflict, a position that he took also.

=== Death and legacy ===
Kenrick died at age 66 in Baltimore on July 8, 1863. According to reports, he was greatly distressed while reading earlier in the day about the carnage from the Battle of Gettysburg, which had taken place earlier that week in nearby Gettysburg, Pennsylvania. Kenrick is interred in the crypt of the Basilica of the National Shrine of the Assumption of the Blessed Virgin Mary in Baltimore.

Bishop Kenrick High School, opened in 1955 in Norristown, Pennsylvania, was named in honor of Francis Kenrick. It was succeeded in 1993 by Kennedy-Kenrick High School.

== Publications ==
- A new translation of the Douay Bible, with a commentary
- Theologia Moralis (3 Vols) (1860)
- The Primacy of the Apostolic See, Vindicated (1848)
- A Treatise on Baptism (1852)
- Theologia dogmatica. Secundis curis auctoris (1858)
- A Vindication of the Catholic Church, in a Series of Letters Addressed to the Rt. Rev. John Henry Hopkins (1855)

== See also ==
- Catholic Church hierarchy
- Catholic Church in the United States
- Historical list of the Catholic bishops of the United States
- List of Catholic bishops of the United States
- Lists of patriarchs, archbishops, and bishops

== Notes ==
- Parts of Francis Kenrick's Bible Translation
- Marschall, John P.,Francis Patrick Kenrick, 1851-1863: The Baltimore Years (Ph.D. diss., Catholic University of America, 1965)
- Spalding, Thomas W. The Premier See: A History of the Archdiocese of Baltimore, 1789-1989. Baltimore, MD: Johns Hopkins University Press, 1989

Catholic Church titles
Preceded by Henry Conwell	Bishop of Philadelphia; 1842–1851	Succeeded by John Nepomucene Neumann, C.Ss.R.
Preceded by Samuel Eccleston, S.S.	Archbishop of Baltimore; 1851–1863	Succeeded by Martin John Spalding
