= Fabrica ecclesiae =

Latin term describing the construction and maintenance of a church

In the Catholic Church, fabrica ecclesiæ (Latin for 'workshop of the church') is a term meaning, etymologically, the construction of a church, but in a broader sense the funds necessary for such construction.

This expression may also be used to designate the repairing and maintenance of churches, the daily expense of worship, and to the amount requisite for covering these expenses. In this particular connexion, the expression is first met with in the letter of Pope Simplicius to Gaudentius, Bishop of Aufina (19 November 475); however, even then it was not new, being borrowed from secular usage.

== History ==
During the first Christian centuries the temporalities intended to meet the expenses incurred by the religious services carried on throughout a diocese belonged entirely to the cathedral church, and constituted a common fund which the bishop used, at his option, in defraying the expenses of religion, supporting his ministers and caring for the poor.

But in the fifth century, particularly in Italy, this common fund was divided into four parts, one of which was set aside for the fabrica ecclesiæ. In Sicily however, in 494, no portion was especially reserved for the fabric, and in Gaul such an allotment seems to have been unknown. In Spain, a third of the ecclesiastical revenues was assigned to the luminare (lights), a term synonymous with fabrica.

The increase of Christianity in the rural districts brought with it a change of discipline, according to which each church obtained a separate patrimony. In fact, benefactors no longer bestowed their gifts on the entire diocese, but on one particular church, frequently in honour of some saint specially venerated there. The common fund itself was divided among the churches of the diocese. Some writers maintain this division was owing to the establishment of ecclesiastical benefices; others claim that it followed the canonical recognition of the private ownership of churches.

After vainly endeavouring to restrict the exercise of public worship to churches whose ownership had been completely renounced by the founders, the canon law eventually permitted public worship in churches that remained the private property of an individual, a monastery or even the episcopal mensa, or estate. The owner was however obliged to set apart a special fund for the needs of the church (pro sertis tectis, or for the luminare). Henceforth, when a bishop established a new parish, he was bound to provide for its needs by a specified income to be deducted from the common diocesan estate or fund–of course, if no benefactor had otherwise endowed the parish. Some hold that in consequence of the principles governing feudal society all medieval churches and their revenues became private property, and that the conflict of Pope Gregory VII and his successors against the Holy Roman Emperors concerning lay investitures was in reality an effort to restore its lost possessions to the ecclesiastical domain. The result of so much strife was the transformation of former proprietary rights into the Jus patronatus 'right of patronage'.

While ecclesiastical ownership was going through these phases, the canon law decided who must contribute to the maintenance of a particular church, i.e. its owner, and all recipients of its revenues (Synod of Frankfort, 794); under pain, therefore, of forfeiting his right of patronage, the patron of a church must share the burden of its maintenance; so too the incumbent of the ecclesiastical benefice and those to whom the tithes have been granted (decimatores). Finally, when the resources of the church were insufficient, the faithful themselves were bound to contribute to the expenses of Divine worship. These provisions were sanctioned by the Decretals of Gregory IX (cc. i and iv de ecclesiis ædificandis, III, 48), and by the Council of Trent (Sess. XXI, de ref. c. vii); they represent in this matter the common ecclesiastical law.

== Officials ==
The fabrica ecclesiæ means also the persons charged with the administration of church property, usually laymen. Their organization has differed from one country to another, nor have they been uniformly organized in the same country. Churches subject to the right of patronage and those incorporated, even for temporal administration, with monasteries, were more closely affected than other churches by this condition of dependency. In such churches the patron occasionally appointed an officer to administer the temporalities. It is commonly believed that "church fabrics" do not antedate the thirteenth century. In the first ages of the Church the bishop administered church property with the aid of deacons and priests, but during the fourth century there appeared in the Orient and in certain countries of the West bursars (œconomi) who, subject to the direction of the bishop, managed the temporal affairs of churches; in other countries the bishop continued to administer the church property with the assistance of some trustworthy man of his choice.

When each church came to have its own particular patrimony, the bishop was naturally obliged to turn over the administration of such property to the local clergy, reserving nevertheless a right of control. During the long Investitures conflict this right, it may be, was completely annihilated; when peace was restored the clergy were often obliged to appeal to the inhabitants of the parish to defray the expenses of religion. In France and England especially, the assembled parishioners established the portion of expenses that ought to be borne by the community; naturally this assembly was henceforth consulted in regard to the most important acts connected with the administration of the parish temporalities. For that purpose it selected lay delegates who participated in the ordinary administration of the ecclesiastical property set aside for parochial uses. They were called vestrymen, churchwardens, procurators (procuratores), mambours (mamburni), luminiers, gagers, provisores, vitrici, operarii, altirmanni etc.

In the councils of the thirteenth century frequent mention is made of laymen, chosen by their fellow laymen to participate in the administration of temporal affairs; at the same time the rights of the parish priest and of ecclesiastical authority were maintained. A reaction is visible in the councils of the fourteenth, fifteenth and sixteenth centuries which undertake to check the tendency towards an exclusively lay administration of the parochial property.

Eventually the Council of Trent (Sess. XXII de ref. c. ix) admitted participation in the administration of ecclesiastical property, but demanded that at all times and in all places the lay administrators render an annual account to the bishop or to his delegate. As no general law has determined either the competency or the composition of fabric committees (conseils de fabrique) there has been in this respect very great variations. In modern times secular power has frequently interfered in the administration of ecclesiastical property set apart for purposes of worship, and in the organization of church fabrics. In most European countries, the State regulates the administration of ecclesiastical property, and the proceedings of church fabrics.

== Opera ==
Opera is a term commonly used in Tuscany (Italy) to describe the fabrica ecclesiae foundations. The general term in use in Italy is Fabbriceria, but local entities use Opera, instead, or Fabbrica or Cappella or Maramma, depending on the Region.

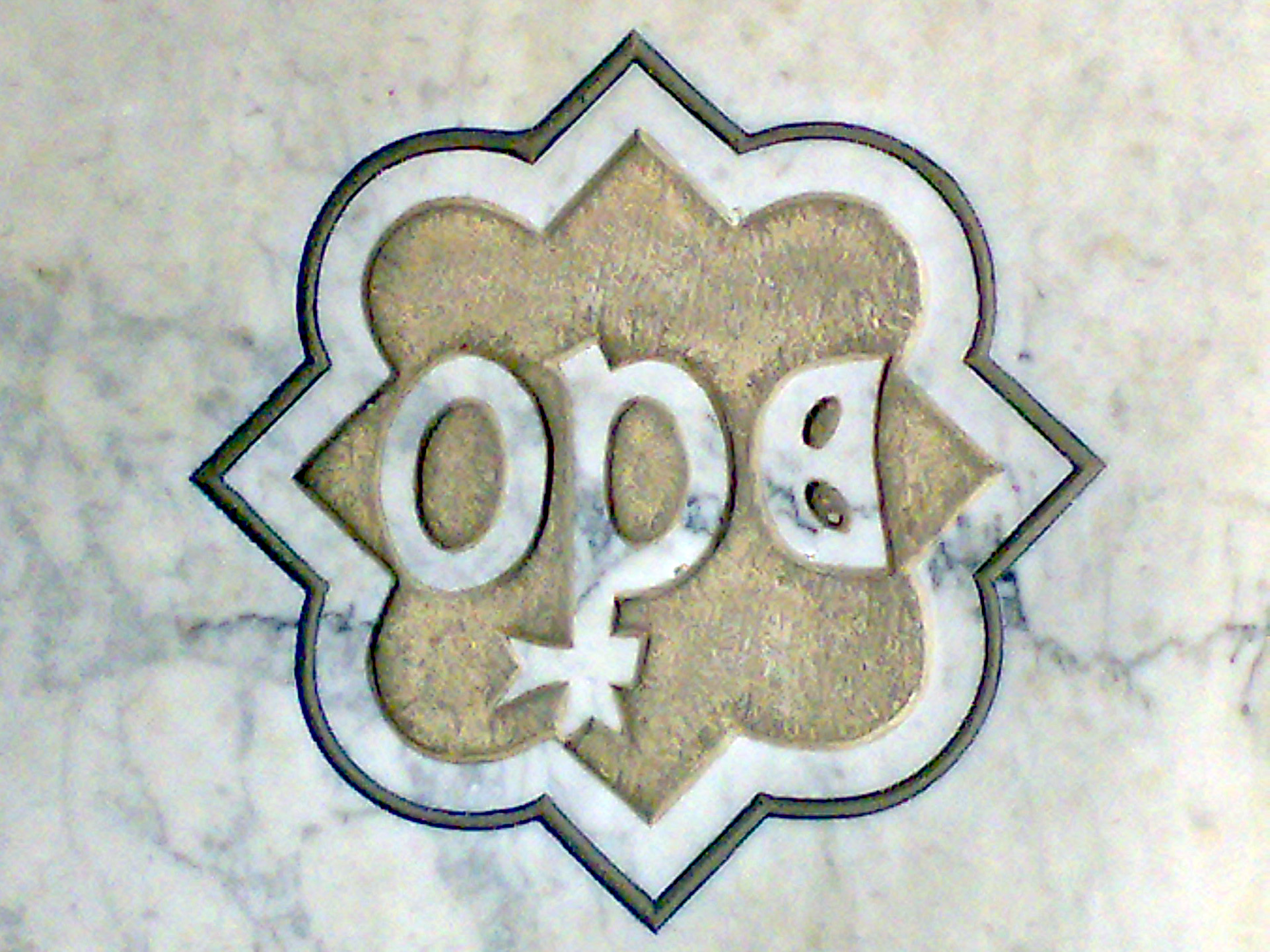
Opera logo. Reading is: O PER Æ that means by Opera

Operas are a confessional foundation, led by a laical deputation elected in part from the bishop and in part from Ministry of the Interior. This is and old heritage of the highly diversified nature of Fabrica ecclesiae foundation all over Italy. Originally they were designated by bishops who wanted to separate their spiritual affairs from pecuniary ones but, in the centuries, people from the local administrations entered the deputations. In the past was very important to have control of a fabrica, because they managed the commerce of cereals and had possession of several palaces, it was like being a second Lord of the city. Nowadays fabricas are only intended to keep their buildings with restoration works, maintenance, surveillance and letting conduct daily religious services without interfering. Most of fabricas are under Associazione Fabbricerie Italiane a national association founded in 2007. The following fabricas are part of the Associazione Fabbricerie Italiane:

- Opera Laicale della Cattedrale di Chiusi (Cathedral of Chiusi)
- Opera di Santa Croce di Firenze (Church of Santa Croce of Florence))
- Opera Santa Maria del Fiore di Firenze (Cathedral of Florence)
- Veneranda Fabbrica del Duomo di Milano (Cathedral of Milan)
- Opera del Duomo di Orvieto (Cathedral of Orvieto)
- Fabbriceria della Basilica Cattedrale di Parma (Cathedral of Parma)
- Fabbriceria della Chiesa Cattedrale Monumentale di S. Stefano Martire in Pavia (Cathedral of Pavia)
- Fabbriceria della Chiesa Cattedrale di Pienza (Cathedral of Pienza)
- Opera della Primaziale Pisana (Cathedral of Pisa)
- Opera del Duomo di Prato della Chiesa Cattedrale Monumentale di S. Stefano (Cathedral of Prato)
- Opera della Metropolitana di Siena (Cathedral of Siena)
- Fabbriceria della Sagrestia della Cattedrale di Todi (Cathedral of Todi)
- Procuratoria di San Marco di Venezia (Cathedral of Venice)
- Opere Ecclesiastiche Riunite di Montepulciano (Cathedral of Montepulciano)
- Fabbriceria del Duomo di Monreale (Cathedral of Monreale)
