= William Hogan (priest) =

19th century American priest

William Hogan was an American former Roman Catholic priest.

Hogan was born in Ireland and educated at Maynooth College. He became a priest before emigrating to the United States in 1819. Originally working as a priest of Albany, New York, he came to Philadelphia and was admitted to the diocese by the diocesan administrator. John England described him as "deficient in the most common branches of an English education".

Assigned to St. Mary's parish in Philadelphia, Hogan proved himself a popular priest. According to James Loughlin, he was a man of fine personal presence, an affluent talker, and a born demagogue. Hogan soon ran afoul of Bishop Henry Conwell, who disapproved of his vigorous social life. When Hogan resisted Conwell's attempts to rein him in, Conwell suspended him. The trustees of St. Mary's rushed to Hogan's defense and Conwell soon had a full-blown schism on his hands. He eventually excommunicated Hogan in 1821 and then, like many American bishops in the 1820s, wrested control of the parish from the lay trustees.

Following his excommunication, Hogan managed a circus, studied law, and married twice, before reemerging in the 1840s as a leading voice of anti-Catholicism. He went on the lecture circuit, wrote belligerent essays in popular journals, and published in 1851 a book entitled Popery as It Was and as It Is. The general tone of the latter is conveyed in the following statement: "I am sorry to say, from my knowledge of Roman Catholic priests ... that there is not a more corrupt, licentious body of men in the world."

== Works ==
- Auricular Confession and Popish Nunneries, 1854
