= Trusteeism =

U.S. Catholic parish administration system

Trusteeism and the trustee system are practices and institutions within certain parishes of the Catholic Church in the United States, under which laypersons participate in the administration of Ecclesiastical Property. When laypersons are among the trustees, the Church seeks agreement with the civil authorities to have the property administered under principles of canon law.

The Church often appoints deputies who are responsible to herself. Technically, such administrators, whether cleric or lay, are called the "fabric" of the Church (Fabrica Ecclesiae).

== History ==
In very early times ecclesiastical goods were divided into three or four portions, and that part set aside for the upkeep of the Church began to take on the character of a juridical person. The Eleventh Council of Carthage in 407 requested the civil power to appoint five executors for ecclesiastical property, and in the course of time laymen were called on to take their share in this administration, with the understanding, however, that everything was to be done in the name and with the approbation of the Church.

A number of early and medieval synods have dealt with the administration of curators of ecclesiastical property. The employment of laymen in concert with clerics as trustees became common all over Christendom.

In England such officials were called churchwardens. They were generally two in number, one being chosen by the parish priest, the other by the parishioners, and with them were associated others called sidesmen. The churchwardens administered the temporalities of the parish under the supervision of the bishop, to whom they were responsible. An annual report on the administration of church property was made obligatory in all countries by the Council of Trent: "The administrators, whether ecclesiastical or lay, of the fabric of any church whatsoever, even though it be a cathedral, as also of any hospital, confratemity, charitable institution called mont de piété, and of any pious places whatsoever, shall be bound to give in once a year an account of their administration to the Ordinary."

== Fabric of the Church ==
The fabric of the church is distinct from the foundation of the benefice, and sometimes the fabric, in addition to the goods destined for the upkeep of divine worship, possesses also schools and eleemosynary institutions. All lay trustees must be approved by the bishop, and he retains the right of removing them and of overseeing the details of their administration.

In countries in which the church organization was entirely swept away by Protestant Reformation period, as in the British Isles, laymen are less generally employed. In Holland, laymen were admitted to a share in the administration of church temporalities by a decree of the Propaganda. The bishop is to nominate the members of the board, over which the parish priest is to preside. Trustees hold office for four years and may be reappointed at the expiration of that term. When a vacancy occurs the board presents two names to the bishop, from which he selects one. In necessary cases the bishop may dismiss any member and even dissolve the entire board of trustees. In this instance, as in all others where laymen are in question, the Holy See is careful to guard the prescriptions of the sacred canons as to the management and ownership of church goods (see administrator (of ecclesiastical property)).

== United States ==
In the United States the employment of lay trustees was customary in some parts of the country from a very early period. The practice of lay trusteeism in Catholic parishes was influenced by the polity of Congregational churches. Dissensions sometimes arose with the ecclesiastical authorities, and the Holy See has intervened to restore peace. Pope Pius VII vindicated the rights of the Church as against the pretensions of the trustees, and Pope Gregory XVI declared: "We wish all to know that the office of trustees is entirely dependent upon the authority of the bishop, and that consequently the trustees can undertake nothing except with the approval of the ordinary."

The Third Plenary Council of Baltimore laid down certain regulations concerning trustees: It belongs to the bishop to judge of the necessity of constituting them, their number and manner of appointment; their names are to be proposed to the bishop by the parish rector; the appointment is to be made in writing and is revocable at the will of the bishop; the trustees selected should be men who have made their Easter duty, who contribute to the support of the Church, who send their children to Catholic schools, and who are not members of prohibited societies; nothing can be done at a board meeting except by the consent of the rector who presides; in case of disagreement between the trustees and the rector, the judgment of the bishop must be accepted. A decree of the Congregation of the Council declares that the vesting of the title to church property in a board of trustees is a preferable legal form, and that in constituting such boards in the United States, the best method is that in use in New York, by which the Ordinary, his vicar-general, the parish priest, and two laymen approved by the bishop form the corporation.

== Legal standing of trustees ==
The legal standing of church trustees according to British law is treated by Taunton, "The Law of the Church", pp. 15, 315. In the United States the legal rights of trustees vary slightly in different States, but the following prescriptions (selected from Scanlan, "The Law of Church and Grave") hold almost everywhere: When the statute provides that two lay members of the corporation shall be appointed annually by the committee of the congregation, the members of the congregation have no right to elect said two members, and those appointed in the proper manner are lawful officers. When the election of new trustees is invalid, the old trustees hold over until there shall have been a valid election of their successors. The president and secretary of a church corporation have no authority to make a promissory note unless authorized by the board of trustees. When the laws of the organization give control of matters to the board of trustees, the majority of the members of the church cannot control the action of the trustees contrary to the uses and regulations of the church. A court has no authority to control the exercise of the judgment or discretion of the officers of a church in the management of its funds so long as they do not violate its constitutions or by-laws. Excommunication does not always remove an officer of a church corporation. The legal rights of a bishop in regard to the temporalities of a church, where they are not prescribed by the civil law, must rest, if at all, upon the ecclesiastical law, which must be determined by evidence. When property is conveyed to a church having well-known doctrine, faith, and practice, a majority of the members has not the authority or power, by reason of a change of religions views, to carry the property thus designated to a new and different doctrine. The title to church property is in that part of the congregation which acts in harmony with the law of the denomination; and the ecclesiastical laws and principles which were accepted before the dispute began are the standard for determining which party is right.

== Recent issues in the United States ==
In 2005, an interdict was issued to board members of St. Stanislaus Kostka Church (St. Louis, Missouri) in an attempt to get them to turn over the church property to the Roman Catholic Archdiocese of St. Louis.

In 2006, a priest was accused of stealing $1.4 million from his parish, prompting a debate over Connecticut Raised Bill 1098 as a means of forcing the Catholic church to manage money differently.

Another concern related to disputes over property ownership is whether the dioceses follow for parish suppression. In some cases, parishes have been liquidated and the assets taken by the diocese instead of being distributed to nearby parishes, which in violation of church financial rules.
