= Old St. Joseph's Church =

Historic Roman Catholic church and parish in Philadelphia

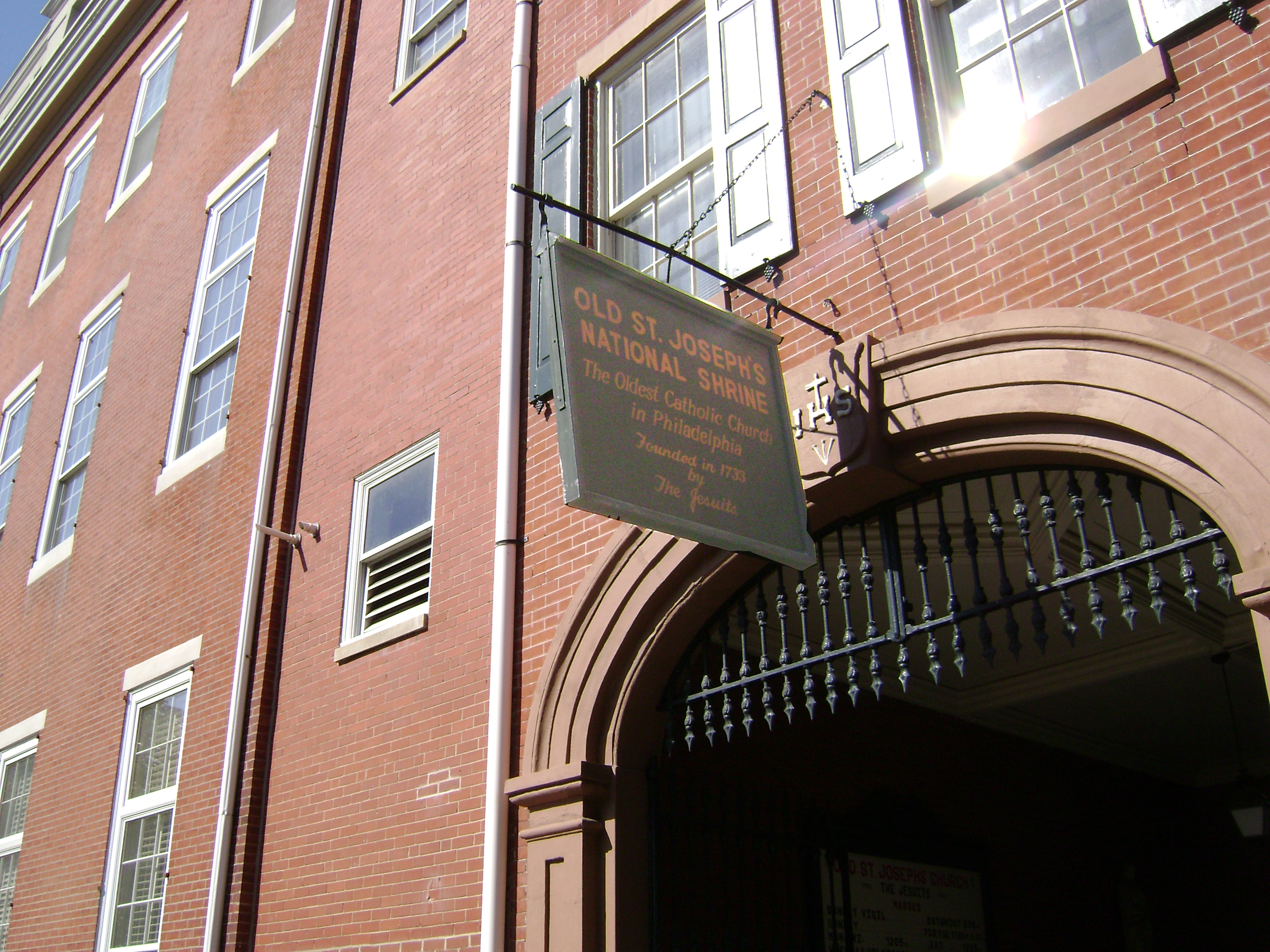
- Old St. Joseph's Church in Philadelphia in October 2009
- Old St. Joseph's Church
- 39.946445°N 75.147597°W
- Location: 321 Willings Alley, Philadelphia, Pennsylvania, 19106
- Country: United States
- Denomination: Catholic Church
- Website: oldstjoseph.org

History
- Founded: 1733
- Founder(s): Fr. Joseph Greaton, S.J.
- Dedicated: February 9, 1839 (current building)

Architecture
- Architect: John Darragh

Administration
- Diocese: Archdiocese of Philadelphia

Clergy
- Vicar(s): Fr. Matthew F. Roche, S.J. Br. Robert Carson, S.J.
- Pastor(s): Fr. Francis T. Hannafey, S.J.

Old St. Joseph's Church is a church in Philadelphia, Pennsylvania, and was the first Roman Catholic church in the city. The church was founded in 1733; the current building was dedicated in 1839.

== History ==
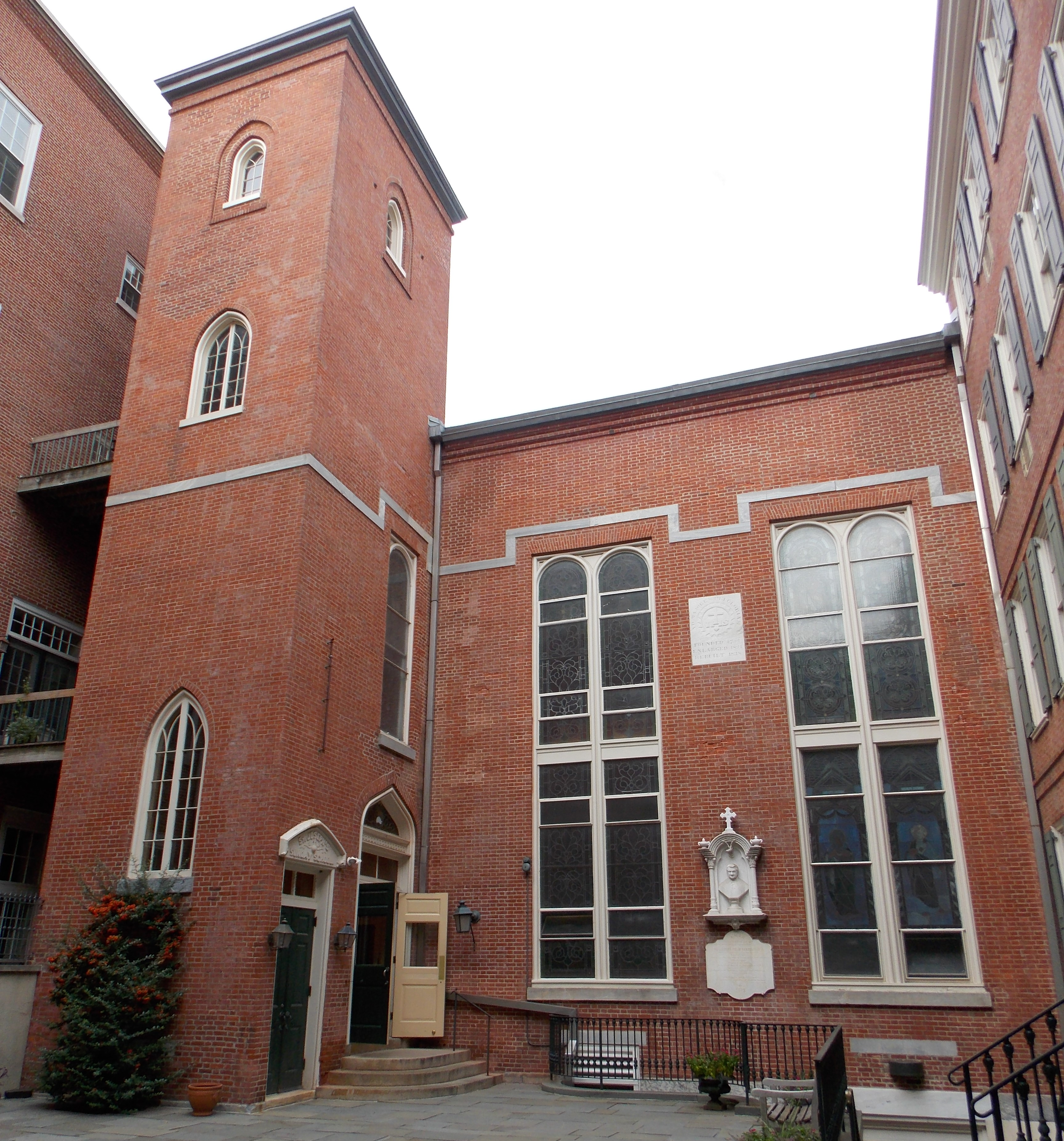
The church's exterior

Old St. Joseph's Church was founded by Joseph Greaton (1679–1753), an English Jesuit who came to Philadelphia from Maryland in 1729 to establish a mission. He originally celebrated mass in his house at 321 Willings Alley. Father Greaton built the first chapel in 1733, almost certainly a house-chapel attached to his residence.

The right of Roman Catholics in the Province of Pennsylvania to worship at the Romish Chapel was challenged the following year by the deputy governor of Pennsylvania. The Pennsylvania Provincial Assembly ultimately decided not to ban celebration of Mass and cited William Penn's Charter of Privileges as controlling, despite the English penal laws. Nowhere else in the Thirteen Colonies could Catholics enjoy public worship to the extent possible in 18th-century Philadelphia, with Anthony Andreassi of America noting that upon its establishment, it was "the only place in the English-speaking world where it was legal to celebrate Mass publicly."

In 1757, the chapel was replaced by a larger church. The Marquis de Lafayette and the Comte de Rochambeau both worshiped at St. Joseph during their time in America. Men from the American and French armies celebrated high mass at St. Joseph's after the victory at Yorktown.

In 1793, a yellow fever epidemic swept the central area of Philadelphia, killing a tenth of the population. Old St. Joseph's established an orphanage to care for some of the many children left without families due to the epidemic. Fathers Egan, Carr and Hurley, James Oellers, Cornelius Tiers, Joseph Eck and John F. Hoares were among the most active benefactors of the orphans. At a meeting in 1806 by sanction of father Egan it was resolved to form : The Roman Catholic Society of St Joseph for the Maintenance and Education of Orphans, page 118 The church became racially integrated in the 1790s when slaves fleeing a revolution in Santo Domingo settled in Philadelphia and some joined the church. St. Mary's Charity School educated these immigrants, ultimately leading to the establishment of St. Peter Claver School in Philadelphia in the 19th century.

Nearby St. Mary's Church, built in 1763, was used for grander occasions, and was visited by public dignitaries such as George Washington and John Adams.

== Parish ==
Old St. Joseph's Church remains an active parish of the Roman Catholic Archdiocese of Philadelphia, run by the Jesuit fathers, with Daily Mass at 12:05pm Monday through Saturday, and Sunday Masses at 7:30am, 9:30am, and 11:30am.

== Architecture ==
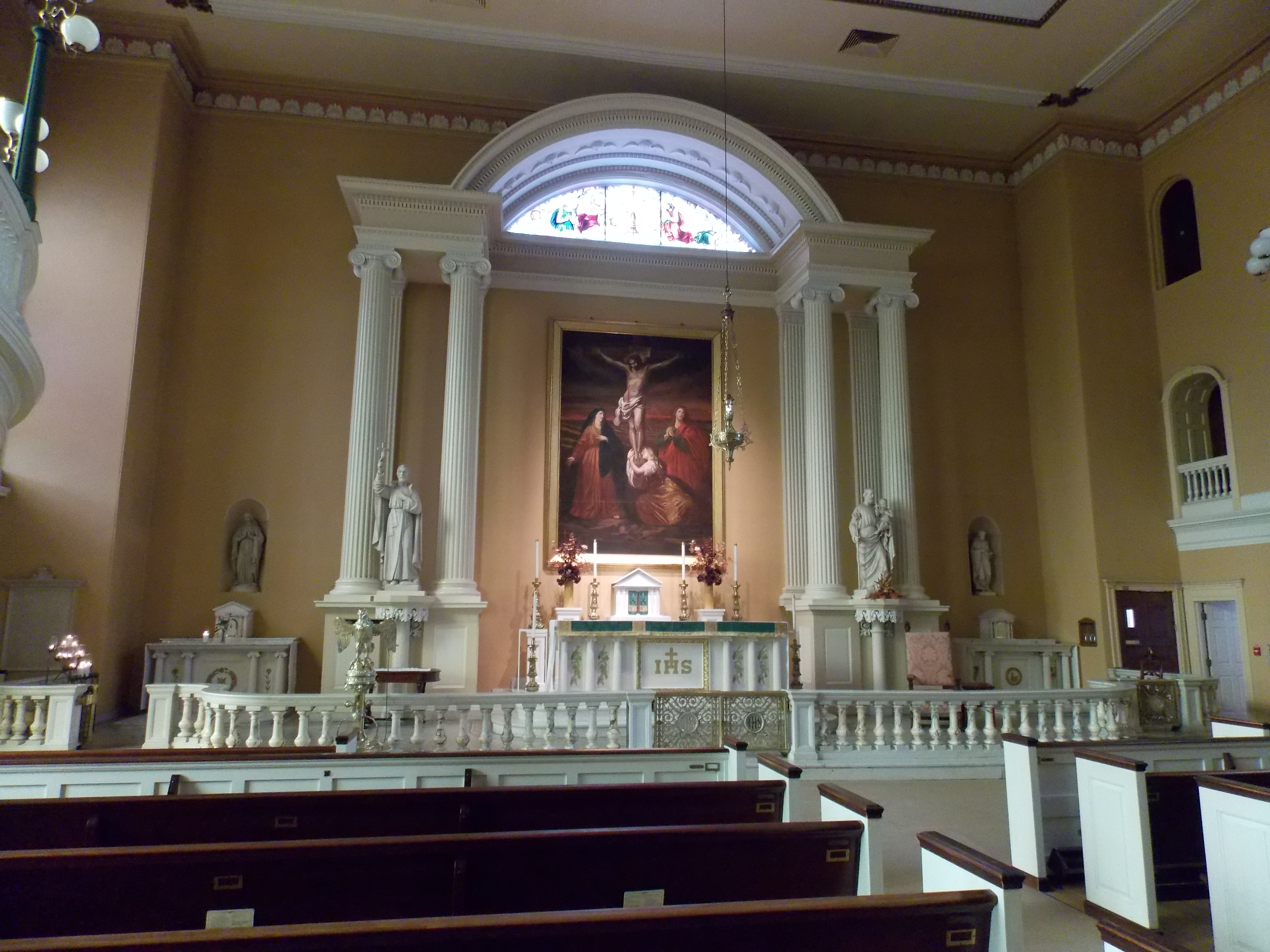
The church's interior

The church structure is nearly impossible to see from the street. One story relates that Benjamin Franklin advised Father Greaton to protect the church, since religious prejudice existed in the largely Quaker city at the time. The front wall of the church is a party wall to a neighboring structure and so provides no means of entry. The entrance from Willings Alley remains through a narrow arch with iron gates, which opens to an unassuming courtyard that conceals the nature of the church building. (On two occasions, in 1740 and 1755, Quakers helped defend St. Joseph's original chapel to prevent Protestant mobs from destroying it.) Today the only entrances to the sanctuary are on either side, toward the back of the church, because there are unrelated buildings before and behind the church building on Walnut and Fourth Streets.

The present church is the third on the site and was dedicated in 1839. Parishioner John Darragh was the builder-architect. In 1886, major renovations were undertaken by architect John J. Deery. Other renovations by architects Walter Francis Ballinger and Emil George Perrot took place in 1904.

Filippo Costaggini's "The Angelic Exaltation of St. Joseph into Heaven (1886), a circular painting 15 feet (5 m) in diameter, is affixed to the ceiling. It depicts St. Joseph surrounded by angels with an infant Jesus on his lap bearing lilies, the flower associated with the saint. Done in the Italian Neoclassical style that dominated Catholic churches in the late 19th century, it has been recognized as historically significant by the Philadelphia Historical Commission.

The large painting of the Crucifixion, above the altar, was executed about 1840 by parishioner Sylvano Martinez.

== Education ==
The designated parochial school for Old St. Joseph's Church is St. Mary Interparochial Grade School.

== Legacy ==
Eight Catholic dioceses trace their roots to Jesuit missionaries from Old St. Joseph's.

St. John Neumann founded the Beneficial Savings Fund Society at Old St. Joseph's in 1853.

St. Joseph's University and St. Joseph's Preparatory School were founded at Old St. Joseph's in 1841 and 1851, respectively.

== See also ==
- Anthony Rey, S.J. (Old St. Joseph's 1843–1845)
