= List of church buildings in Philadelphia =

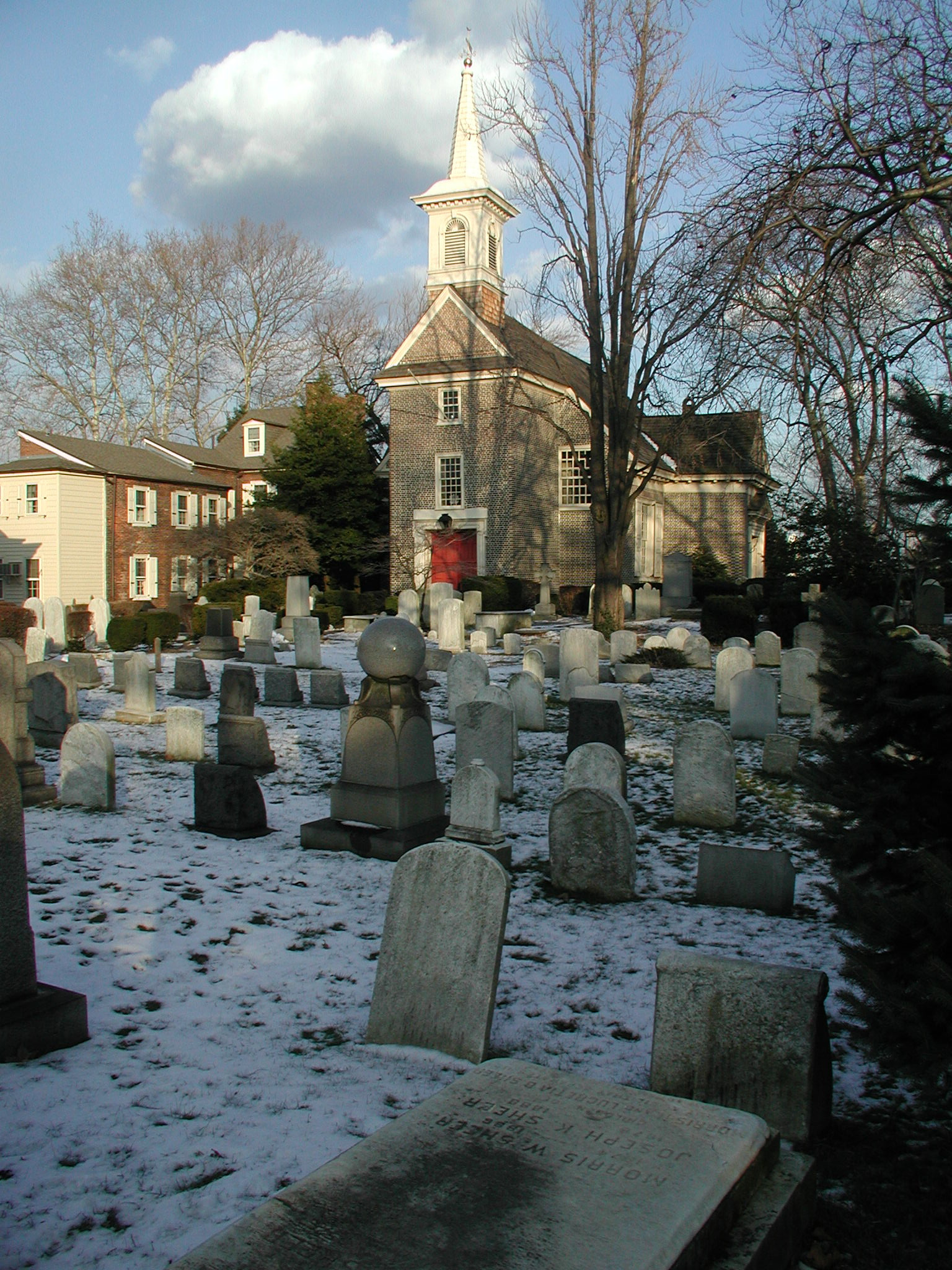
Gloria Dei Church.

The churches of Philadelphia are numerous and diverse. Founded by William Penn to celebrate religious freedom, Philadelphia has many historic and significant churches, among many smaller and newer ones.

== African Methodist Episcopal Church ==
Image	Church	Location	Notes
	Allen A.M.E. Church	5901 Larchwood Avenue	
	Alleyne Memorial A.M.E. Zion Church	1249 North 55th Street	
	Hickman Temple A.M.E. Church	5001 Baltimore Avenue	
	Mother Bethel A.M.E. Church	419 South 6th Street a.k.a. 419 Richard Allen Avenue	
	Waters Memorial A.M.E. Church	609 South Clifton Street	
Wesley AME Zion Philly	Wesley A.M.E. Zion Church	1500 Lombard Street	
	Wharton Street Memorial Methodist Episcopal Church	5339 Catharine Street	

== Armenian Apostolic Church ==
Image	Church	Location	Notes
	Saint Gregory the Illuminator Armenian Apostolic Church	8701 Ridge Avenue	

== Baptist ==
Image	Church	Location	Notes
	Chestnut Street Baptist Church and Ternacle Baptist Church	4017 Chestnut Street	
	Christian Stronghold Church	4701 Lancaster Avenue; 39.9717°N 75.2155°W	
	Church of the Redeemer Baptist	1440 South 24th Street; 39.9340°N 75.1846°W	
	First Immanuel Baptist Church	2438 Ridge Avenue	
	Forty Sixth Street Baptist Church	1261–1265 South 46th Street	
	Glory Baptist Church	4128 Aspen Street	
Gospel Temple Baptist Church - 1327 S 19th St Philadelphia PA	Gospel Temple Baptist Church	1327 South 19th Street; 39.9355°N 75.1753°W	
	Grace Baptist Church of Philadelphia	1837–55 North Broad Street; 40.1474°N 75.2569°W	HABS PA-6662
	Greater Exodus Baptist Church	704 North Broad Street; 39.9675°N 75.1606°W	
	Greater Fellowship Missionary Baptist Church	5522 Woodland Avenue	
Mount Hebron Baptist Church	Mount Hebron Baptist Church	1419 Wharton Street	
New Greenwich Light Baptist Church	New Greenwich Light Baptist Church	121 West Oregon Avenue	
	Pennepack Baptist Church	8732 Krewstown Road	
	People's Baptist Church	5039 Baltimore Avenue	
	Philadelphia City of Praise Baptist Church	1648 West Hunting Park Avenue	
	St. Andrews Fellowship Baptist Church	4910 Wayne Avenue	
	Smith Chapel Baptist Church	1828 Ridge Avenue	
	Tacony Baptist Church	4715 Disston Street	HABS PA-6692-C
	Transfiguration Baptist Church	3732 Fairmount Avenue	
	Union Tabernacle Baptist Church	4856 Lancaster Avenue	
	Vietnamese International Baptist Church of Philadelphia	590 Adams Avenue	Damaged or destroyed by a fire in 2020
	Wayland Memorial Baptist Church	5126 Baltimore Avenue	
	Wayland Temple Baptist Church	2500 Cecil B. Moore Avenue	
	White Rock Baptist Church	5240 Chestnut Street	

== Brethren in Christ Church ==
Image	Church	Location	Notes
	Mount Calvary Holy Church	5944 Catharine Street	
	Circle of Hope	2214 South Broad Street; 2007 Frankford Avenue; 2309 North Broad Street; 5720 Ridge Avenue; 3800 Marlton Pike, NJ	

== Episcopal ==
Image	Church	Location	Notes
	Church of the Advocate	1801 West Diamond Street	
	Christ Church	20 North American Street	
	Church of the Crucifixion	620 South 8th Street; 39.9418°N 75.1558°W	
	Gloria Dei (Old Swedes') Church	Columbus Boulevard and Christian Street	
	Church of the Holy Trinity	1904 Walnut Street	
	Philadelphia Episcopal Cathedral	3723 Chestnut Street	
	Saint Clement's Church	2013 Appletree Street	
	St. James Kingsessing (Old Swedes')	6838 Woodland Avenue	official website
	Church of St. James the Less	3227 West Clearfield Street	
	Church of St. Luke & the Epiphany	330 South 13th Street	
	Saint Mark's Episcopal Church	1625 Locust Street	
	Church of St. Martin in the Fields	8000 St. Martin’s Lane; 40.0654°N 75.2066°W	
	Saint Mary's Church	3916 Locust Walk	
	St. Paul's Episcopal Church	22 East Chestnut Hill Avenue	
	Saint Peter's Church	313 Pine Street	
	Saint Stephen's Church	19 South Tenth Street	
	African Episcopal Church of St. Thomas	6361 Lancaster Avenue; 39.9873°N 75.2512°W	First building: 5th Street, south of Walnut Street
	St. Timothy's Episcopal Church	5720 Ridge Avenue; 40.0276°N 75.2102°W	
	Trinity Church Oxford	6901 Rising Sun Avenue	Built c. 1700

== Friends (Quaker) ==
Image	Church	Location	Notes
	Arch Street Friends Meeting House	4th and Arch Streets	Interior
	Chestnut Hill Friends Meeting	20 East Mermaid Lane	
	Frankford Friends Meeting House	Unity and Waln Streets	
	Free Quaker Meetinghouse	500 Arch Street	
	Germantown Friends Meeting House	47 West Coulter Street	
	Race Street Friends Meetinghouse	1515 Cherry Street	
	West Philadelphia Friends Meeting House	3500 Lancaster Avenue	
Former buildings
	Girard Avenue Meeting House	17th Street and Girard Avenue	Built 1862; Discontinued 1934; Demolished
	Greater Friends Meeting House	SW corner 2nd and Market Streets	Built 1755. Dismantled 1812, used to build Twelfth Street Meeting House.
	Orange Street Friends Meeting House	7th Street and Washington Square South	Demolished 1911
	Twelfth Street Meeting House	20 South 12th Street	Built 1812-14, using materials from the Greater Meeting House. Dismantled and relocated to the George School, 1972-74.

== Lutheran ==
Image	Church	Location	Notes
	Evangelical Lutheran Church of the Atonement	1538–1542 East Montgomery Avenue	HABS PA-6789
	Redeemer Lutheran Church	3200 Ryan Avenue	
	St. Michael's Evangelical Lutheran Church (Mt. Airy)	6671 Germantown Avenue	Closed September 2016
	St. Michael's Lutheran Church - Kensington	2139 East Cumberland Street, Kensington	HABS PA-6793
	Tacony Evangelical Lutheran Church	6816 Jackson Street	HABS PA-6692-D
	University Lutheran Church of the Incarnation	3637 Chestnut Street	
	Lutheran Church of the Holy Communion	2110 Chestnut Street	

== Mennonite ==
Image	Church	Location	Notes
	Vietnamese Mennonite Church	6237 Woodland Avenue	
	West Philadelphia Mennonite Fellowship	4740 Baltimore Avenue	Building was constructed by and is shared with Calvary United Methodist
	Abundant Life Chinese Mennonite Church	1731 South Broad Street	
	Germantown Mennonite Church	21 West Washington Lane	Photo shows the historic Mennonite Meetinghouse, predecessor of the current church nearby
	Love Truth Chinese Mennonite Church	600 West Chew Avenue	
	Oxford Circle Mennonite Church	900 East Howell Street	

== Methodist ==
Image	Church	Location	Notes
	Arch Street United Methodist Church	55 North Broad Street	
	Calvary United Methodist Church	801 48th Street	
	Fox Chase United Methodist Church	Loney and Fillmore Streets	
	Saint George's United Methodist Church	324 New Street	
	United Methodist Church of the Redeemer	1128 Cottman Avenue	
	Kensington (Old Brick) United Methodist Church	300 Richmond Street (at Marlborough Street)	Founded June 1801; HABS PA-6788

== Non-Denominational ==
Image	Church	Location	Notes
	Metro Church	4200 Ridge Avenue	Formerly known as Metro Presbyterian Church. The building is listed in the Philadelphia Register of Historic Places, and was historically named "Odd Fellow’s Hall," "Prince Hall Masonic Temple," and "Palestine Hall."

== Orthodox Church ==
=== Albanian Orthodox ===
Image	Church	Location	Notes
	Saint John Chrysostom Albanian Orthodox Church	237 North 17th Street	

=== Greek Orthodox ===
Jurisdiction: Greek Orthodox Metropolis of New Jersey (New Jersey; the Greater Philadelphia area; Delaware; Maryland; Virginia)

Image	Church	Location	Notes
	Greek Orthodox Cathedral of Saint George	256 South 8th Street	
	Evangelismos of Theotokos	6501 Bustleton Avenue	

=== Orthodox Church in America (OCA) ===
Jurisdiction: Diocese of Eastern Pennsylvania

Image	Church	Location	Notes
	Assumption of the Holy Virgin Church	2101 South 28th Street	
	St. Stephen Cathedral	8598 Verree Road	
	Church of Our Lady	560 North 20th Street	
	St. Nicholas Church	817 North 7th Street	

=== Russian Orthodox ===
Jurisdiction: Russian Orthodox Church in the USA

Image	Church	Location	Notes
	Saint Andrew's Cathedral	5th Street and Fairmount Avenue	
	St. Michael the Archangel Church	335 Fairmount Avenue	

== Pentecostal ==
Image	Church	Location	Notes
	Bible School Mission Pentecostal Church	4512 Lancaster Avenue	
	Ebenezer Temple Pentecostal Church	5649 Christian Street	
	Mount Carmel Pentecostal Church	4716 Woodland Avenue	
	New Beginnings Pentecostal Church	502 East Haines Street	

== Presbyterian ==
Image	Church	Location	Notes
	Arch Street Presbyterian Church	1726–1732 Arch Street	
	Bethel Korean Presbyterian Church	6831 North Franklin Street	
	Bethel Presbyterian Church	1900 West York Street	
	Calvin Presbyterian Church	1401 North 60th Street	
	Cedar Park Presbyterian Church	7740 Limekiln Pike	
	Chestnut Hill Presbyterian Church	8855 Germantown Avenue	
	Christ's Presbyterian Church	1020 South 10th Street	
	Disston Memorial Presbyterian Church	4506 Tyson Avenue	HABS PA-6692-E
	Emmanuel Chapel	835 Reed Street	
	Emmanuel Church	4723 Spruce Street	
	Falls of Schuylkill Presbyterian Church	3800 West Vaux Street	
	First African Presbyterian Church	4159 West Girard Avenue	
	First Presbyterian Church	201 South 21st Street	
	First Presbyterian Church of Kensington	418 East Girard Avenue	Samuel Sloan, architect HABS PA-6790
	Liberti	Northeast: 2424 East York Street; Fairmount: 1901 West Girard Avenue	
	Lombard Central Presbyterian	4201 Powelton Avenue	
	Mount Airy Presbyterian Church	13 East Mt. Pleasant Avenue	
	Old Pine Street Presbyterian Church	412 Pine Street	
	Olivet Covenant Presbyterian Church	608 North 22nd Street	
	Overbrook Presbyterian Church	6376 City Avenue	
	Renewal Presbyterian Church	4633 Cedar Avenue	
	Summit Presbyterian Church	6757 Greene Street	
	Tabernacle United Church	3700 Chestnut Street	HABS PA-1099
	Tenth Presbyterian Church	1700 Spruce Street	Completed 1856, John McArthur Jr., architect Altered 1893, Frank Miles Day, architect Wooden spire removed 1912
	Third Reformed Presbyterian	3024 Byberry Road	
	Union Tabernacle Presbyterian	2036–2038 East Cumberland Street	HABS PA-6787
	Wissahickon Presbyterian Church	5245 Ridge Avenue	
	Woodland Presbyterian Church	401 South 42nd Street	
	Wylie Chambers Memorial Presbyterian (Broad Street Ministry)	315 South Broad Street	
Former buildings
	Green Hill Presbyterian Church	1617 West Girard Avenue	John Notman, architect Demolished 2009
	Boulevard United Presbyterian Church	200 East Wyoming Avenue	Existing structure for sale in 2014; Current denomination unknown

== Reformed ==
Image	Church	Location	Notes
	Resurrection Philadelphia (formerly First Baptist Church)	123 South 17th Street; 39.9505°N 75.1687°W	

== Reformed Episcopal Church ==
Image	Church	Location	Notes
	Reformed Episcopal Church of the Atonement	6100 Greene Street	
	St. Luke's–Bishop Hoffman Memorial Reformed Episcopal Church	6701 Frankford Avenue	
	Christ Memorial Reformed Episcopal Church	43rd and Chestnut Streets	Demolished 2018

== Roman Catholic ==
Image	Church	Location	Notes
	Cathedral Basilica of Saints Peter and Paul	18th Street and Benjamin Franklin Parkway	
	St. John the Evangelist Church	21 South 13th Street	
	Holy Redeemer Chinese Catholic Church and School	915 Vine Street	HABS PA-1513
	Church of the Gesú	1733 West Girard Avenue	
	Immaculate Conception Church	1020 North Front Street	
	Immaculate Conception Church (East Germantown)	1020 East Price Street	Closed June 2012
	Nativity BVM Roman Catholic Church	2535 East Allegheny Avenue	
	Our Mother of Sorrows Catholic Church and School	1008 North 48th Street	
	Old Saint Joseph's Church	321 Willings Alley	
	Our Mother of Consolation Church	9 East Chestnut Hill Avenue	
	Resurrection of Our Lord Church	2000 Shelmire Avenue	
	St. Adalbert in Philadelphia	2645 East Allegheny Avenue	Known as the "Polish Cathedral" of Philadelphia
	Saint Augustine Church	243 North Lawrence Street	
	Saint Charles Borromeo Roman Catholid Church	902 South 20th Street	
	Saint Cyprian Catholic Church	525 South Cobbs Creek Parkway	
	Saint Donato Church	403 North 65th Street	
	Saint Francis de Sales Roman Catholic Church	4625 Springfield Avenue	
	Saint Gabriel's	2917 Dickinson Street	
	St. Agatha – St. James Church	3728 Chestnut Street	
	Saint Joachim Church	1527 Church Street	Closed July 2013
	Saint Laurentius	1608 East Berks Street	Closed March 2014
	St. Leo the Great	6670 Keystone Street	Demolished; HABS PA-6692-B
St. Mary Magdalen de' Pazzi Church Philadelphia PA	St. Mary Magdalen de' Pazzi Church	712 Montrose Street	
Old St. Mary's Church Philadelphia lithograph	St. Mary's	248 South 4th Street	
St Michael's Catholic Church West Kensington Philadelphia PA	St. Michael's Church	1445 North 2nd Street	
St Monica Parish Church 2422 S 17th St Philadelphia PA	St. Monica Parish Church	2422 South 17th Street	
St. Nicholas of Tolentine Church Philadelphia PA	Saint Nicholas of Tolentine Church	1718 South 9th Street	
St. Paul Parish Church Philadelphia PA	Saint Paul Church	923 Christian Street	
	Saint Peter the Apostle	1019 North 5th Street (at Girard Avenue)	National Shrine of Saint John Neumann
National Shrine of St. Rita of Cascia from east	National Shrine of St. Rita of Cascia	1166 South Broad Street	National Shrine of St Rita of Cascia view from the Northwest
	Saint Thomas Syro-Malabar Catholic Church	608 Welsh Road	
	St. William Church	6200 Rising Sun Avenue	
Stella Maris Catholic Church, 2901 S. 10th St. Philadelphia PA	Stella Maris Catholic Church	2901 South 10th Street	
	Visitation of the Blessed Virgin Mary Catholic Church	300 East Lehigh Avenue	HABS PA-6792

== Ukrainian Catholic ==
Image	Church	Location	Notes
	Christ the King Ukrainian Catholic Church	1629 West Cayuga Street	
	Ukrainian Catholic Cathedral	830 North Franklin Street	

== Unitarian ==
Image	Church	Location	Notes
	First Unitarian Church of Philadelphia	2125 Chestnut Street	Frank Furness, architect

== See also ==
- Buildings and architecture of Philadelphia
- City of Conquerors Church, Philadelphia
- Congregation Mikveh Israel
- Partners for Sacred Places
