= St. Veronica Parish (North Philadelphia) =

Historic Roman Catholic Church and Parish

Coordinates: 40.0047°N 75.1392°W

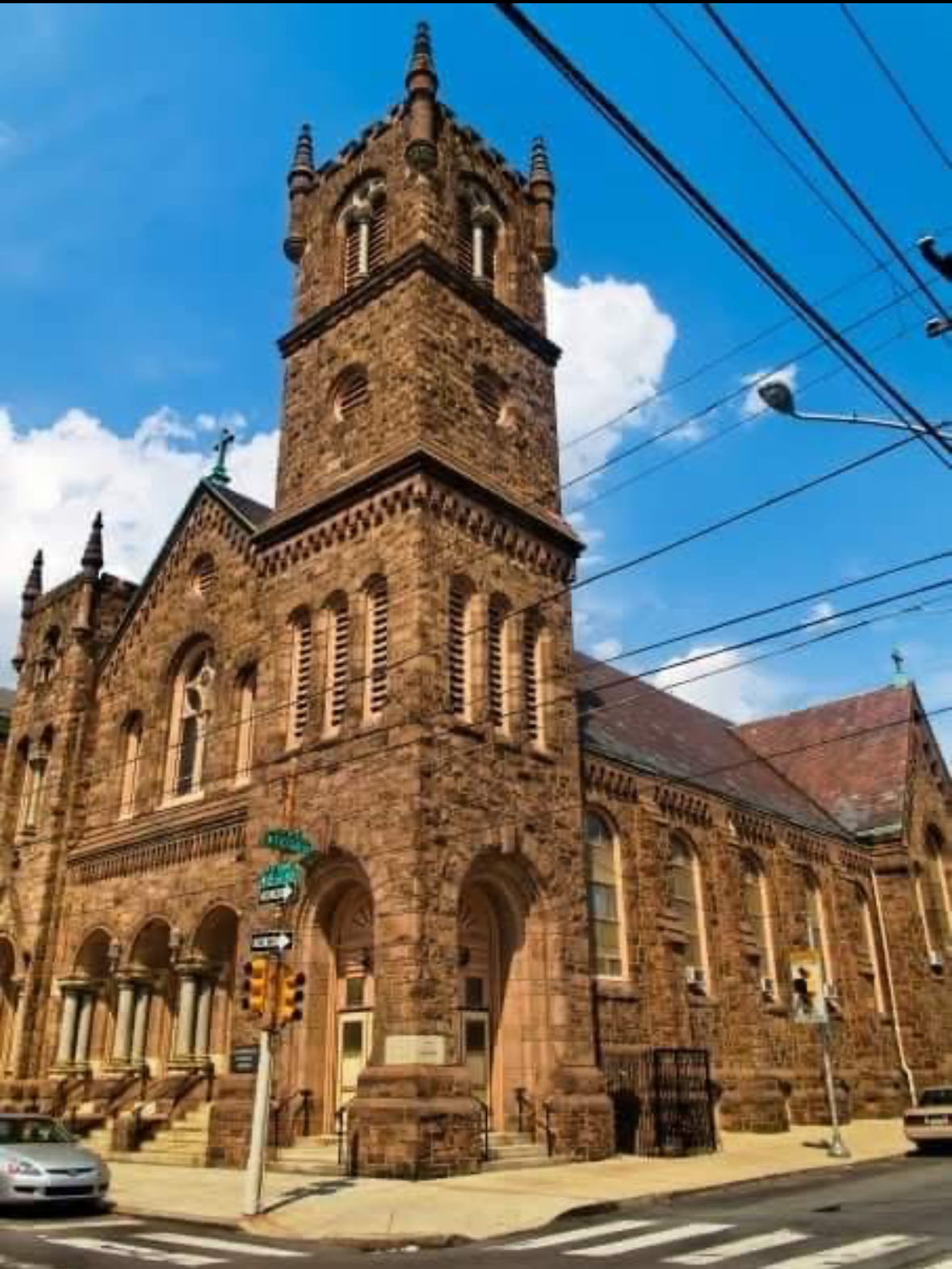
Saint Veronica Catholic Church, opened in 1909 in Franklinville, North Philadelphia

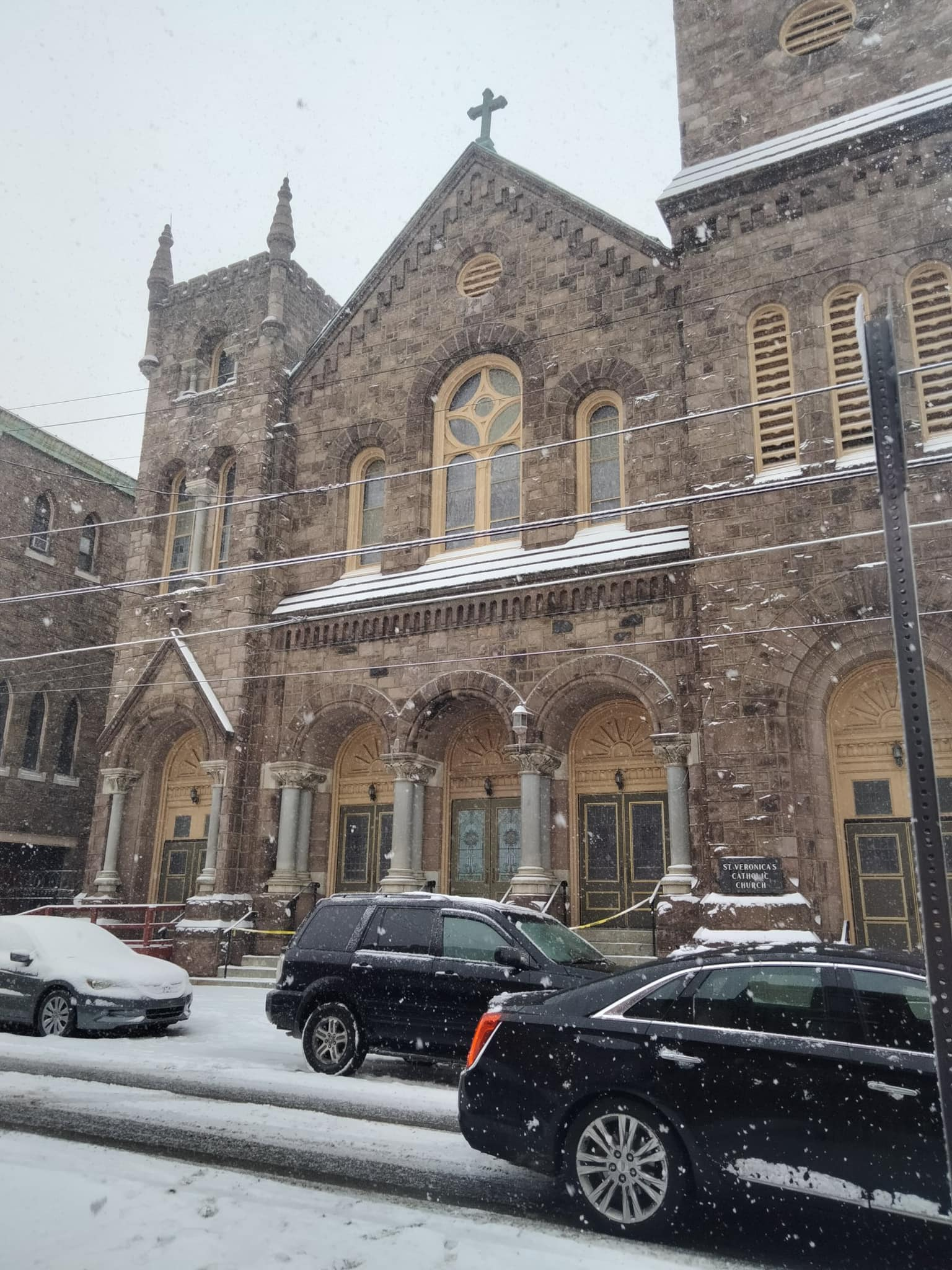
St. Veronica's, North Sixth and West Tioga, in winter

The Church of Saint Veronica (commonly known as St. Veronica Church or Saint Veronica's) is an active Catholic Church and Parish of the Roman Catholic Archdiocese of Philadelphia in the Franklinville neighborhood. The church, school and rectory are located on the northeast corner of Sixth and West Tioga Streets.

The Parish of Saint Veronica was organized in 1872 for the predominantly Irish emigrants living in North Philadelphia. A chapel and rectory were erected at the entrance of the New Cathedral Cemetery (Catholic). A new, larger chapel, school and rectory were completed in 1894. The Church of Saint Veronica opened in 1909. Today the congregation is largely Hispanic, Black and Filipino.

== History ==
Among the first religious services held in the first half of the 18th century in North Philadelphia were those in Nicetown, which served Catholics living in nearby Frankford and Germantown and what would become Franklinville. A "young Irish woman" named Elizabeth McGawley, who came with her tenants, built a chapel, in 1729, on the road between Nicetown and Frankford. Services were later held by priests from Old St. Joseph's and those traveling to and from Philadelphia at the home of John Michael Browne (1703-1750). Born in Tuam, Ireland, he resided in the West Indies before coming to what would become Franklinville, where he purchased acreage in 1742.

Browne was known as a "priest;" his "mansion" stood on land that is now part of the New Cathedral Cemetery and remained into the cemetery's early years. When Browne died, he was interred, according to his wishes, in his orchard, in what was known as "The Priest's Lot," at Second Street and Rising Sun Lane. His remains were removed by church authorities and reinterred in the St. Stephen's Church burial yard in Nicetown on February 21, 1848.

After Browne's death, services were held, until 1780, at the home of Paul Miller, a sexton at Old St. Joseph's, near today's North Eighth Street and West Hunting Park Avenue.

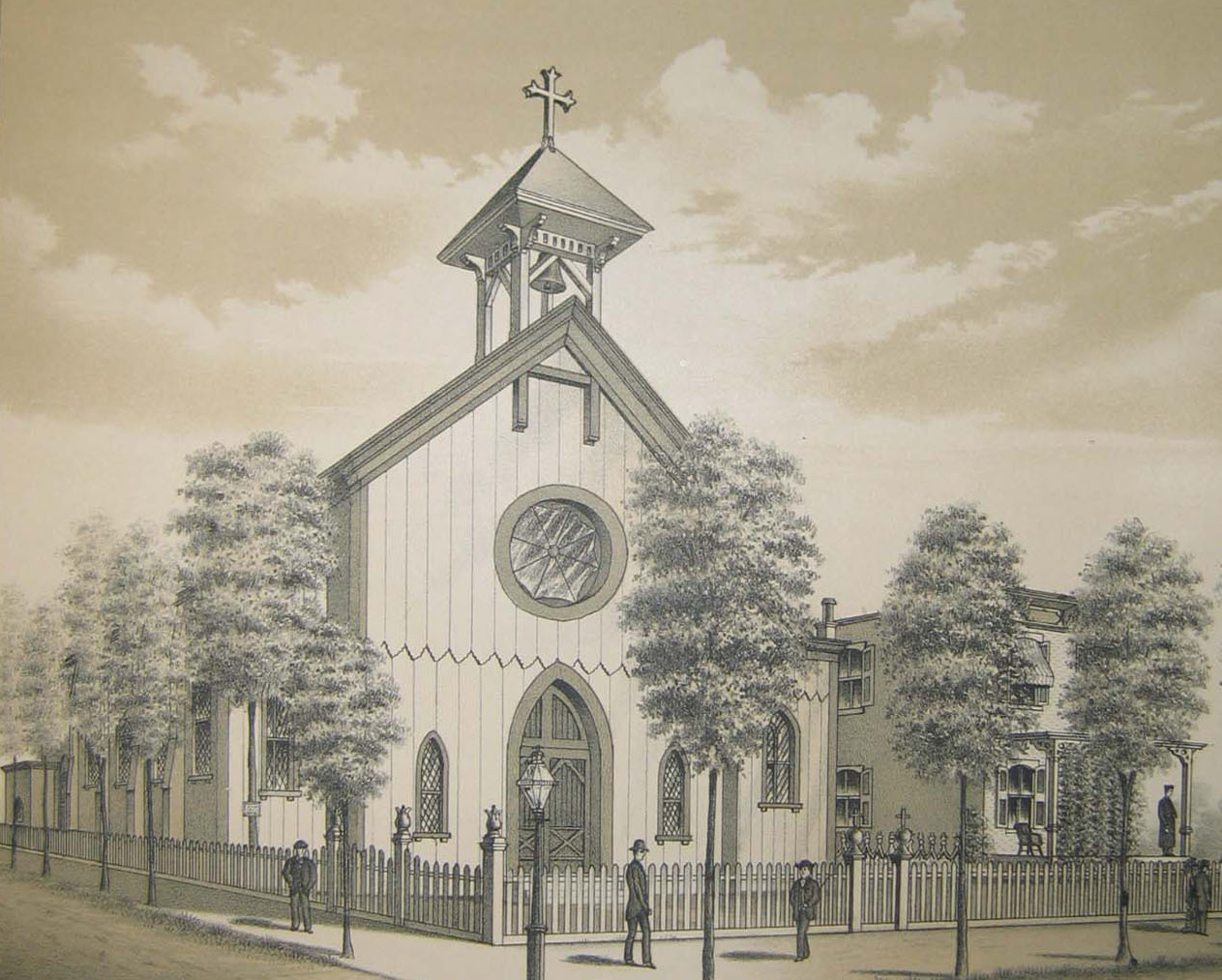
St. Veronica Parish, first chapel and rectory, at Second and Butler Streets Philadelphia. Lithograph, about 1880

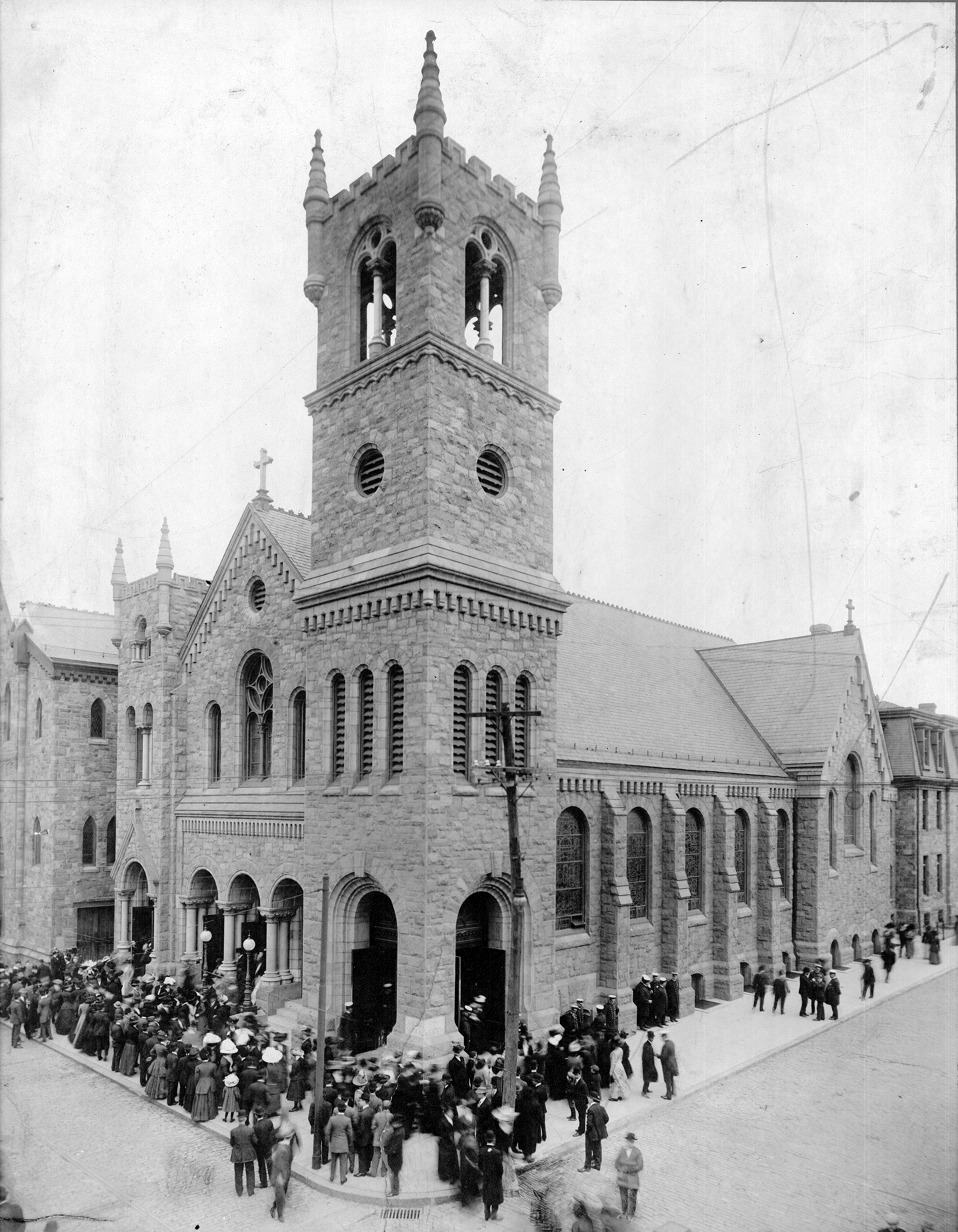
New Church of St. Veronica, 1909. Built by Father Donnelly. At 6th and Tioga Streets. Catholic Historical Research Center Digital Collections

The New Cathedral Cemetery, today with about 38 acres, opened in 1868 on land originally owned by Browne that he wanted to become a burial ground. Services were held in his home until the chapel was erected.

On June 2, 1872, the North Pennsylvania Railroad Company ran special trains for the cornerstone-laying ceremony of the new parish chapel at Second and Nicetown Lane (today near Butler Street). The trains brought two thousand people; six thousand people were reported to have attended the celebration. The first service in the wood-frame church in the St. Veronica Parish was held on September 22.

The church was erected by parishioners of St. Michael's (1831), Second and Master Streets in West Kensington, who held services at the new chapel. It was attended to by priests as a mission for Saint Stephen's Catholic Church (1843), North Broad and Butler Streets, in Nicetown, until 1879, when St. Veronica's was assigned its own priest, Father William A. McLoughlin. The church served as mortuary chapel for the new cemetery. The parish rectory was built next door.

Father John J. Donnelly (1851-1927) was appointed rector in 1889 and he found the location of the chapel "not sufficiently central for the parish." The congregation had grown from 75 parishioners to 4,000, and settlement had moved west of the original chapel. Rev. Donnelly purchased a lot on the northeast corner of Sixth and Tioga Streets and a new Norman-Romanesque chapel and school, of Trenton brownstone, was erected and dedicated on April 22, 1894. Three years later, a new rectory in the Second Empire style was completed.

The parish complex was designed by the esteemed ecclesiastical architect Edwin F. During. The carpenter/builder was the founder of what became one of the largest construction firms in the country and father of John McShain, known as "the man who built Washington" including the Pentagon.

The original parish chapel was dismantled and removed to the South Philadelphia neighborhood of Passyunk Square where it was reassembled for the Parish of Saint Monica, in 1895.

The cornerstone of the new Church of St. Veronica was blessed on November 3, 1907, and was dedicated by Irish-born Archbishop Patrick J. Ryan on October 17, 1909. Rev. McDevitt delivered the sermon and Rev. Donnelly, the requiem high mass.

Today it is a sister parish to Saints Simon and Jude Parish in West Chester, Pennsylvania.

== School ==
St. Veronica School opened in 1894. Today it is an Independence Mission School today, one of 14 Philadelphia schools that were deemed "failing" by the state. They enroll pre-kindergarten through eighth grade students and were established "to provide a transformative Catholic education that develops students intellectually, emotionally, and spiritually," for "children of all faiths."

Two convents servicing St. Veronica School and Church are Servants of the Lord and the Virgin of Matara and Sisters of St. Joseph Convent at St. Hugh of Cluny.

== Merged parishes ==
In 1993, two nearby North Philadelphia parishes merged with St. Veronica: Our Lady of Pompeii Parish (Italian), founded in 1914 in Franklinville at Erie Street and North 6th, and St. Bonaventure Parish (German), founded in 1889 in Fairhill, on North 9th and Cambria Street.

The Church of Our Lady of Pompeii is still standing. The Church of St. Bonaventure, which took 12 years to build with materials imported from Germany, opened in 1906. It was demolished in 2014.

== Sexual abuse ==
In 2013, Richard T. Powers, a 77-year-old retired priest at the time and a former rector at St. Veronica, was deemed, in the wake of the Philadelphia Archdiocese sex abuse scandal, to be "unsuitable for ministry" by the Church after it found "a substantiated allegation of sexual abuse...."
