= Murder of Mary Mohrman =

1868 murder in Philadelphia

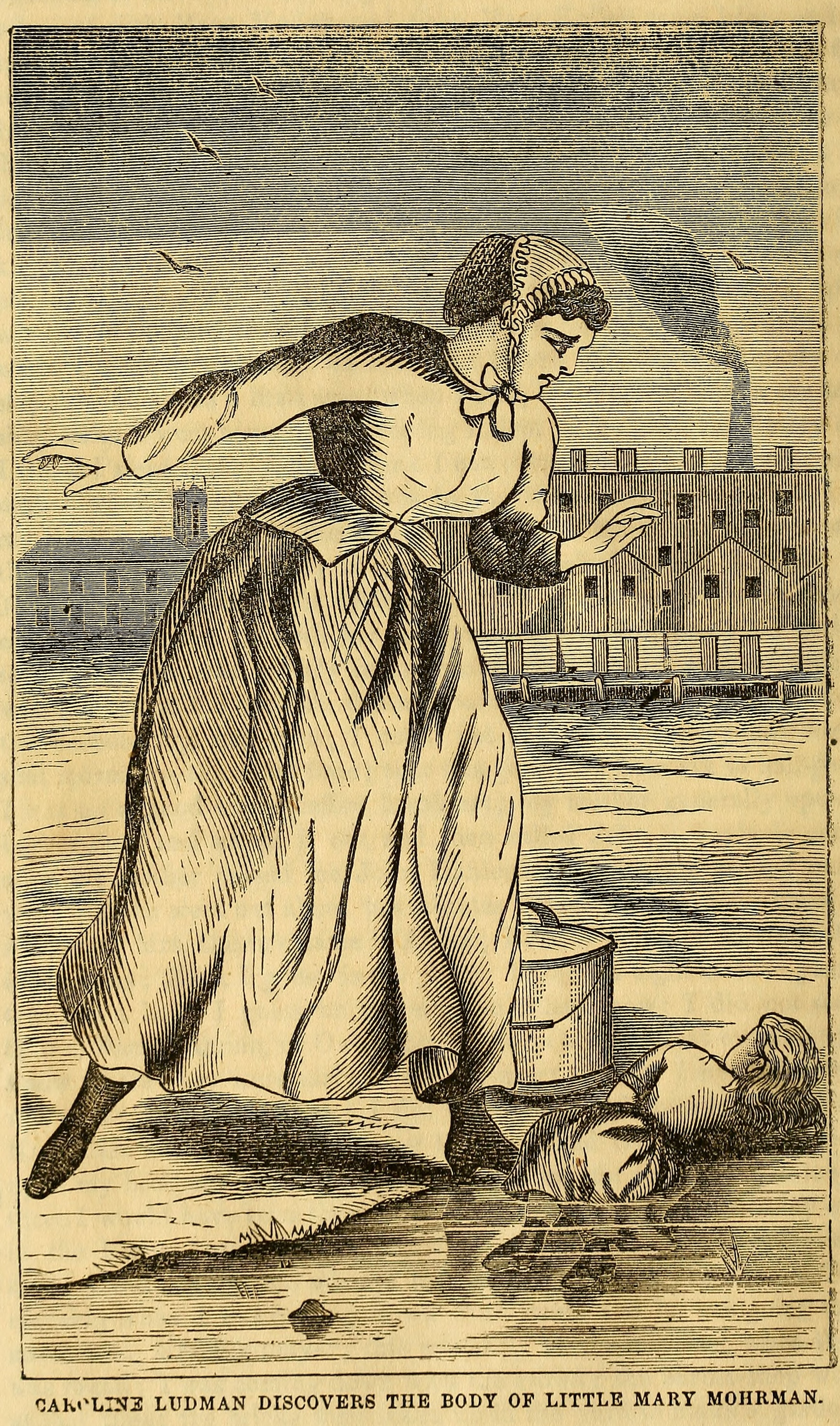
from the book: Life, trial, confession & conviction of John Hanlon...1870

Mary Mohrman (or Mohrmann, Mohrmon, Mormon) was a six-year-old girl who was raped and strangled to death in 19th-century North Philadelphia. Her body was found in an empty city lot, floating in a shallow pool of water, on the morning of September 8, 1868. John F. Hanlon Jr. was tried and eventually hanged for the crime.

== Background ==
Mary Mohrman was born into a German-American Catholic family in a working class district, her father, a cordwainer, died in 1866, leaving her mother with five children.

== Murder ==
Mary had been playing with friends outside her home on Orkney Street in West Kensington, also known as the Norris Square neighborhood, when she was abducted. On the evening of September 6, 1868, Mary's playmate, and other witnesses, reported seeing a "strange man" take Mary by the hand and lead her "into an alley". Mary's body was discovered September 8, in a sunken city lot at 6th St. and Susquehanna Avenue. Several men were arrested, but then later released; the crime went unsolved for more than a year.

A funeral was held September 10, 1868, at Saint Boniface Catholic Church, at Mascher and Diamond Streets on Norris Square. "The entire neighborhood was thronged with people and the church was densely crowded", according to newspaper reports.

At the time of her murder, John F. Hanlon Jr. was a 20-year-old, recently married barber living with his wife and mother at 2055 N. 5th, where he cut hair in his street-level barbershop of their residence, a three-story tenement house. Less than a block away was the residence of the Mohrman family, who lived in a two-story rowhouse at 2046 N. Orkney. Hanlon (also Hanlin) was born in 1848, the year his large Catholic family arrived from Ireland during the Great Hunger. He married 18-year-old Anna Kelley on March 22, 1868, at the Cohocksink Church at 5th and Germantown Avenue.

== Aftermath and trial ==
Mohrman became one of the first interments at the recently opened New Cathedral Cemetery; her body was later moved to Saint Anne Catholic Church Parish Cemetery. Known as "Little Mary Mohrman", her murder and the subsequent trial and execution of her killer was an international sensation.

The following year, after the Mohrman death, Hanlon used the alias Charles Harris when he was arrested for attempting to molest a 10-year-old girl. Hanlon was convicted and sentenced to five years in prison, where police recognized him. They convinced his cellmate to coax a confession from Hanlon for killing Mohrman. After Hanlon reportedly confessed, he was tried, convicted and sentenced to death in late 1870 for the murder.

He was hanged on February 1, 1871, at Moyamensing Prison. Hanlon never confessed to his accusers for the crime. He was interred at Cathedral Cemetery, his body later moved to Saint Michael Catholic Church Parish Cemetery.
