= New Cathedral Cemetery (Philadelphia) =

Historic cemetery in Philadelphia, Pennsylvania

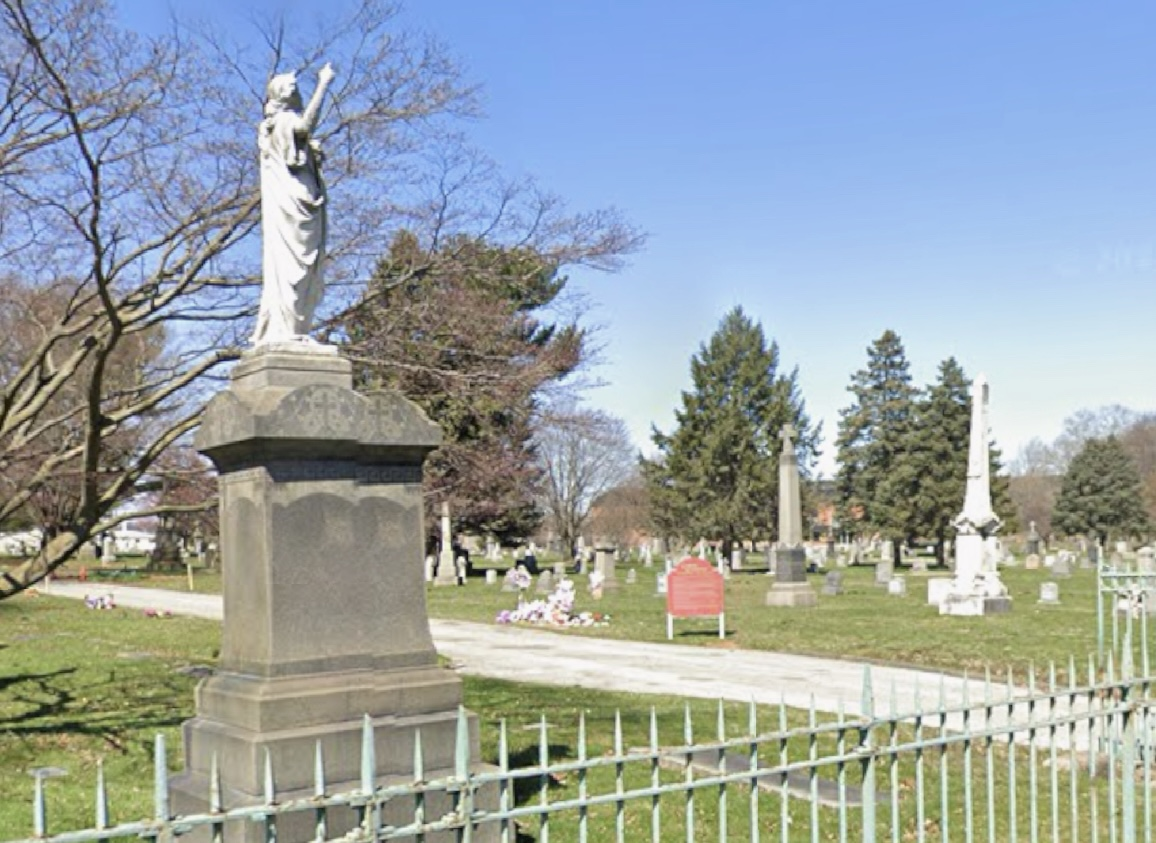
- Photo of New Cathedral Cemetery in 2025
- Interactive map of New Cathedral Cemetery

Details
- Established: 1868
- Location: Front Street & Luzerne Street, Philadelphia, Pennsylvania, U.S.
- Country: United States
- Coordinates: 40°00′35″N 75°07′37″W
- Size: 38 acres (15 ha)
- Website: Official website

New Cathedral Cemetery is a historic Catholic cemetery established by the Archdiocese of Philadelphia in 1868 in the Franklinville neighborhood of Philadelphia, Pennsylvania, United States. It was the second of 12 diocesan cemeteries established in the Philadelphia area.

== Description ==
The cemetery is located at Front and Luzerne Street in Philadelphia, Pennsylvania. It is approximately 38 acres in size and is managed by StoneMor Partners.

== History ==
On April 1, 1867, Archbishop James F. Wood purchased a little more than 41 acres in North Philadelphia for a second diocesan cemetery after Cathedral Cemetery, which opened in 1849. The new cemetery was to be about 8 miles to the northeast, in the Franklinville neighborhood of Philadelphia and named New Cathedral. It opened on Sunday, August 30, 1868. One of the first burials in the cemetery was the body of Mary Mohrman, a six-year-old murder victim.

The funds raised by the sale of burial lots were used for the construction of the Cathedral Basilica of Saints Peter and Paul. The diocese eventually opened 12 cemeteries in the Philadelphia area.

Church services were originally held in the mansion of the former owner of the property until the construction, in 1872, of St. Veronica Chapel and rectory, at the entrance to the cemetery at North Second Street and Nicetown Lane, which is West Butler Street today. When not used for church services, the little wooden chapel served as a mortuary space to the cemetery. However, the parish outgrew the small chapel and a new church was built in 1892 on the northeast corner of 6th and Tioga Streets.

Memorials for five American Civil War veterans buried in the cemetery were held in 2011 and 2019.

== Notable burials ==
- Joseph R. Chandler (1792-1880), U.S. Congressman
- William Densmore (c. 1833-1865), Medal of honor recipient
- Jim Devlin (1849-1883), Major League Baseball player
- Otto Knabe (1884-1961), Major League Baseball player
- Fergy Malone (1844-1905), Major League Baseball player
- Doc Powers (1870-1909), Major League Baseball player
- Johnny Ryan (1853-1902), Major League Baseball player
