= Franklinville, Philadelphia =

Franklinville
- Neighborhood of Philadelphia
- Location within Philadelphia
- Country: United States
- State: Pennsylvania
- County: Philadelphia
- City: Philadelphia
- Area codes: 215, 267, and 445

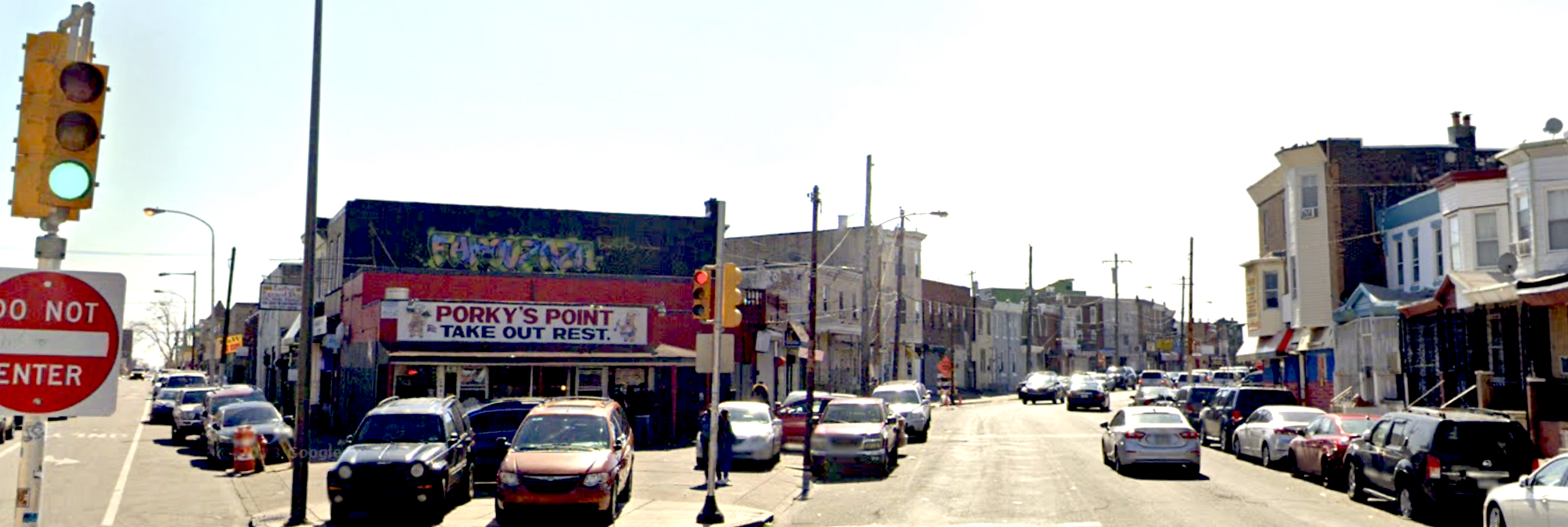
Franklinville, Philadelphia. Looking south on 5th St to the left with Rising Sun Avenue on right

Franklinville is a neighborhood of North Philadelphia, Pennsylvania, United States. According to the City Planning Commission, the boundaries of Franklinville are roughly a triangle bounded by West Sedgley Avenue, North Broad Street, and West Hunting Park Avenue.

Franklinville or "Franklin" appears on maps though not many residents in the area use the name to describe where they live. It is defined by Hunting Park and Feltonville to the north, Nicetown-Tioga-Rising Sun and Glenwood to the west, Upper Kensington and Feltonville to the east and Fairhill to the south (south of W. Sedgley).

== Demographics ==
The neighborhood was originally predominantly German and Irish, with many first and second generation emigrants from Southern and Eastern Europe, among other regions. Today there is a large Black population, 51 percent, and Hispanic population, 42 percent – many hailing from Puerto Rico – and Filipino families as well. The population was 22,230 in 2022. Its primary zip code is 19140.

The community remains robustly active through a social media page, "Tioga-Nicetown-Franklinville (Philly neighborhood Philadelphia)" as of January 2025.

== History ==
Named for the Philadelphian Benjamin Franklin, the original 72-acre tract was farmland in the Northern Liberties Township that was subdivided, beginning in 1852; Potter & Carmichael, oilcloth manufacturers, erected a sign with the name "Franklin-ville" on their factory before this year, in perhaps 1848.

The farmland was divided into 1,000 lots for townhouses, sold with a minimum 20 foot frontage, for $400 or $500 each, about $21,000 today. The land was owned by Coleman Fisher, whose large house in the middle of Venango Street was moved in the early 20th century.

The Franklin Land Company, John Turner, president, met at Franklin Hall and was one of the first mutual land firms in the city. Turner wanted to "aid those of small means."

His mansion, dating to 1750, was taken down to make room for the "industrial classes."

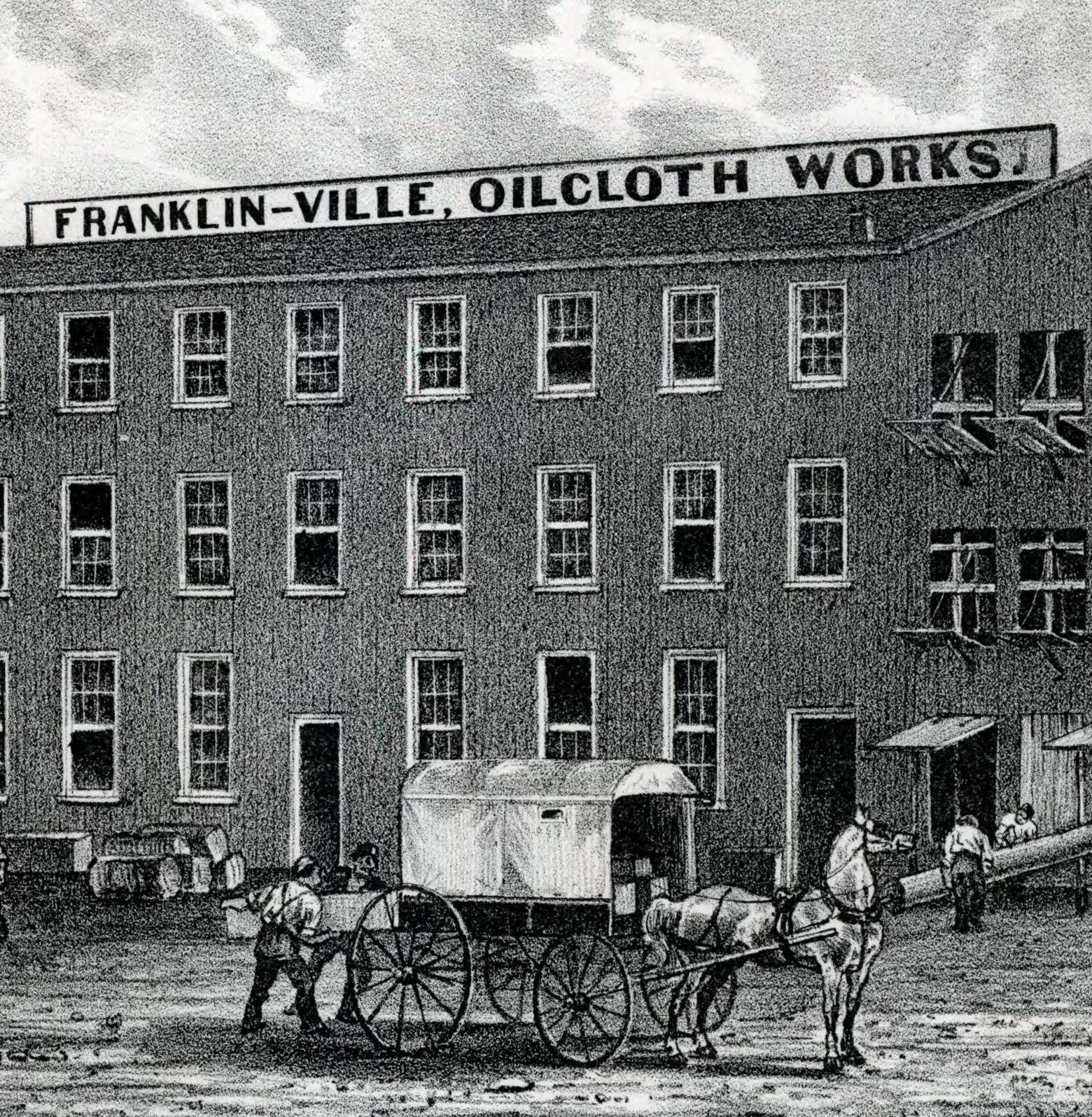
Franklin-Ville, Philadelphia. Potter & Carmichael, Oil Cloth Manufacturers. Warehouse, Number 135, North Third Street, Philadelphia, 1849. Library of Congress

Lots were taken rapidly with the price to stockholders set at $37.50 per lot; $40 if fenced with posts and rails. The center of the village was considered to be at the intersection of Nicetown Lane with Rising Sun Lane (called Avenue today).

Rising Sun, or Sunville, was an area to the immediate southeast of Franklinville where the colonial-era Rising Sun Tavern (built in 1746) at Germantown Road and Old York Road was run by A. Nice. The Pennsylvania Abolition Society was founded at the tavern in 1775. Dinah Nevill was "a black woman whose insistence that she was free-born helped fuel" the abolitionist movement. "It is said that the Lenapes used to watch the sun there," according to a history. "Rising Sun lane (Woodpecker lane) extended northeast from this fork to Stock Yards station at 2d and Bristol streets, from which point Old 2d street pike led northeast to Fox Chase and Huntingdon Valley, and New 2d street north to Olney, McCartersville and Jenkintown."

Franklinville was called "Franklin" on maps in 1860 and 1868, with Nicetown to the northeast, Feltonville to the north, Rising Sun to the southwest, Coopersville to the east-southeast. One of the first appearances of "Franklinville" in cartography was in 1862, which was located in the 25th ward of the city. In 1888, it was narrowly delineated as the "vicinity of Erie Avenue to Westmoreland Street, between Broad Street and Sedgley Avenue."

=== Railroad and industry ===
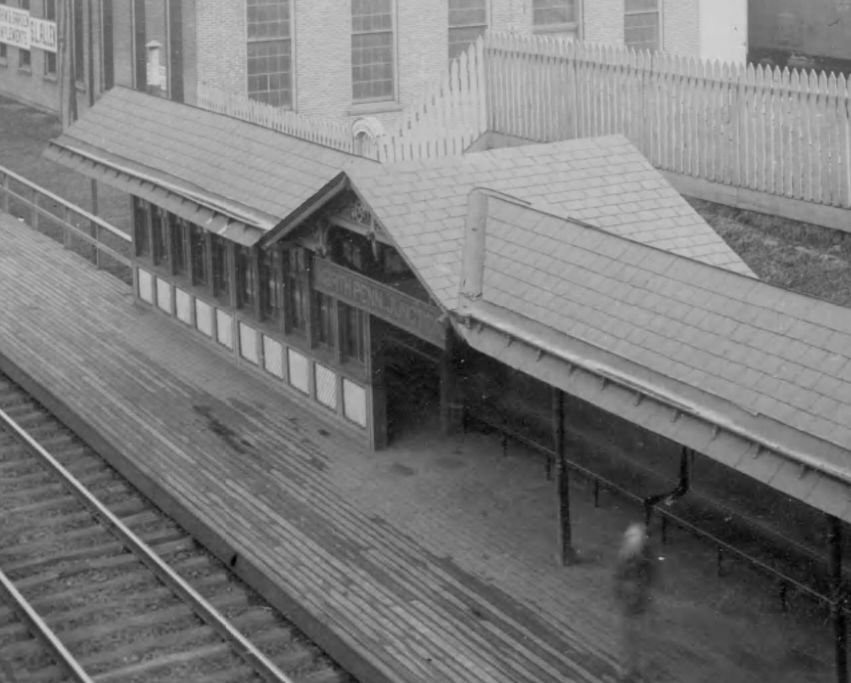
North Pennsylvania Railroad Junction Station, Waiting Shed, 5th & Tioga Avenue, Franklinvile, Philadelphia

The North Pennsylvania Railroad was the first to lay track through the area in 1854 to Jenkintown, opening the line the following year. The North Pennsylvania Junction station was erected on the east side of 5th Street at Tioga Street, which serviced Franklinville. A new station was erected in 1889. To the east was the North Penn freight station, on the north side of the tracks, west of 2nd Street. The Philadelphia and Reading Railway Company line from the south joined the North Pennsylvania Railroad here and a waiting shed allowed trains heading north and south to back up and take up passengers, next to the S. L. Allen & Company factory. The Pennsylvania Railroad Company tracks also joined here from points east.

Heading north from the Junction station on the North Pennsylvania Railroad line, there was the Erie Avenue Station (passenger) on the south side of Erie Avenue on the east side of the tracks. There was a freight station on West Erie Avenue at North Lawrence Street, near a rail and coal yard to the immediate north. The Drove Yard Station served the North Philadelphia Butchers & Drovers Association Stock Yard. Next was Greenmount, near the intersection of West Bristol Street and Rising Sun Avenue, which served Greenmount Cemetery to the east and the North Philadelphia Stock Yard to the southwest. Next was Lindley, on the south side of Lindley Avenue at North 7th which serviced the northwestern edge of Feltonville.

Industries including livestock yards, oil cloth works, nail manufacturers, dye works and ice companies began operating in the mid-19th century. In about 1848, Thomas Potter and James Carmichael established the Franklinville Oilcloth Works. In the 1895 city directory, the Franklinville Carriage and Wagon Works, the Franklinville Steam Coffee Roasting Establishment, the Franklinville Dye Works, the Franklinville Ice Manufacturing Company and the Franklinville Maennerchor Hall, a German social club, are listed.

Between about 1891 and 1900, The Franklinville Times was published on Saturdays, at four pages on an 18 x 24 sheet. It was also published out of Ashbourne, Fox Chase, Jenkintown, Oak Lane, Olgontz and Olney. E. H. Rosenberger was the editor and publisher with its offices at 642 Tioga St. Irish emigrant Michael Carolan moved to Franklinville with Irish-born wife Annie May Larner and their children (most born near Willow Grove and Fitzwatertown in Montgomery County) in about 1890 where he set up a blacksmith and horseshoeing shop at 530 Rising Sun Avenue. He arrived in New York City in 1847 aboard the Patrick Henry, which brought refugees of the Great Hunger from Ireland via the Clarence Dock in Liverpool.

In 1908, the following business establishments appear in the city directory: Franklinville Carriage and Wagon Works, 3806 N. 5th (until 1920); Franklinville Dye Works Company, 3961 N. 5th; Franklinville Ice & Storage Company, 3423 N. 6th; Franklinville Livery & Boarding Stables, 3615 N. Randolph.

=== Education and religion ===
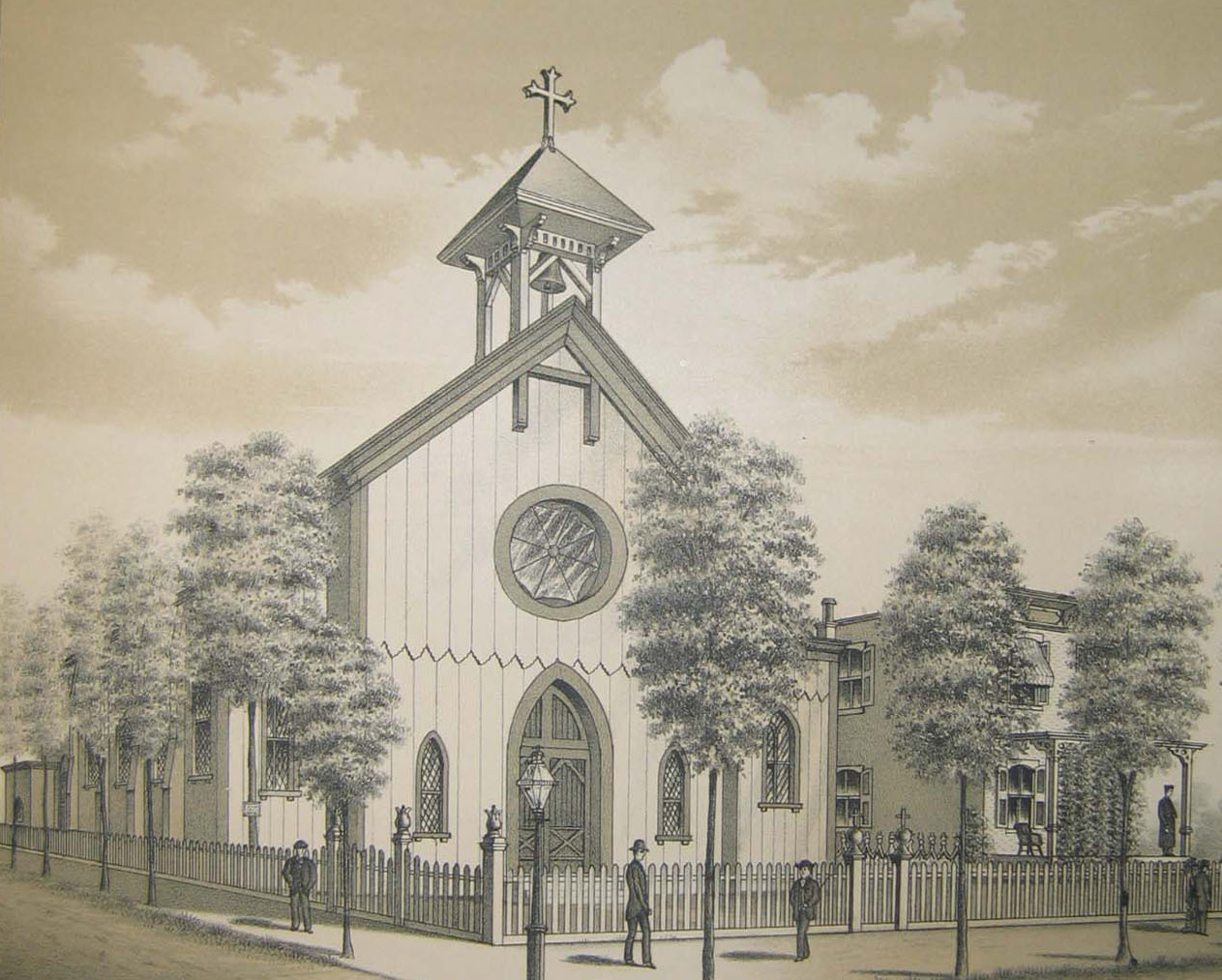
St. Veronica (Catholic) wood frame chapel and rectory at the entrance to the newly established New Cathedral Cemetery, Second & Butler Streets, erected 1872

The Franklinville Consolidated School was organized in 1856 at the Franklin Baptist Church on Rising Sun Lane and the North Pennsylvania Railroad. The first principal was Henrietta Woodruff. In 1869, it moved above Venango Street and was called the Enterprise Consolidated School; it became Bayard Taylor Consolidated in 1872, and reorganized into a combined secondary and primary in 1891.

There emerged many churches in the area over the years. Among the first religious services were held in the 18th century at neighboring Nicetown, which served Catholics living in nearby Frankford, Germantown, Nicetown and what would become Franklinville. Services were held by priests from Old St. Joseph's and those traveling to and from Philadelphia at the home of John Michael Browne (1703-1750), of Tuam, Ireland, who came from the West Indies in 1742 and purchased acreage in what would become Franklinville.

After Browne's death, services were held, until 1780, at the home of Paul Miller, a sexton at Old St. Joseph's, near today's Eighth St. and W. Hunting Park Ave.

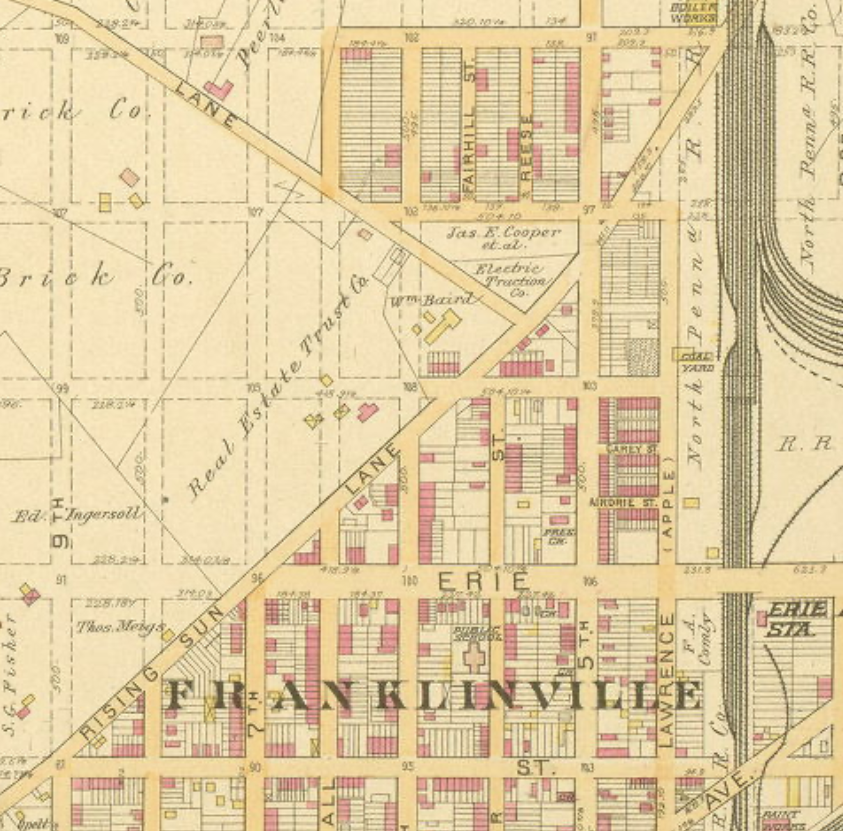
Franklinville, Philadelphia, from G.W. Baist, Property Atlas, 1895. Greater Philadelphia GeoHistory Network

The New Cathedral Cemetery, today with about 38 acres, opened in 1868 on land originally owned by Browne that he wanted to become a burial ground. The first service of St. Veronica Parish was held in a frame chapel in the Cemetery on September 22, 1872. A Norman-Romanesque chapel and school was erected on the northeast corner of Sixth and Tioga Streets between 1892 and 1894. A new parish church opened next door in 1909.

A small stone Protestant Episcopal church, the Church of the Resurrection, was erected in 1853 on North Broad and Tioga streets, in the center of what was then known as Rising Sun Village but later was absorbed into Franklinville.

The Methodist Episcopal Church at 5th and Erie Street, was founded in 1857.

The Christ Church (Episcopal) cornerstone was laid at the northwest corner of Sixth and Venango on April 17, 1876.

Bethel Lutheran Church opened at 5th and Sedgley in 1910. An Italian parish formed and erected a church, Our Lady of Pompeii, on the southern edge of Franklinville in 1914.
