= Tioga =

Tioga may refer to:

== United States communities ==
- Tioga, California, former name of Bennettville, California
- Tioga, Colorado
- Tioga, Florida
- Tioga, Iowa
- Tioga, Louisiana
- Tioga, Michigan
- Tioga, New York, a town in Tioga County
- Tioga County, New York, a county at the Pennsylvania border
- Tioga, North Dakota, a city in Williams County
- Tioga, Pennsylvania, a borough in Tioga County
- Tioga County, Pennsylvania
- Tioga, a neighborhood of Nicetown–Tioga in Philadelphia, Pennsylvania
- Tioga, Texas, a town in Grayson County
- Tioga, West Virginia
- Tioga, Wisconsin, an unincorporated community

== United States geography ==
- Tioga Lake, a lake in Inyo National Forest in the Sierra Nevada mountains of California
- Tioga Pass, a mountain pass in the Sierra Nevada
- Tioga River (Michigan)
- Tioga River (New Hampshire)
- Tioga River (Chemung River), a river flowing through New York and Pennsylvania

== Other uses ==
- Tioga Hotel, a historic building in Merced, California, US
- RV Tioga, an American coastal research vessel
