= Frankford Friends Meeting House =

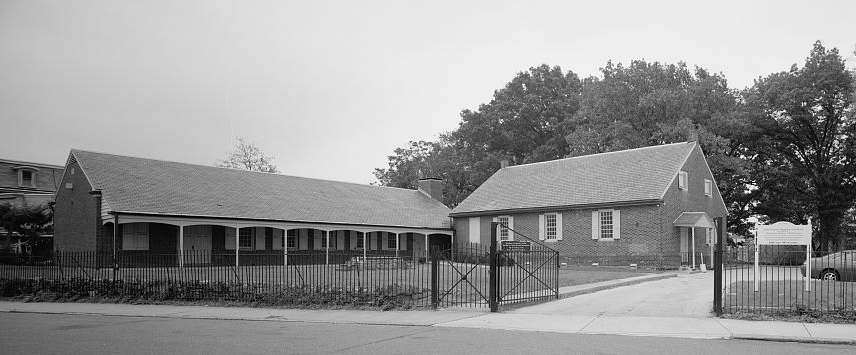
- Frankford Friends Meeting House from the Historic American Buildings Survey
- 40.0111°N 75.0842°W
- Location: Unity and Waln Streets; Philadelphia, Pennsylvania

Frankford (Preparative) Friends Meeting House is a historic Quaker meeting house in the Frankford neighborhood of Philadelphia, Pennsylvania. Its oldest parts having been built in 1775–1776, it is significant as the oldest surviving meeting house in Philadelphia.

Located at the corner of Unity and Waln Streets, it is now used also as a community center.

== The Friends meeting ==
The Quaker meeting here was known from its establishment by the Philadelphia Quarterly Meeting in 1683 as "Tacony" (after a nearby creek), then as "Oxford" (after the township in which it lay), then as "Frankford", then as "Unity" (to distinguish it from another Frankford meeting nearby on Orthodox Street). It is affiliated with the Philadelphia Yearly Meeting.

== The historic building ==
The original portion of the Frankford Preparative Friends Meeting House was built in 1775–76, making it the oldest Friends meeting house in Philadelphia. Although meeting houses were constructed in the region as early as the city's founding in the 1680s, most were replaced by the nineteenth century. Frankford Meeting House was originally erected as a single-cell, three-by-two-bay structure. In 1811–12, a smaller two-bay-wide section was added to accommodate the growing meeting. The addition also adapted the structure to a programmatic change that occurred among the Quakers during the late eighteenth century. Evidence indicates that a partition located to the east of the central doorway once divided the original single cell into two apartments. The smaller size of the eastern women's apartment reflected the English program whereby Friends met in a single room for worship, and then in separate apartments for gender-specific business meetings. By the late eighteenth century, American Friends began meeting on separate sides of a partition for worship and business, with the partition lowered for the latter. The new arrangement required two same-sized apartments and led to the development of the two-cell structure that became a standard for Friends meeting house design for nearly a century. Frankford's 1811–12 addition made the meeting house conform to the newer program by creating same-sized rooms, reflecting a critical point in the evolution of meeting house design. It is one of the few surviving examples of a single-cell form altered to accommodate separate space for women's meetings.

Frankford Meeting House is also of interest for its unusual mix of building materials. A refined treatment of Flemish-bond brick with glazed headers was used in constructing the facades facing the street. The use of locally quarried rubble stone gives a more vernacular appearance to the two remaining facades, including the south front. The utilization of both brick and stone was probably a function of economy. Materials from the previous meeting house were reused, minimizing the need for additional (more costly) brick, a practice indicative of Quaker thrift.

== See also ==
- List of church buildings in Philadelphia
