= Nicetown–Tioga, Philadelphia =

Neighborhood of Philadelphia, Pennsylvania, US

Nicetown–Tioga
- Neighborhood of Philadelphia
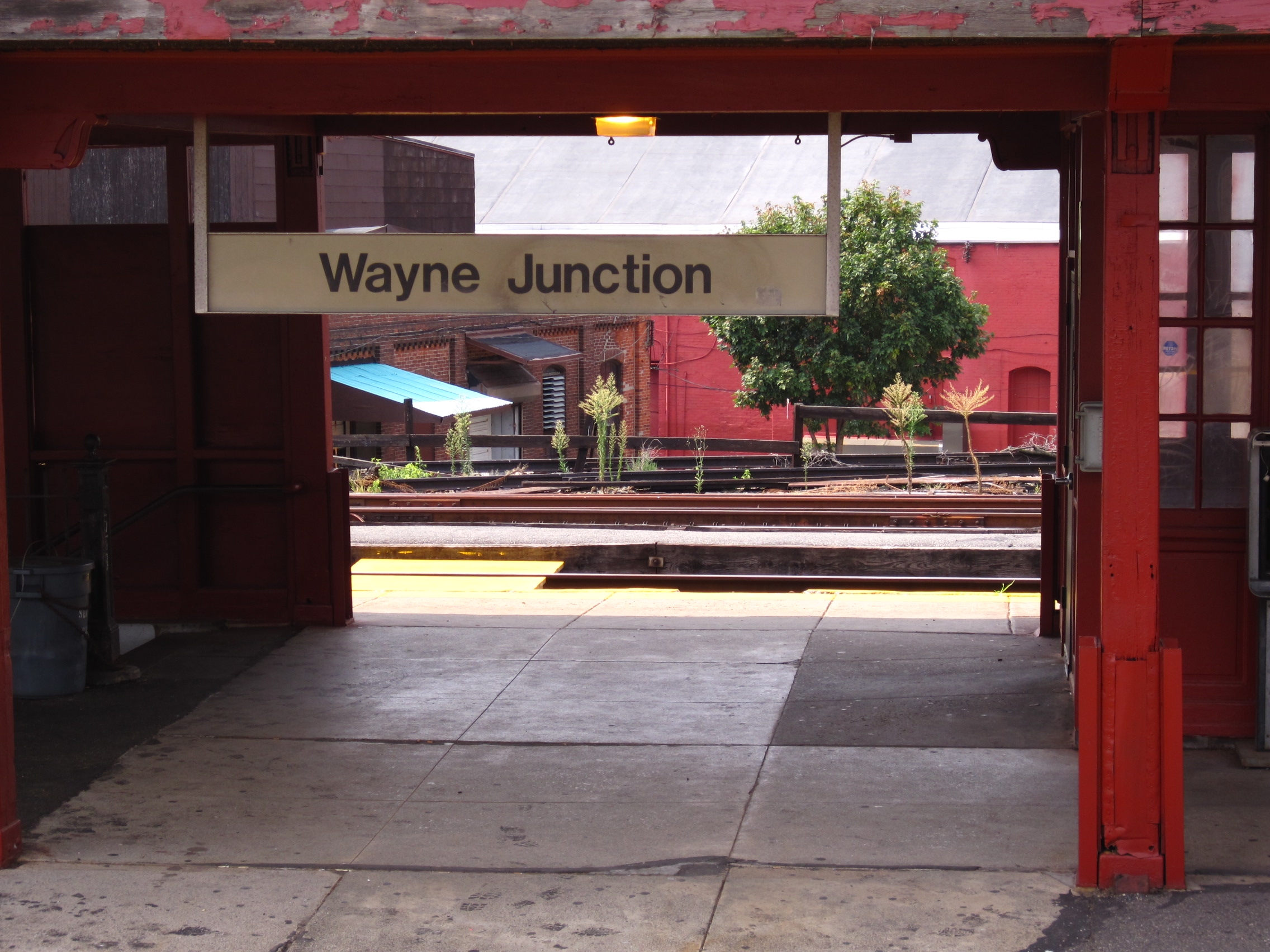
- The Wayne Junction train station is located in Germantown, Pa 19144.

- Location within Philadelphia
- Coordinates: 40°00′47″N 75°09′22″W
- Country: United States
- City: Philadelphia
- Area codes: 215, 267 and 445

Nicetown–Tioga is a neighborhood in the North Philadelphia section of the city of Philadelphia, Pennsylvania, U.S. It comprises two smaller, older neighborhoods, Nicetown and Tioga, although the distinction between the two is rarely emphasized today. The name "Nicetown" is often simply used to refer to any part of Nicetown–Tioga.

== Geography ==
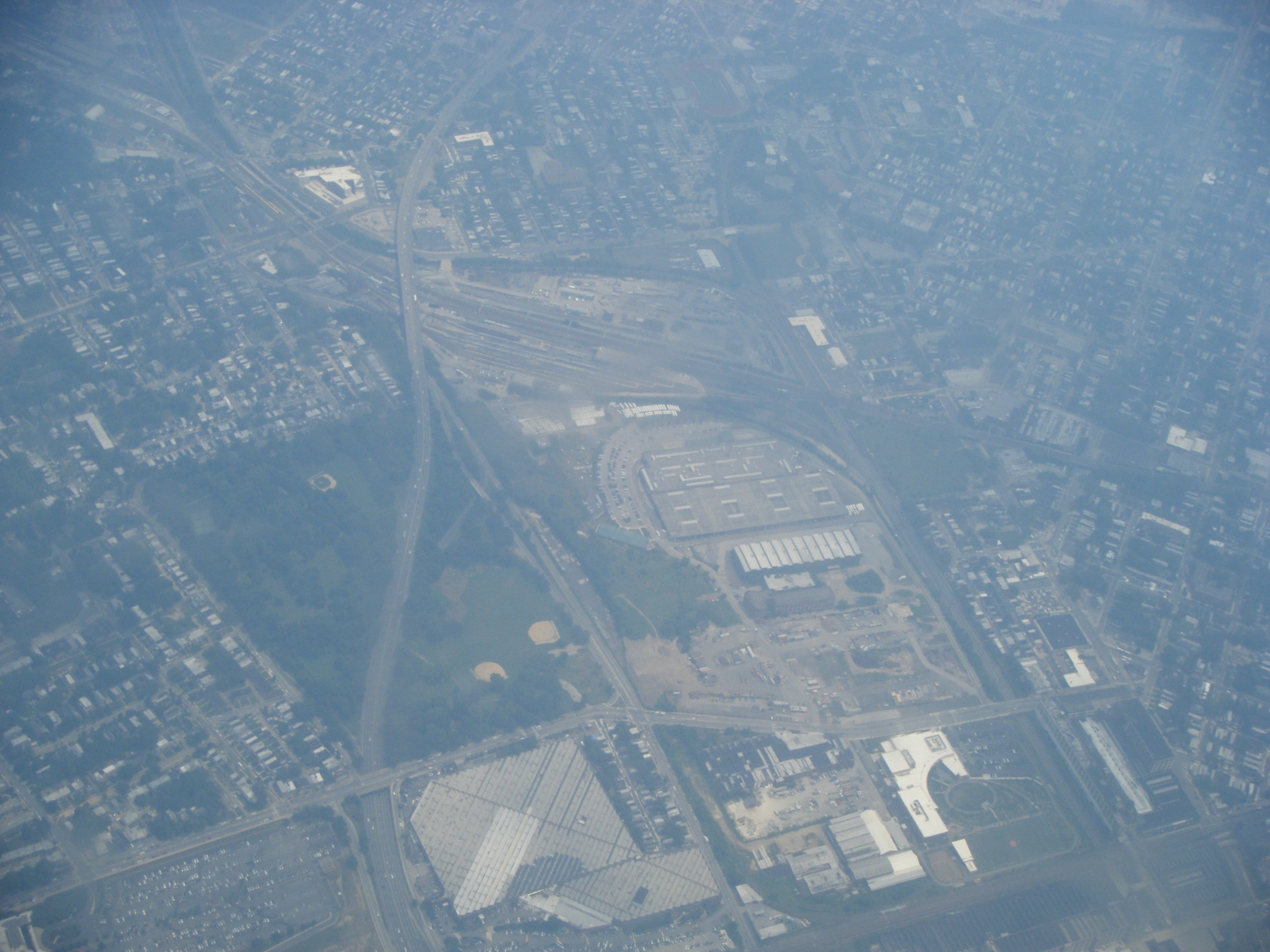
Aerial view of Nicetown-Tioga

The boundaries of Philadelphia neighborhoods are often not universally agreed upon, resulting in no official boundaries. Some of the neighborhood boundaries can include:

- Wingohocking Street to the northeast (beyond which lies Logan);
- Clarissa/Windrim to the northwest (beyond which lies Germantown);
- Allegheny Avenue and the SEPTA rail tracks to the south (beyond which lie Allegheny West and Glenwood); and
- Old York Road to the east (beyond which lies Hunting Park).

The Philadelphia City Planning Commission (PCPC) defines Nicetown as a much smaller area bounded by Wingohocking Street, Broad Street, Hunting Park Avenue, and Clarissa Street; it defines Tioga as a smaller area bounded by Broad Street, Hunting Park Avenue, the railroads [exact western boundary unclear], and Allegheny Avenue.

== History and economy ==
=== 1700 to 1850 ===
Nicetown began centuries ago as a small town in what was then rural Philadelphia County, outside the City of Philadelphia (which occupied the area known today as Center City). Mease notes that Nicetown was named for Hans te Neues, a Mennonite immigrant who purchased the land of present-day Nicetown in 1699. Family legend among the Nice/Nyce family states that Hans threw a bottle of schnaps over his first house to christen it. This original early 18th-century structure burned in 1800. Hans and his brother Jan had emigrated from Amsterdam in 1698; Jan settled in Germantown. Both were Mennonite ministers and could read and write. Hans and his descendants were well known as zimmermen (builders of houses). One descendant was a member of the Carpenter's Society of Philadelphia in the early 1800s. Another was Captain John Nice of Germantown, who led the charge at the Battle of Germantown during the Revolutionary War. Other authors provide varied suggestions for the origin of Nicetown. Finkel says that it was "[n]amed for de Neus, Dutch Huguenots who settled there about 1700".

In 1729, Elizabeth McGawley, "an Irish lady who had brought over a number of tenantry," was said to have attended Mass at Nicetown. Not far was the home of John Michael Browne (1703-1750), of Tuam, Ireland. He came from the West Indies in 1742 and purchased acreage in the area and was said to be a "priest." Paul Miller held services at his home near present day 7th St. and West Hunting Park Avenue. It served Catholics living in nearby Frankford, Germantown, Nicetown and what would become Franklinville. Services were held by priests from Saint Joseph's and those traveling to and from Philadelphia.

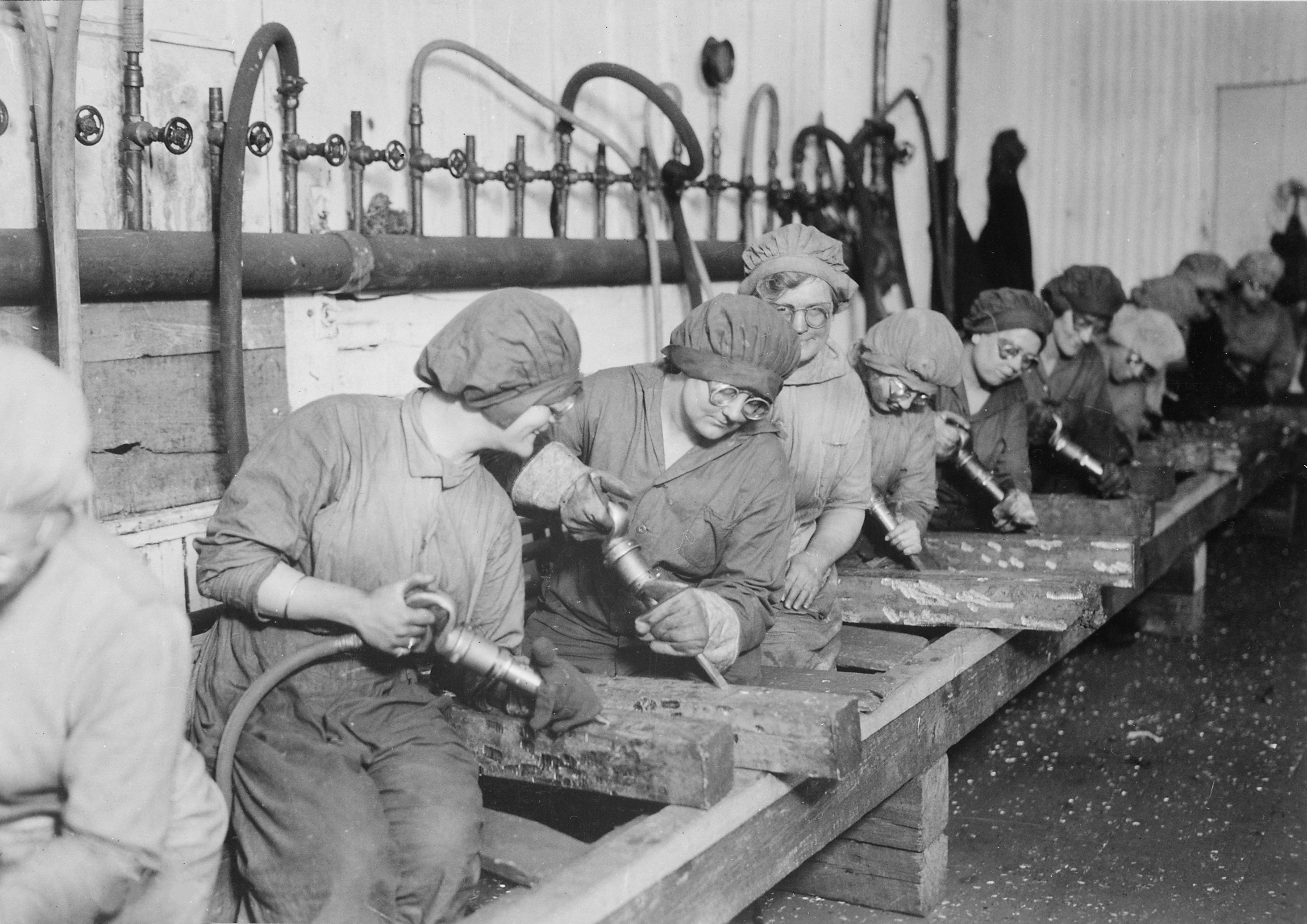
Women workers in the ordnance shops of Midvale Steel and Ordnance Company in Nicetown during World War I (1918)

Tioga is a placename used in various places. According to several sources, Tioga is a Mohawk and Iroquois word referring to a place where a stream or river current forks or runs swiftly. The name has been used in North Philadelphia since at least the mid-19th century.

=== 1950 to present ===
The industrial culture of the area peaked during World War II, and declined immediately following the war. White flight began in the 1950s and hastened in the 1960s through the 1980s. There are a number of abandoned structures and a high crime rate in the neighborhood (leading some to note the irony of its name).

In November 2016, SEPTA board members approved a $26.8 million natural gas power plant near Wayne Junction Station. It is an 8.8-megawatt plant and would allow regional rail to function in the event of a blackout. Noresco will design the two piston-engine generators that will be located between the Roberts Avenue Rail Yard and the Midvale Bus Depot.

== Demographics ==
As of 2021, Nicetown–Tioga was 75.5% African American, 24.5% white. Though it is a predominantly black neighborhood, there is an increasingly significant number of Hispanics, particularly in the southeastern section near Hunting Park.

== Education ==
=== Public libraries ===
Free Library of Philadelphia operates the Nicetown–Tioga Branch at 3720 North Broad Street. The Free Library of Philadelphia also runs a Hot Spot location in Nicetown, operating out of Mercy Neighborhood Ministries, the purpose of which is to increase computer access to residents.

== See also ==
- Max's Steaks

== General bibliography ==
- Finkel, Kenneth, ed. (1995), Philadelphia Almanac and Citizens' Manual, Philadelphia: Library Company of Philadelphia, pp. 156–170, ISBN 0-914076-89-2
