= Calvary United Methodist Church (Philadelphia) =

Church in Philadelphia, PA, United States of America

Coordinates: 39.948303°N 75.218852°W

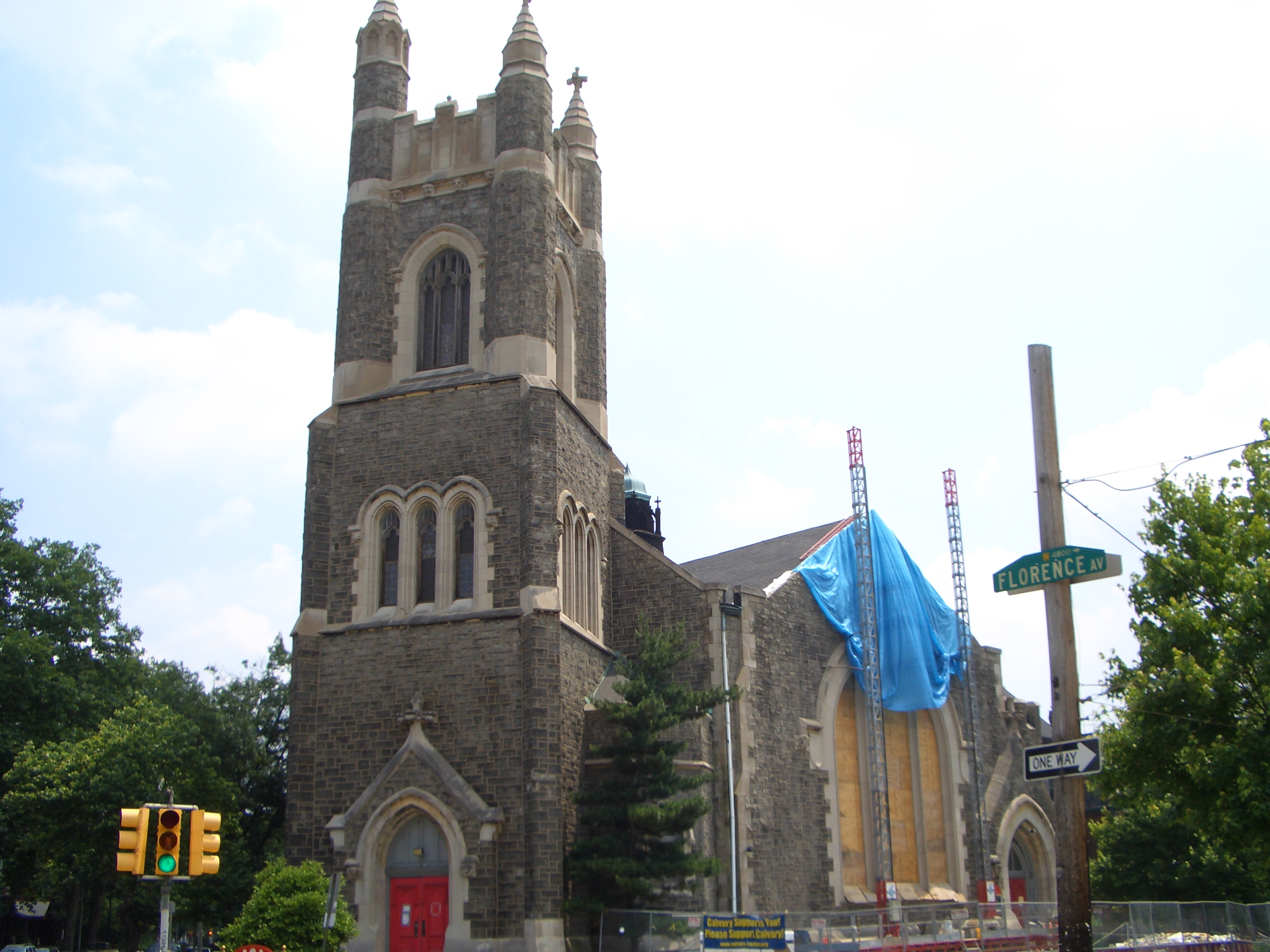
The church undergoing renovation in 2005

Calvary United Methodist Church is a Methodist church located in Philadelphia, Pennsylvania, United States, on the southeast corner of 48th Street and Baltimore Avenue. The church was founded in 1895 as Calvary Methodist Episcopal Church and the current structure was completed in 1907.

The church rents space in its building to a number of religious and community groups. The church also is home to "Calvary Center for Culture and Community" (CCCC), an affiliated non-profit organization that raises funds for building restoration and facilitates use by community groups.

Calvary UMC is a member of the Reconciling Ministries Network, a movement within the United Methodist Church to formally and intentionally welcome LGBT persons to full inclusion in the life of the church. The congregation made this declaration in 1985, shortly after the network's formation.
