= Immaculate Conception Roman Catholic Church (Northern Liberties), Philadelphia =

Coordinates: 39.96591°N 75.13736°W

Immaculate Conception Roman Catholic Church
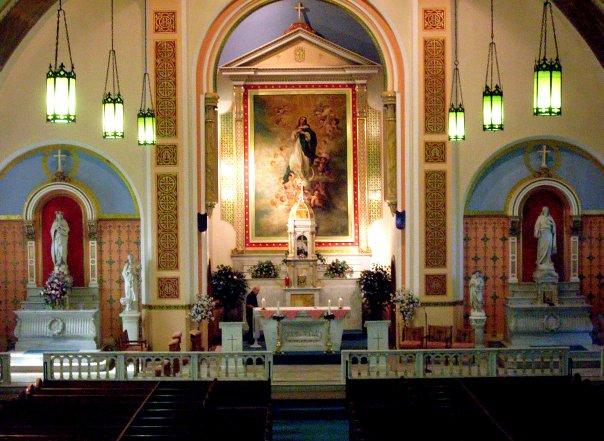
- Immaculate Conception Roman Catholic Church
- Location: Philadelphia
- Country: USA
- Denomination: Roman Catholic

The Immaculate Conception Roman Catholic Church is located at Front and Allen Streets in Philadelphia, PA 19123 in the Northern Liberties, Philadelphia, Pennsylvania section of the city; after over 140 years as an independent parish, it became a worship site of the adjacent St. Michael's parish in 2011. The parish celebrated its 150th anniversary in 2019, having been founded in 1869 under the leadership of Bishop James Frederick Wood. Twenty-five years earlier, two Catholic parishes within about a mile of the church—St. Augustine Church, Philadelphia at 4th and Vine and St. Michael at 2nd and Jefferson—were burnt to the ground in violent anti-Catholic nativist riots. The church continued as an independent parish or as a worship site for almost 150 years until, in the fall of 2019, it was announced that the church building would be closed permanently.

== Founding and History through End of 20th Century ==
At the time of its founding, the area surrounding the church was largely composed of row houses which were home to Irish immigrants (although the ground for the church complex itself had earlier housed a spoke factory at Front and Canal (now Allen) Streets). Later the area became industrialized through the early part of the twentieth century.

In the early 1970s, much of it was gutted by the construction of Interstate 95 in Pennsylvania which emptied five blocks in the parish of houses and caused the demolition of houses on many other blocks in the way of the road. In the early part of the 21st century the area began to undergo a continuing process of gentrification with thousands of newly constructed and rehabilitated housing units as well as an increased workforce with the arrival, about three blocks from the church, of the SugarHouse Casino which anticipates an ultimate workforce of 1,500 full and part time positions and is planning an onsite hotel. (As for housing, the local Northern Liberties Neighborhood Association estimates an increase of close to 10,000 new residents in the area since 2000.)

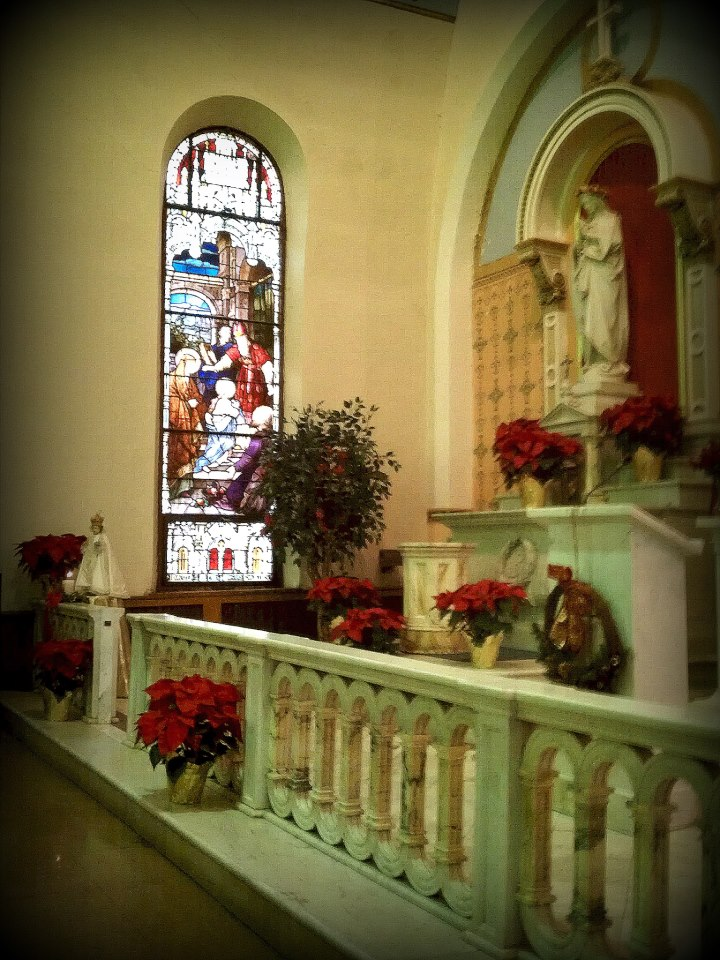
The Mary Altar/Shrine at Immaculate Conception Church in Northern Liberties, Philadelphia, decorated for Christmas .

== Twinning of Parish with St. Michael ==
In the spring of 2000, Immaculate Conception was twinned with St. Michael's parish (two of the 22 parishes twinned at the time) and a single pastor was appointed for both churches. In 2010, a former parochial vicar at the parish, the then-Msgr. Michael J. Fitzgerald, was ordained an auxiliary bishop for the Archdiocese of Philadelphia.

== Suppression of Parish: Continuation of Church as Worship Site ==
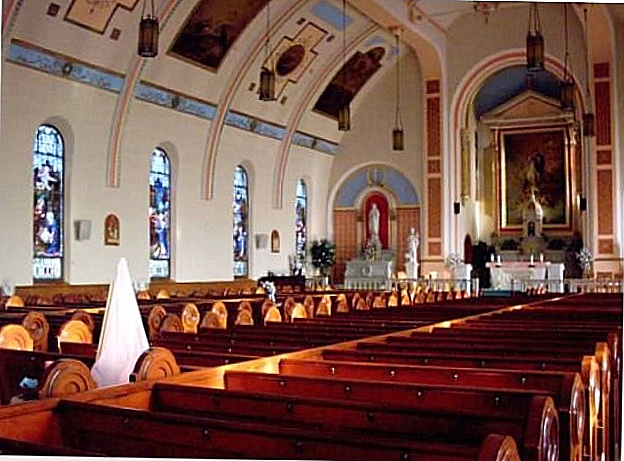
Interior of Church at Dusk on 6 July 2009

In February 2011, it was announced by the then-parochial administrator, Reverend Eugene C. Wilson, and the Vicar for the Philadelphia-South portion of the Archdiocese, Monsignor Kevin Lawrence, that the status of the church would be changed from that of a twinned parish to that of a worship site of St. Michael's; this means that, while the church would be used for Sunday Masses, and occasional sacramental celebrations, such as weddings, funerals and baptisms, it would no longer be an independent parish. This change was completed as of July 1, 2011.

In December, 2017, the Masses were discontinued because of continuing problems with the heating system and were then moved to St. Michael church. Since then Mass has not been held on a regular basis at Immaculate, although a Mass was celebrated on the Feast of the Assumption 2018.

Immediately prior to its suppression, the parish boundaries encompassed the area from Delaware River at Susquehanna Ave. south to Green St. then west to 3rd St., north to Girard Ave. and east to Susquehanna Ave. to Delaware River. Any Catholic living in this area would normally have been a member of the parish. In addition to the portion of the parish in Northern Liberties, much of it was in Fishtown, Philadelphia, Pennsylvania. Following the suppression of Immaculate Conception Parish, this territory was added to that in which residents were already considered parishioners of St. Michael Parish.

== Closure of the Church Building ==
Less than two months before its 150th anniversary and about fourteen months after the last Mass was celebrated in the building on August 15, 2018 (for the Feast of the Assumption), it was announced, in October 2019, that the building would be closed and no longer used as a church. The reasons given were that the building, without a working heating system for several years, had deteriorated to the point where it was unsafe for public use and the cost of remediating the problems was prohibitive, far beyond the means of the small congregation of under 100 people active in the parish.

In light of this, a process to relegate the church building to allow it to be used for profane was to be undertaken.

A final prayer event to mark the closing of the building was held on the 150th anniversary of the church's dedication, December 8, 2019, when a prayer service including the Rosary was to be held outside the building with a group of former parishioners.

== Education ==
The parish designated St. Michael School as its parochial grade school.
