= City of Conquerors Church, Philadelphia =

Coordinates: 39°57′44″N 75°14′48″W

City of Conquerors
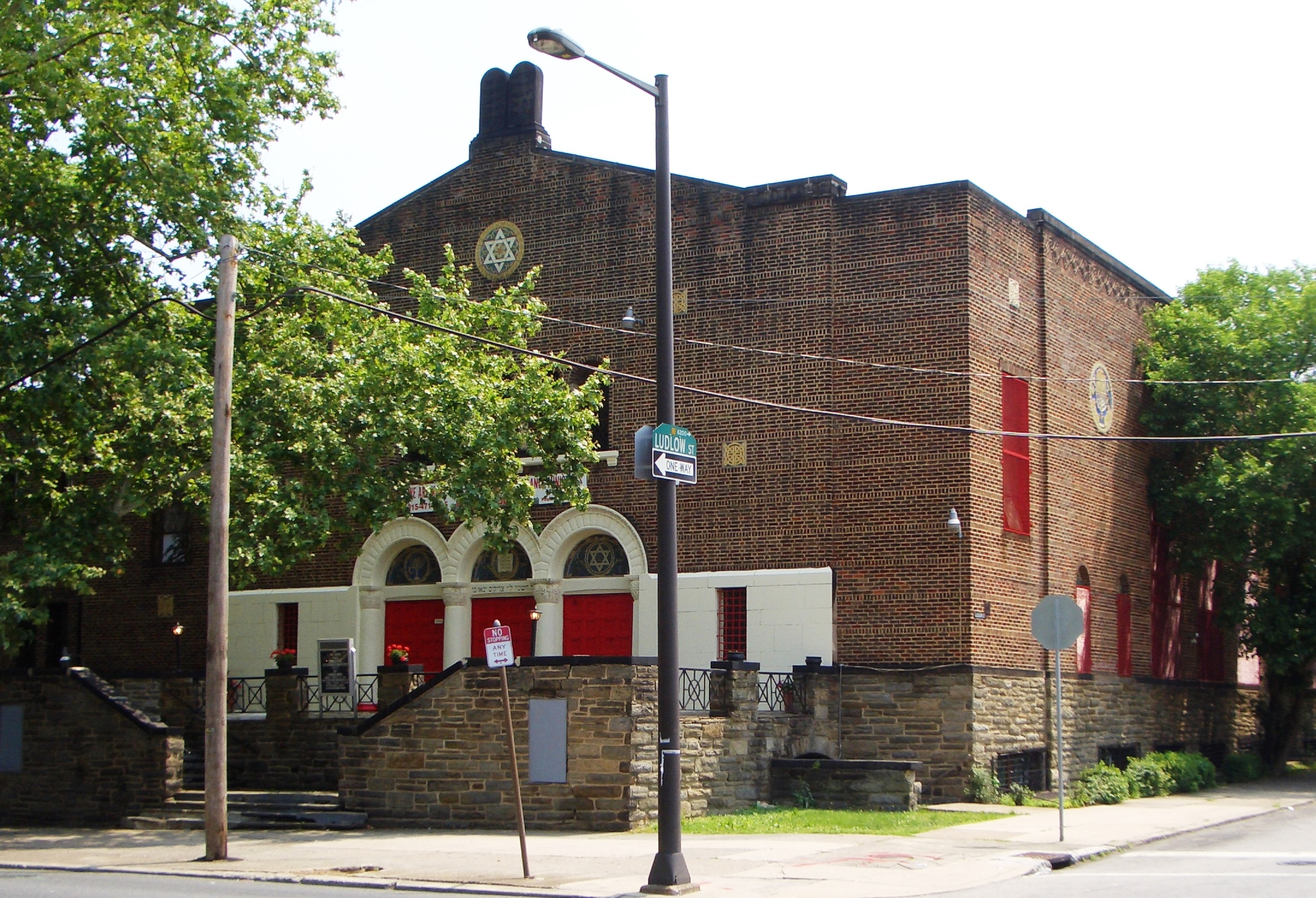
- from the southwest corner
- City of Conquerors
- Location: 11 South 63rd Street, Philadelphia, PA 19139
- Website: City of Conquerors Church Official Website

Architecture
- Demolished: c. 2013

Clergy
- Pastor(s): Donald and Deborah Parks

City of Conquerors was a church started by We Are More Than Conquerors Deliverance Ministries. Prior to its demolition, the building was formerly the West Philadelphia Jewish Community Center, as evidenced by the Jewish symbols on the exterior of the building at 11 South 63rd Street, Philadelphia, Pennsylvania.

== Gallery ==
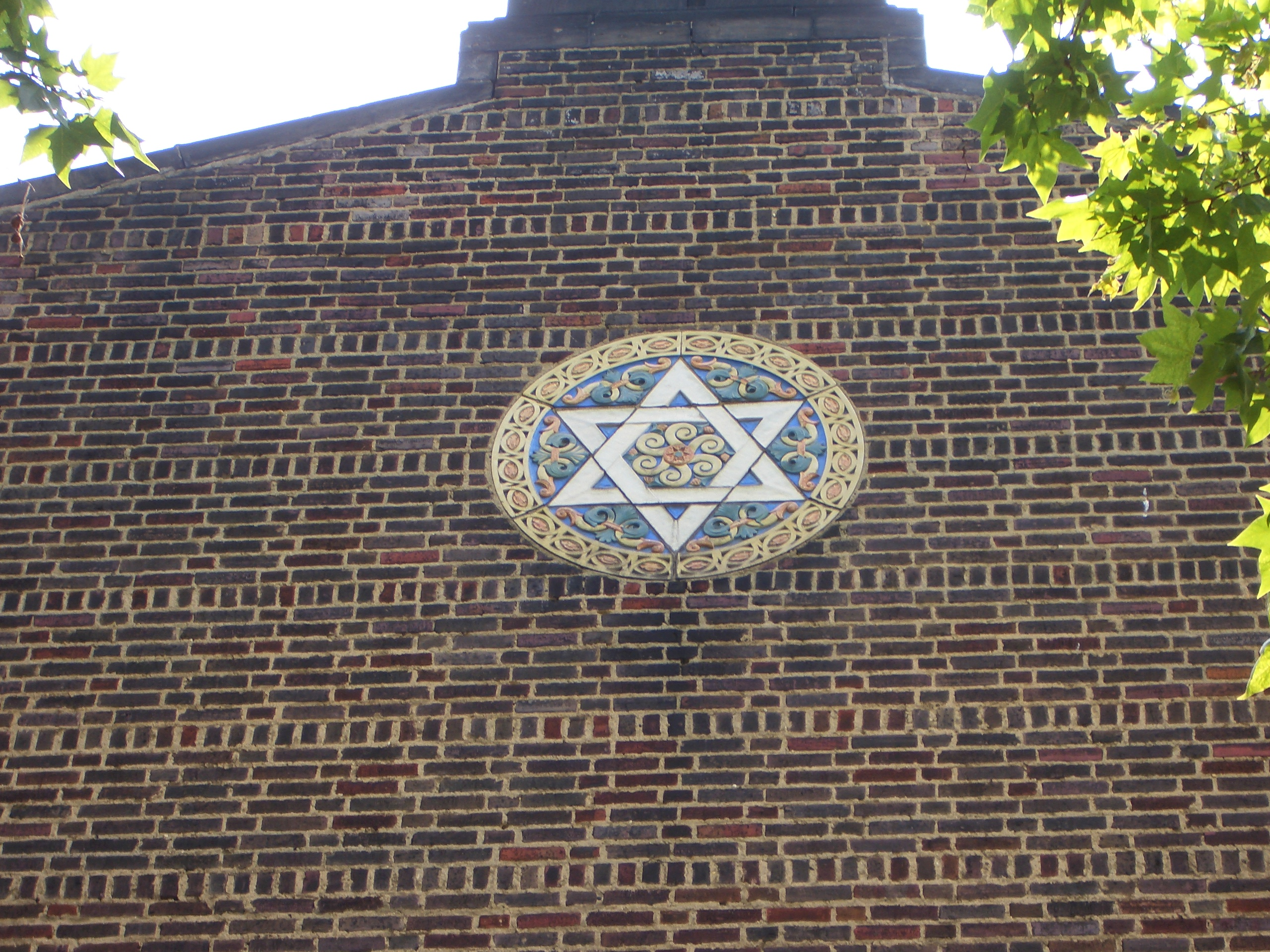
Tile art high up wall (west side)

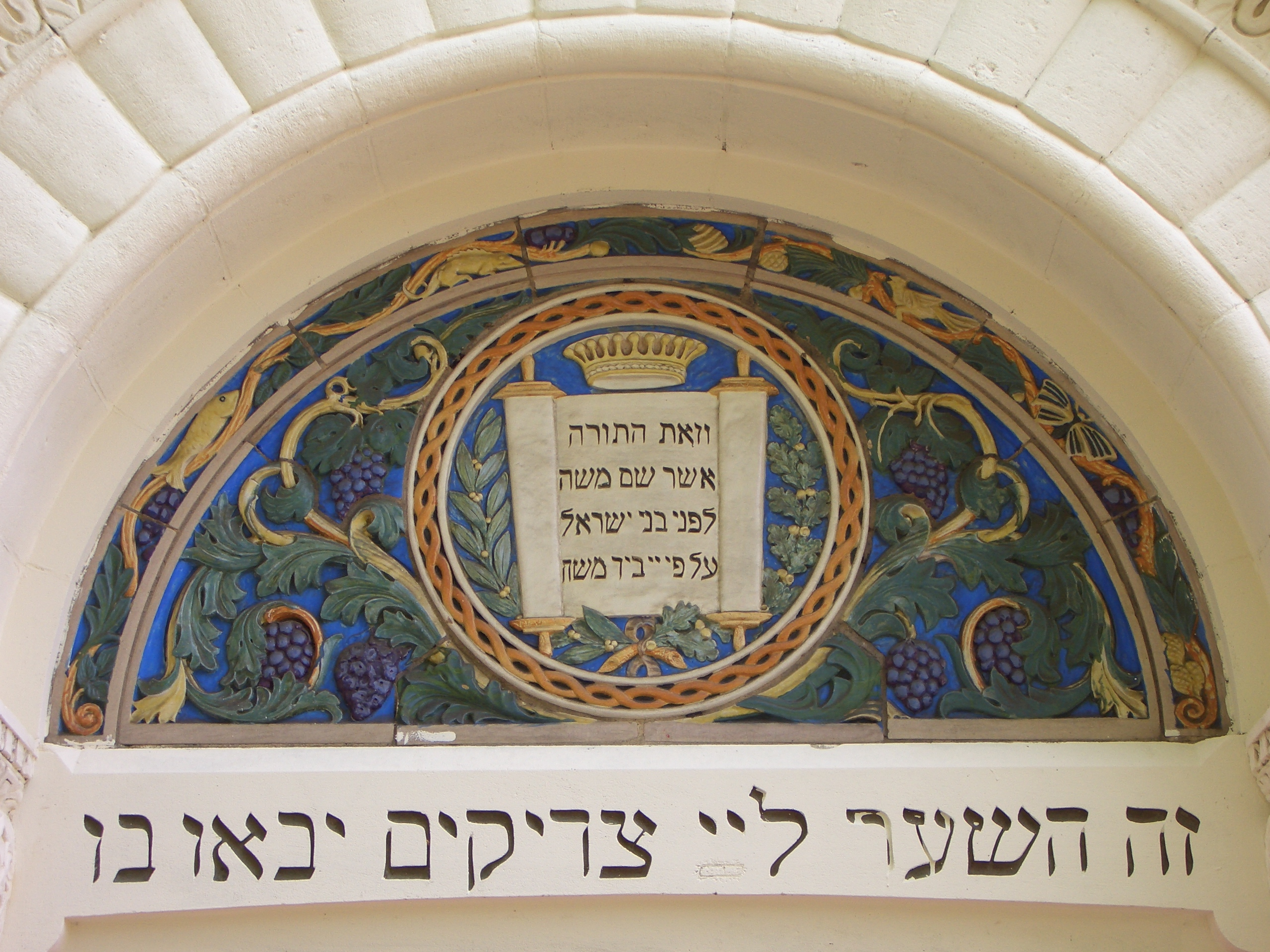
Tile art above center doorway (west side).

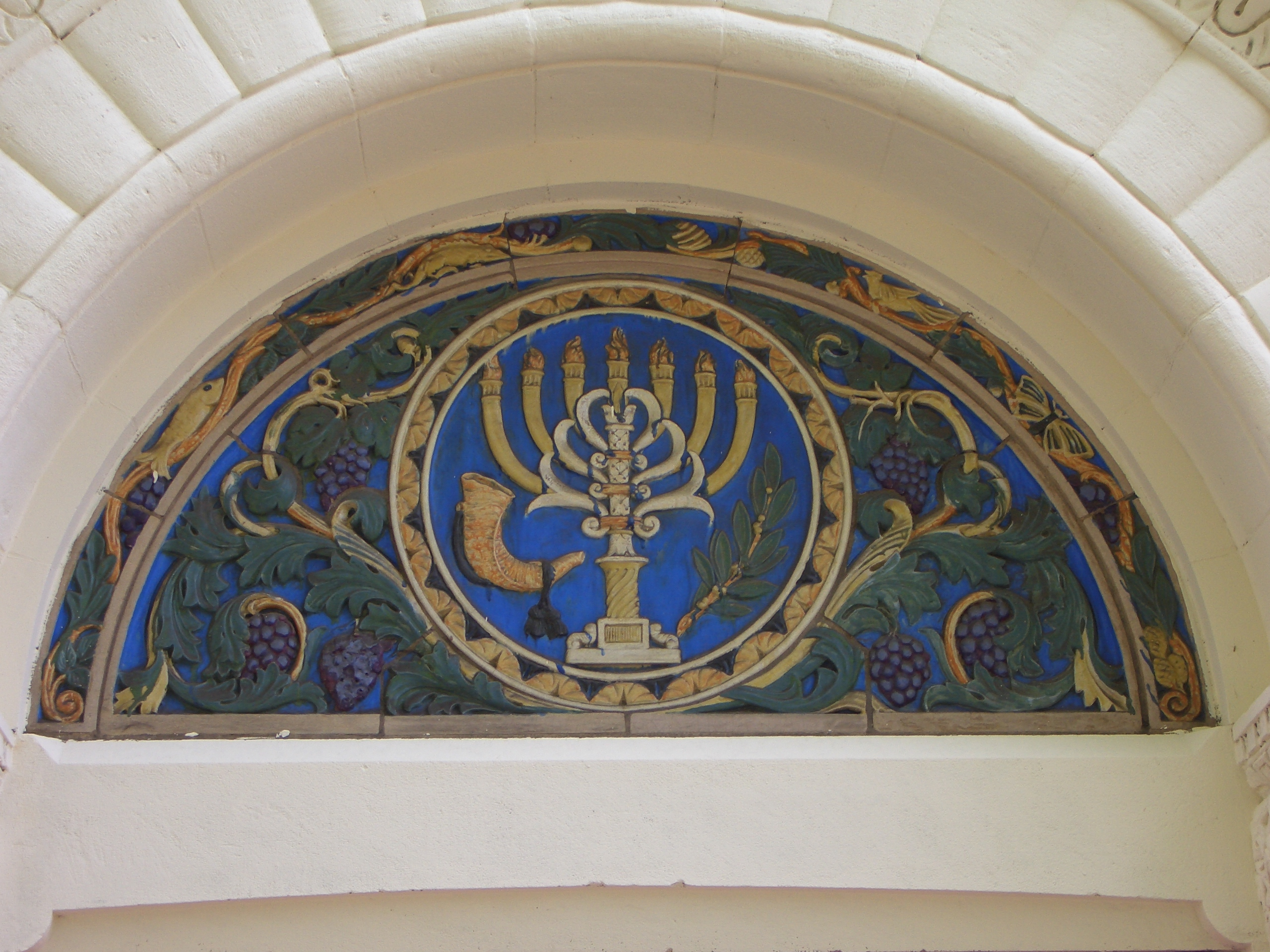
Tile art above left-hand doorway (west side).

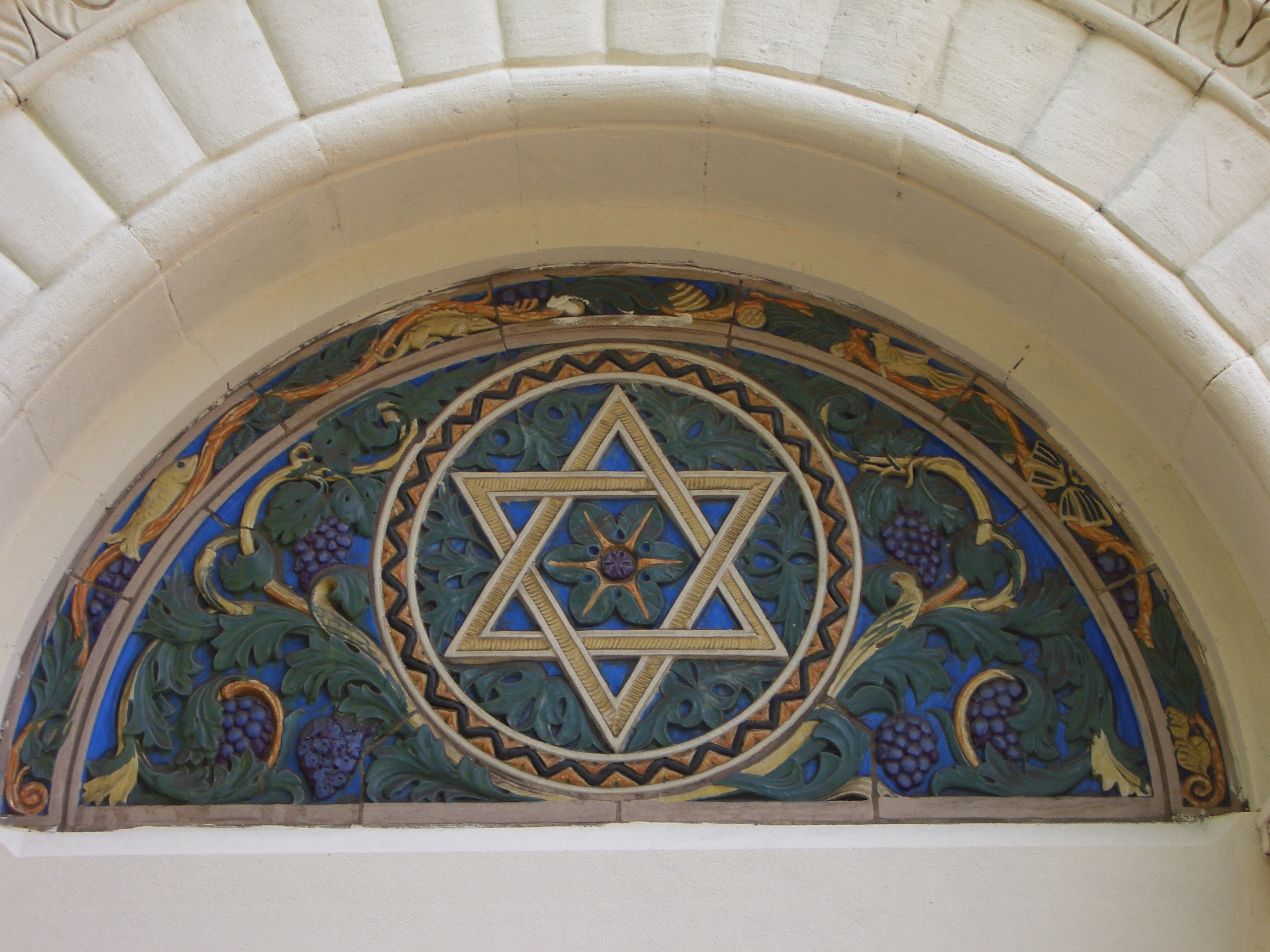
Tile art above right-hand doorway (west side).
