= St. Michael's Roman Catholic Church (Philadelphia) =

Historic Roman Catholic Church and Parish

Coordinates: 39.97335°N 75.13862°W

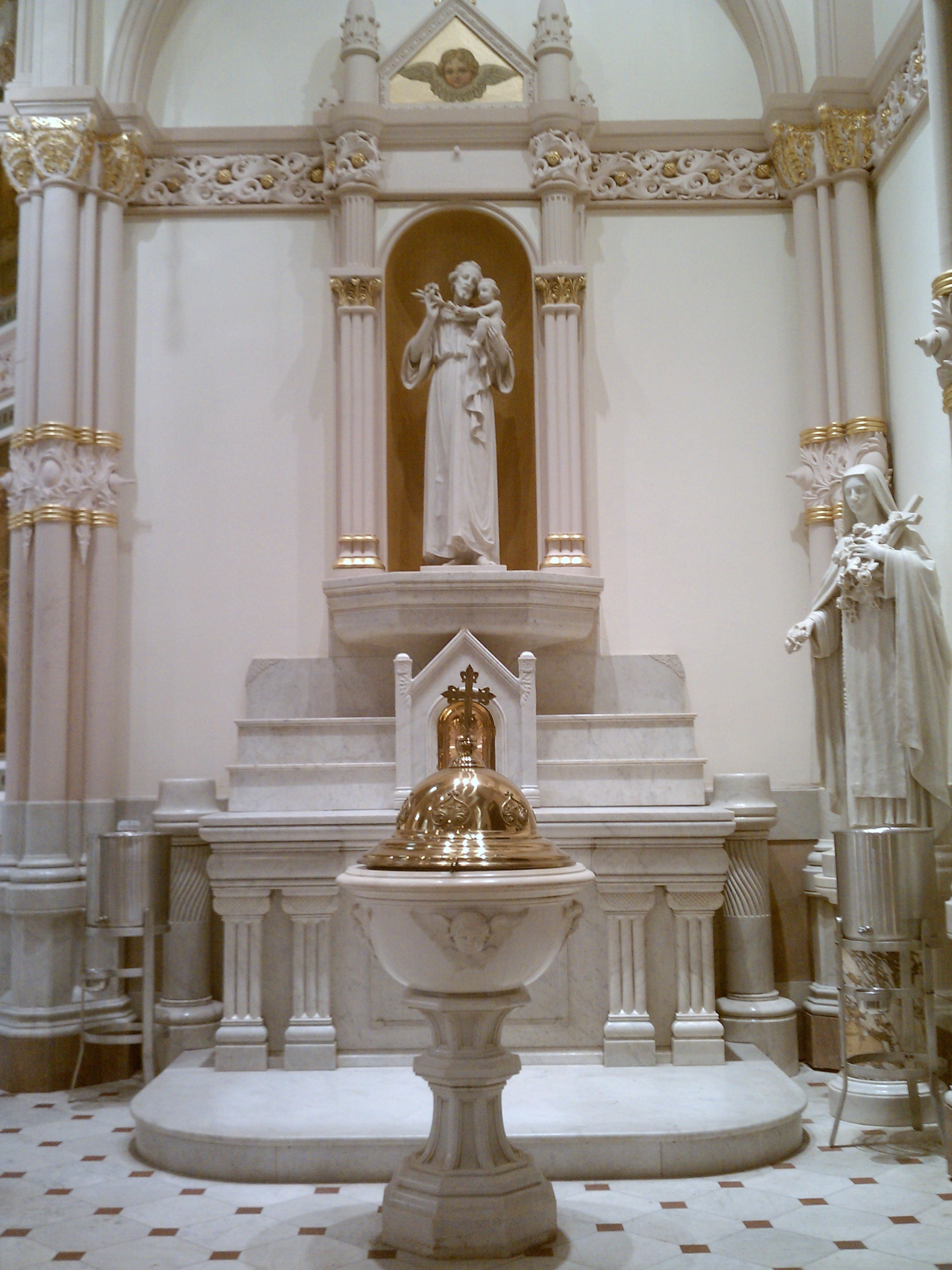
The Baptismal font in front of the St. Joseph's altar at St. Michael's Church

The Church of Saint Michael (commonly known as St. Michael Church, or Saint Michael's) is an active parish of the Roman Catholic Archdiocese of Philadelphia located at Second and Jefferson Streets in Philadelphia, in the West Kensington section of the city (sometimes referred to as "Old Kensington").

== Today ==
The parish assumed its current configuration under Parish Administrator Msgr. John J. Miller, when St. Michael's absorbed the neighboring parish of Immaculate Conception in July 2011. Msgr. Miller served as parochial administrator at St. Michael's from early 2011 until he was replaced in 2014 by the Rev. Arturo Chagala, who had been ordained in the Denver Archdiocese in 2013. As of December 2019, the church has daily Mass at 8:30 a.m. Monday through Friday along with Masses on Sunday at 9:30 a.m. (English) and 11:30 a.m. (Spanish). All of these Masses are in the Main Church at St. Michael's. Additionally, beginning with the winter of 2017-18, due to heating problems in the parish's worship site at 1020 N. Front Street (Immaculate Conception Church ), Masses normally held there were celebrated in St. Michael's. Immaculate Conception never reopened for regular worship after this temporary closure.

After several years of inactivity, except for irregular and occasional Masses (the last being a Mass for the Feast of the Assumption on August 15, 2018), in October 2019, it was announced in a letter to parishioners that the Immaculate Conception church building would be closed because the repairs needed to reopen it were not affordable for the parish.

Although the church building at 1020 N. Front Street was closed (with the plans to relegate it to non-sacred purposes, including a possible sale), the territory of the former parish of the Immaculate Conception, suppressed in 2011, remains part of the current parish of the Saint Michael. The Administrator at the time of the closing of the worship site, estimated there were less than 100 active parishioners in October 2019.

== Founding ==
The parish was founded in 1831, the first Catholic Church in the County of Philadelphia (but not within the Philadelphia City limits) on land purchased for $3,333.00. The cemetery connected to the church was the first Catholic cemetery in the Philadelphia area. The original pastor, who served from 1833 until 1843, was the Very Rev. Terence Donaghoe, who also founded the Sisters of Charity, BVM with Mother Mary Frances Clarke and invited them to teach in the parish school.

== Destruction of the original church ==
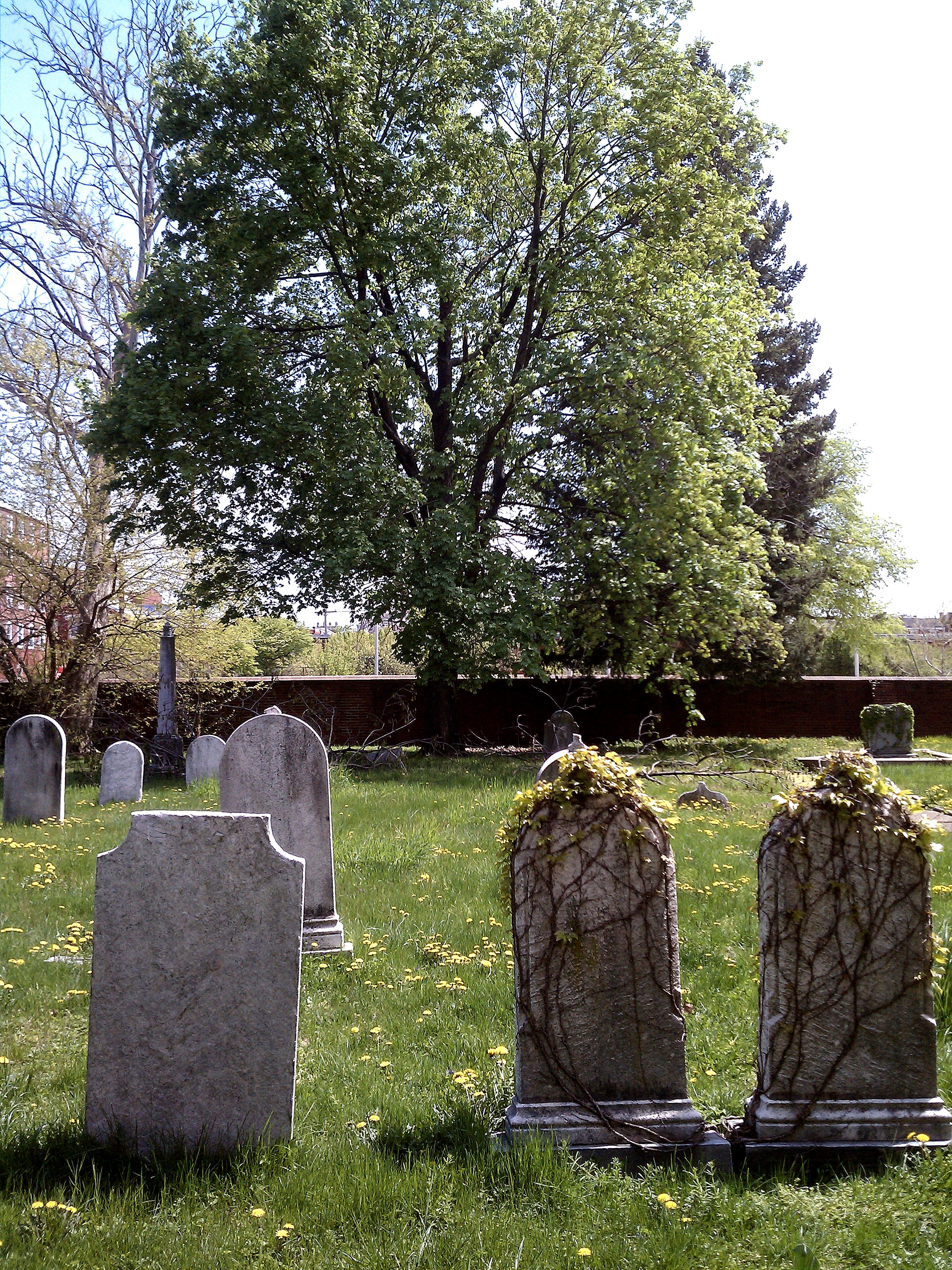
View of the churchyard at St. Michael's Church

The initial church was destroyed in the Nativist Riots of 1844. The unrest began when the Catholic Bishop Francis Kenrick petitioned the Public School Board to allow use of the Douay-Rheims (Catholic) translation of the Bible by Catholic students, instead of forcing them to use the Authorized (King James/Protestant) Version as did other students. A Nativist meeting to plan opposition to this initiative was stopped by the Irish Catholics and, following a second meeting in a local market which the Catholics considered their territory, violence broke out, during which an Irish Catholic was seriously injured and a Nativist killed after shots were fired from inside a local Irish Catholic volunteer fire house, the Hibernia Hose Company, as well as by Nativists on the street. The riots were only stopped after two Catholic churches, St. Michael's and St. Augustine's, burned, when, the following day, cannon were set up in front of the city's Catholic Cathedral (St. John the Evangelist) and General George Cadwalader, who was in command of the state militia, threatened to shoot on anyone continuing the disorder.

It took several years for the church to be rebuilt, along the pattern of the original church, using an award of $27,000.00 granted in December, 1847 in a suit against Philadelphia County for failing to protect the church and surrounding buildings.

Several long term changes resulted from the 1844 riots. First, the "outlying" districts of Philadelphia County, like Kensington, Northern Liberties and Southwark (where St. Philip Neri Church was also almost destroyed by fire) were incorporated into the City of Philadelphia and the police and fire departments in those areas unified with the city's. Secondly, Bishop Kenrick, dropped the tactic of trying to influence the treatment of Catholic students in the public schools in favor of creating exclusive parochial schools for Catholic children.

== Changes of population and area ==
The membership of the church, at that time largely an Irish parish adjacent to the handloom weaving mills in Kensington where both Catholic and Protestant Irish immigrants worked, grew exponentially after the Great Famine in the late 1840s, but, as the surrounding area saw the founding of additional Catholic churches, its territory and population dropped as the Catholics in the area were divided among other parishes.

Today, the parish boundaries extend broadly from West Kensington into Kensington, Fishtown and Northern Liberties, increasing notably after it assumed the territory of the neighboring Immaculate Conception Parish in 2011 when that parish was suppressed and made a worship site of St. Michael's. In addition, there is a significant Latino population, mostly concentrated in West Kensington, along with other ethnic groups in the remaining parts of the parish.

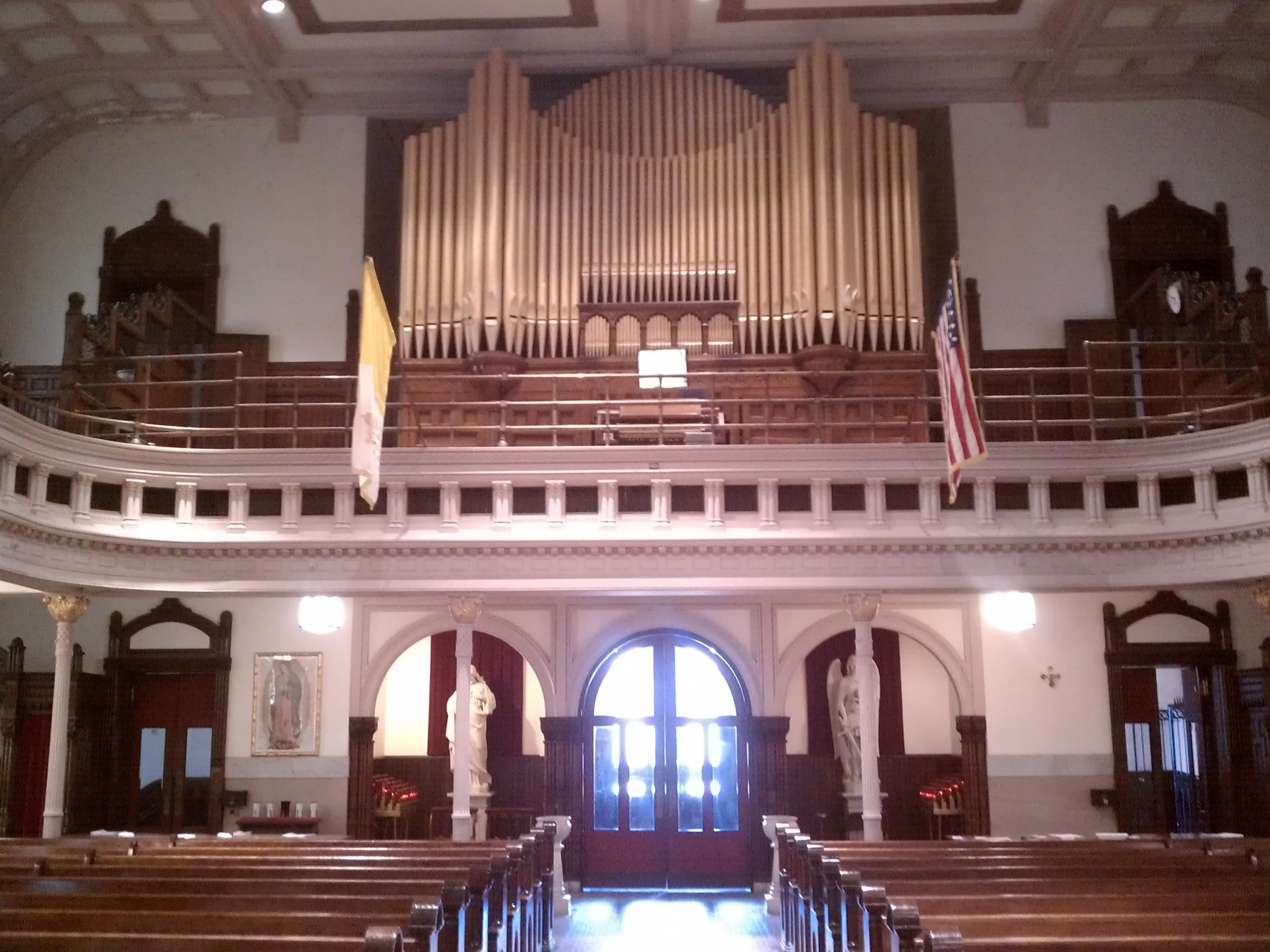
The rear of the church, showing the organ, with American and Papal flags flying from the front of the choir loft.

== Links with educational institutions ==
As of 2020 the church does not designate a particular parochial school.

La Salle University began at the St. Michael’s School at Second and Jefferson Streets in Philadelphia when the Christian Brothers opened a school there and taught their first classes on July 20, 1858. Initially known as the “ Select School,” it eventually took the name “Christian Brothers Academy.” In 1863, the Academy became the college preparatory division of what was then La Salle College. In 1867, La Salle moved to Juniper and Filbert Streets; ultimately, the campus relocated to the Olney Section of Philadelphia in 1929. The High School separated from the College and moved to Wyndmoor in the 1960s. However, the connection with LaSalle lives on in a new school opened several years ago in one of the parish buildings.

Several years after St. Michael's Parish School closed, in 2000, the vacant convent was converted for use as LaSalle Academy of Philadelphia, a grade school meant to serve children from the immediate area of the parish which includes among its trustees members of the Christian Brothers and the Sisters of St. Joseph. It features class sizes of 15 or less, with an 11-month academic calendar.

== Other buildings ==
The church formerly hosted St. Michael's Business School, which it closed in the early 1990s due to a lack of students and the curriculum becoming obsolete. In 2013 the church announced it intended to sell the building, which had been previously used by charter school and La Salle Academy.

== See also ==
- Great Train Wreck of 1856
