= Richard Worsam Meade =

Richard Worsam Meade may refer to several related people:

- Richard Worsam Meade I (1778–1828), American merchant and art collector
- Richard Worsam Meade II (1807–1870), United States Navy captain
- Richard Worsam Meade III (1837–1897), United States Navy rear admiral
