= Richard Meade =

Richard Meade may refer to:

- Richard Meade, 2nd Earl of Clanwilliam (1766–1805), Irish peer
- Richard Meade, 3rd Earl of Clanwilliam (1795–1879), British ambassador
- Richard Meade, 4th Earl of Clanwilliam (1832–1907), British Royal Navy officer and peer
- Richard Kidder Meade (colonel) (1746–1805), George Washington aide-de-camp
- Richard Kidder Meade (1803–1862), Virginia lawyer, plantation owner and politician
- Richard Henry Meade (1814–1899), English surgeon and entomologist
- Richard John Meade (1821–1894), British Indian Army general
- Richard Worsam Meade I (1778–1828), American merchant and art collector
- Richard Worsam Meade II (1807–1870), United States Navy officer
- Richard Worsam Meade III (1837–1897), United States Navy officer
- Richard Meade (equestrian), British Olympic equestrian gold medalist
- Sir Richard Meade (judge), British High Court judge

== See also ==
- Richard Mead (1673–1754), English physician
- Richie Meade (born c. 1955), American lacrosse coach
