= Robert Meade =

Robert Meade may refer to:

- Robert Henry Meade (1835–1898), head of the British Colonial Office
- Robert Leamy Meade (1842–1910), officer in the United States Marine Corps
