= George Meade (merchant) =

American merchant, politician and slave trader

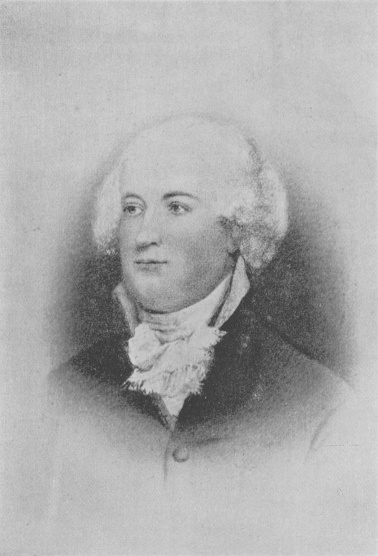
Portrait by Thomas Lawrence, c. 1790

George Meade (February 27, 1741 – November 9, 1808) was an American merchant, politician and slave trader best known for being the grandfather of Civil War general George Gordon Meade. In partnership with Thomas Fitzsimons, his firm was among the largest provision merchants during the American Revolutionary War, and helped finance the Bank of Pennsylvania and Bank of North America during the conflict—while it profited from British goods as well. Meade's business went bankrupt by 1801 due to investments in the Yazoo land scandal, and was continued by his son Richard W. Meade.

Meade held minor city offices and was active in religious and civic life, among others serving as a trustee at St. Mary's Roman Catholic Church and founding the Friendly Sons of St. Patrick. Descendants amplified these accomplishments into a legendary patriotism, though his influence has been assessed more modestly by recent biographers.

== Early life ==
George Meade was born in Philadelphia, the youngest child of Mary Stretch (or Stritch) and Robert Meade. Mary was from a Barbadian and Philadelphian merchant family; Robert was an Irish immigrant from County Limerick who moved to Philadelphia around 1732. He had lived in either the Bahamas or Barbados, and was a provision merchant who traded with the British Caribbean. He also donated to the establishment of St. Joseph's, the first Roman Catholic Church in Philadelphia. After becoming sick on St. Croix in July 1754, Robert died between August 13 and 26 at Philadelphia, leaving an estate of £79 11s 11 1/2d. George and his siblings Garrett and Catherine were educated on Barbados by their uncle George Stretch, before returning to their native city.

== Philadelphia merchant ==
Garrett and Meade went into business together importing rum, sugar and slaves. They joined the nonimportation agreement against the Stamp Act of 1765—a symbolic move because it did not significantly affect their business, unlike the opposition to the Townshend Acts which they abstained from. Catherine married Thomas Fitzsimons; he and George were founders of the Friendly Sons of St. Patrick, and Fitzsimons joined the firm after Garrett left. Meade & Company invested in western Pennsylvania land as well as the British Caribbean. In April 1775 George joined the Third Battalion of Associators, and in the prelude to independence he served on the Continental Association as well as the Committee on Inspection and Observation.

During the American Revolution—after the Meade family briefly fled to Chester County during the British occupation of Philadelphia—Meade & Company invested £2,000 in the Bank of Pennsylvania to help fund the Continental Army in 1780, and likewise invested in the Bank of North America. However, the firm also speculated on British stocks and imported British goods via Martinique, thus profiting from both sides of the war; Meade did not serve in any battles.

After the war the firm suffered from the recession of 1783–1784, and particularly from failed European investments and western land speculation. Fitzsimons left the partnership, which had accumulated a debt of £30,000. Meade saved his business and reputation with a £10,000 loan from Londoner John Barclay, which helped him settle all his debts. In Philadelphia newspapers from 1784 to 1788 he advertised Spanish wines and Caribbean spirits as well as coffee, tea, sugar, molasses, sheet copper and German textiles.

A Federalist like the influential Fitzsimons, he marched in the Grand Federal Procession and served in minor political offices: on the Philadelphia Common Council 1789 to 1792 and as chairman of the Board of Management for the Inspectors of the Prisons in 1792. Meade's temperament, described by descendants as "eccentric", as well as "testy" and prone to profanity, may have limited his opportunities.

In religious and civic associations he was more active, serving as a trustee for St. Mary's Roman Catholic Church and donating $50 to the construction of St. Augustine's, what would become Georgetown University and (having freed his slaves) he also donated outside his faith to the African Church. In 1763 he had helped found the Fishing Company of Fort St. David. He was a manager of the Philadelphia Dancing Assembly and the Philadelphia Dispensary, in 1790 a founder of the Hibernian Society for the Relief of Emigrants from Ireland and in 1792 vice-president of the Sunday Schools. During the yellow fever epidemic of 1793, he remained in Philadelphia to aid the sick, occasionally supporting physician Benjamin Rush.

His business definitively failed during the Panic of 1796–1797 due to investments in the Yazoo land scandal; he had purchased over 230,000 acres of Georgia land between 1794 and 1796. By 1801 he was bankrupt, with his son Richard W. Meade managing his estate, and in 1804 he quit business life altogether.

== Personal life and death ==
George Meade married Henrietta Constantia Worsam, the daughter of Barbados planter Richard Worsam, on May 5, 1768. She was Anglican although George was Catholic, a pattern repeated in several generations of the Meade family. They had five sons and five daughters, who were baptized Catholic, though all but two predeceased their father—and many were buried in Protestant churchyards. He died in Philadelphia on November 9, 1808, at age 67, and was buried at St. Mary's. His daughter Elizabeth then followed Henrietta to England, while his son Richard continued the family business.

== Legacy ==
Meade was not particularly well known in his day, and no collection of his papers survives, but he achieved fame as the grandfather of Civil War general George Gordon Meade. For his role in the American Revolution his profile was sculpted on the Catholic Total Abstinence Union Fountain at the Centennial Exposition. Richard W. Meade III wrote the article "George Meade, a Patriot of the Revolutionary Era" in 1891, which was used uncritically by late 19th and early 20th-century sources.

According to his entry in American National Biography, "Meade has been included among several founders of elite Philadelphia families who supposedly formed a cohesive, long-lasting national upper class, but little actual evidence supports this claim of inherited greatness. ... [L]ater biographers considered [his] quiet virtues insufficiently heroic for the grandfather of a famous general."

== See also ==
- John Leamy – contemporary Philadelphia merchant

== Bibliography ==
- Atzbach, Nicole (2016). Portraits in Conversation: Francisco de Goya and Vicente López y Portaña (lecture). Meadows Museum. Event occurs at 35m17s.
- Campbell, John H. (1892). History of the Friendly Sons of St. Patrick and of the Hibernian Society for the Relief of Emigrants from Ireland: March 17, 1771—March 17, 1892. Philadelphia: Hibernian Society.
- Chandler, Charles L. (June 1953). "Catholic Merchants of Early Philadelphia". Records of the American Catholic Historical Society of Philadelphia. 64 (2): 94–103. JSTOR 44210305.
- Frederick, John H. (1933). "Meade, George". In Malone, Dumas (ed.). Dictionary of American Biography. Vol. XII. New York: Charles Scribner's Sons. pp. 473–474.
- Klepp, Susan E. (February 2000). "Meade, George". American National Biography. doi:10.1093/anb/9780198606697.article.0101287.
- Meade, R. W. [III] (1888–1891). "George Meade, a Patriot of the Revolutionary Era". Records of the American Catholic Historical Society of Philadelphia. 3: 193–220. JSTOR 44208740.
- "One Mixed Marriage". American Catholic Historical Researches. New Series. 1 (1): 92–93. January 1905. JSTOR 44374497.
- Stowe, Christopher S. (May 2005). A Philadelphia Gentleman: the Cultural, Institutional, and Political Socialization of George Gordon Meade (PhD dissertation). University of Toledo.
