= USS Meade (DD-274) =

Clemson-class destroyer

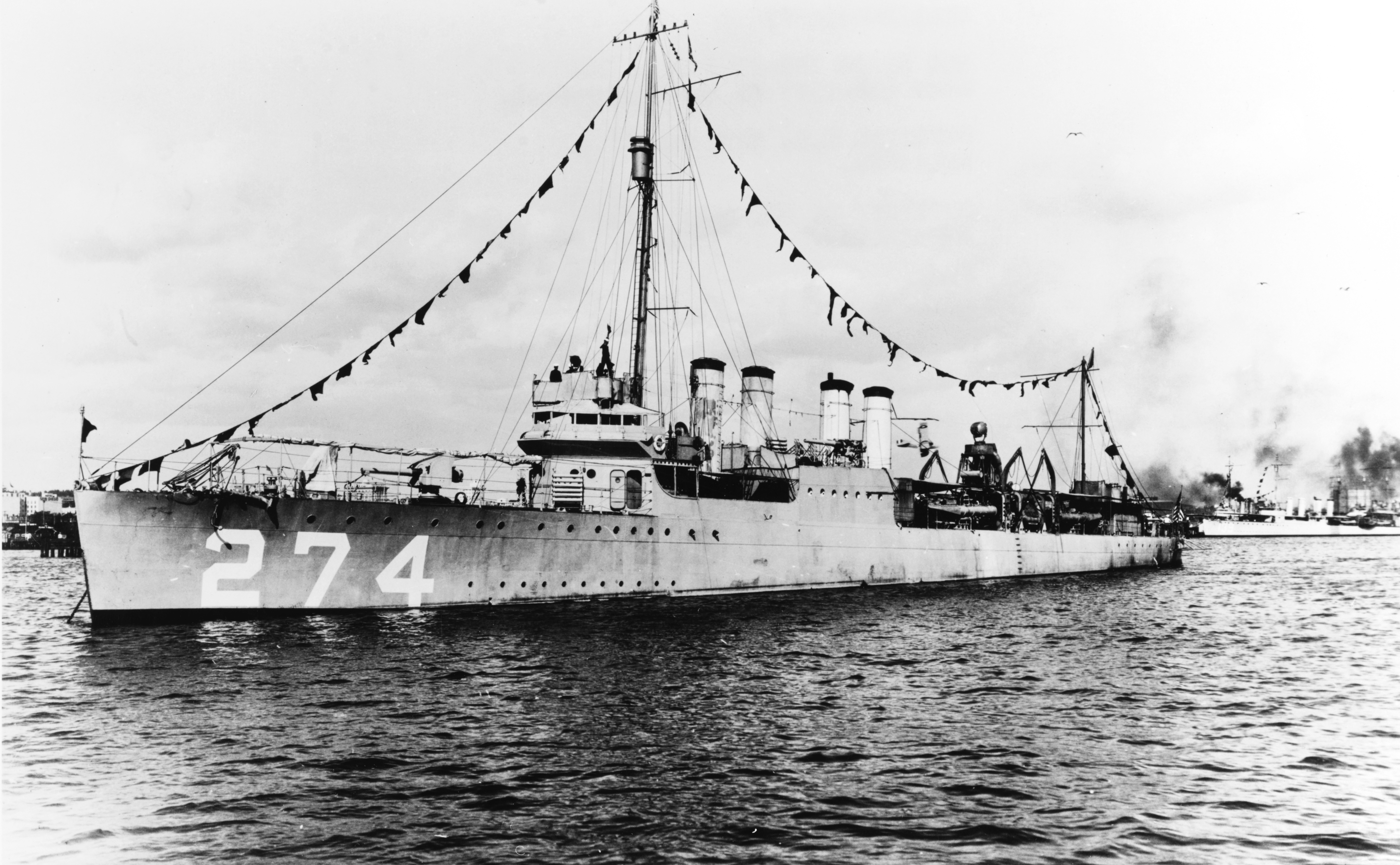
- USS Meade

History

United States
- Name: USS Meade
- Namesake: Richard Worsam Meade and Robert Leamy Meade
- Builder: Bethlehem Shipbuilding Corporation, Squantum Victory Yard
- Laid down: 23 September 1918
- Launched: 24 May 1919
- Commissioned: 8 September 1919
- Decommissioned: 18 December 1939
- Stricken: 8 January 1941
- Identification: DD-274
- Fate: Transferred to United Kingdom, 26 November 1940

United Kingdom
- Name: HMS Ramsey
- Acquired: 26 November 1940
- Identification: Pennant number: G60
- Fate: Sold for scrap, 18 February 1947

General characteristics
- Class & type: Clemson-class destroyer
- Displacement: 1,190 long tons (1,209 t)
- Length: 314 ft 5 in (95.83 m)
- Beam: 31 ft 8 in (9.65 m)
- Draft: 9 ft 4 in (2.84 m)
- Installed power: 26,500 shp (19,800 kW)
- Propulsion: 2 × geared steam turbines; 2 shafts
- Speed: 35 kn (40 mph; 65 km/h)
- Range: 4,900 nmi (5,600 mi; 9,100 km) at 15 kn (17 mph; 28 km/h)
- Complement: 120 officers and enlisted
- Armament: 4 × 4 in (100 mm) guns; 2 × 3 in (76 mm) guns; 12 × 21 inch (533 mm) torpedo tubes

The first USS Meade (DD-274) was a Clemson-class destroyer in the United States Navy and transferred to the Royal Navy as HMS Ramsey (G60).

== Service history ==
=== As USS Meade ===
Named for brothers Richard Worsam Meade and Robert Leamy Meade, she was laid down by Bethlehem Shipbuilding Corporation, Squantum, Massachusetts, on 23 September 1918; launched on 24 May 1919; sponsored by Miss Annie Paulding Meade; and commissioned at Boston, Massachusetts, on 8 September 1919.

After shakedown along the east coast, Meade was assigned to duty with the Pacific Fleet. For more than two years afterward, she operated out of west coast ports including San Diego, California and San Francisco, California while participating in fleet and squadron maneuvers. After duty with several destroyer divisions, she decommissioned at San Diego on 25 May 1922 and was placed in reserve.

Meade recommissioned at San Diego on 18 December 1939. After returning to the east coast in 1940, she served with ships of Destroyer Squadron 9 (DesRon 9) of the United States Fleet.

=== As HMS Ramsey ===
In accordance with provisions of the Destroyers for Bases Agreement of September 1940, Meade was designated one of the 50 destroyers to be transferred to Britain. She was decommissioned from the USN and turned over to the British on 26 November 1940. Renamed HMS Ramsey (G60), she served the Royal Navy in the North Atlantic and later performed duty as an aircraft training ship. She completed her service on 30 June 1945 and was scrapped in July 1947 at Bo'ness, Scotland.
