= Friendly Sons of St. Patrick =

American non-profit for Irish-Americans

- Emblem of the Friendly Sons and Daughters of St. Patrick
- Formation: March 17, 1771
- Founded at: Philadelphia, Pennsylvania, U.S.
- President: Anne Peckham
- Vice President: Tim Hennessey
- Treasurer: John Heenan
- Secretary: Colleen O'Riordan
- Website: Official website

The Friendly Sons of St. Patrick/Friends Sons and Daughters of St. Patrick, officially The Society of The Friendly Sons of St. Patrick for the Relief of Emigrants from Ireland, is an American charitable and social organization for Irish Americans. It was founded in 1771.

== Organizational history ==
=== Founding and purposes ===
The Society was founded in Philadelphia, Pennsylvania on March 17 (St. Patrick's Day), 1771.

Among the founders were General Stephen Moylan, aide to George Washington and cavalry commander in the Revolutionary War, and Thomas Fitzsimons, representative of Pennsylvania in the Continental Congress and signatory of the U.S. Constitution, both of whom were born in Ireland. George Washington became an honorary member in 1782.

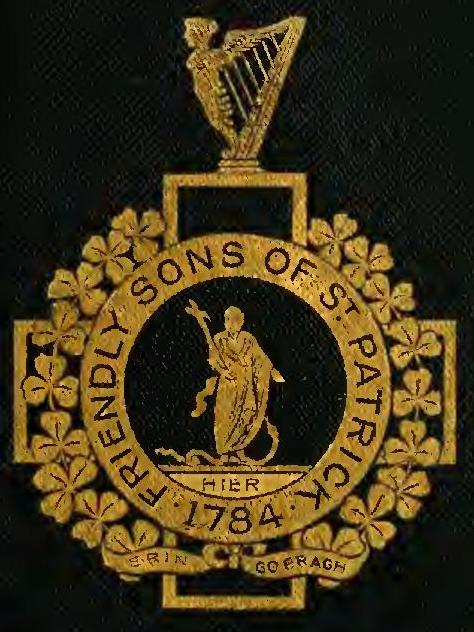
Seal from book cover

Originally founded as a charitable organization with the intent of aiding migrants from Ireland, the organization has since developed a focus on encouraging "greater interest in ties of friendship between America and Ireland," in addition to sponsoring scholarships, cultural events, charity activities, and educational endowments.

=== New York City and other branches ===
On March 17, 1784, a group of New York City's Irish officers who had served in the Continental Army formed the Society of the Friendly Sons of St. Patrick in the City of New York. Its founder and first president was Daniel McCormick, a merchant who was one of the first directors of the Bank of New York.

Branches of the Society have also been founded in cities such as Cincinnati, Detroit, Providence, San Diego, and Spokane. The Cincinnati branch has an active glee club which has performed hundreds of benefit and goodwill performances for over 40 years.

Each branch operates independently. Originally all-male, the Philadelphia branch first admitted women in 2016. The New York branch plans to admit women to its annual pre-St. Patrick's Day fundraising dinner for the first time in 2018, but has not said whether women will be admitted as members.

== Founding members ==
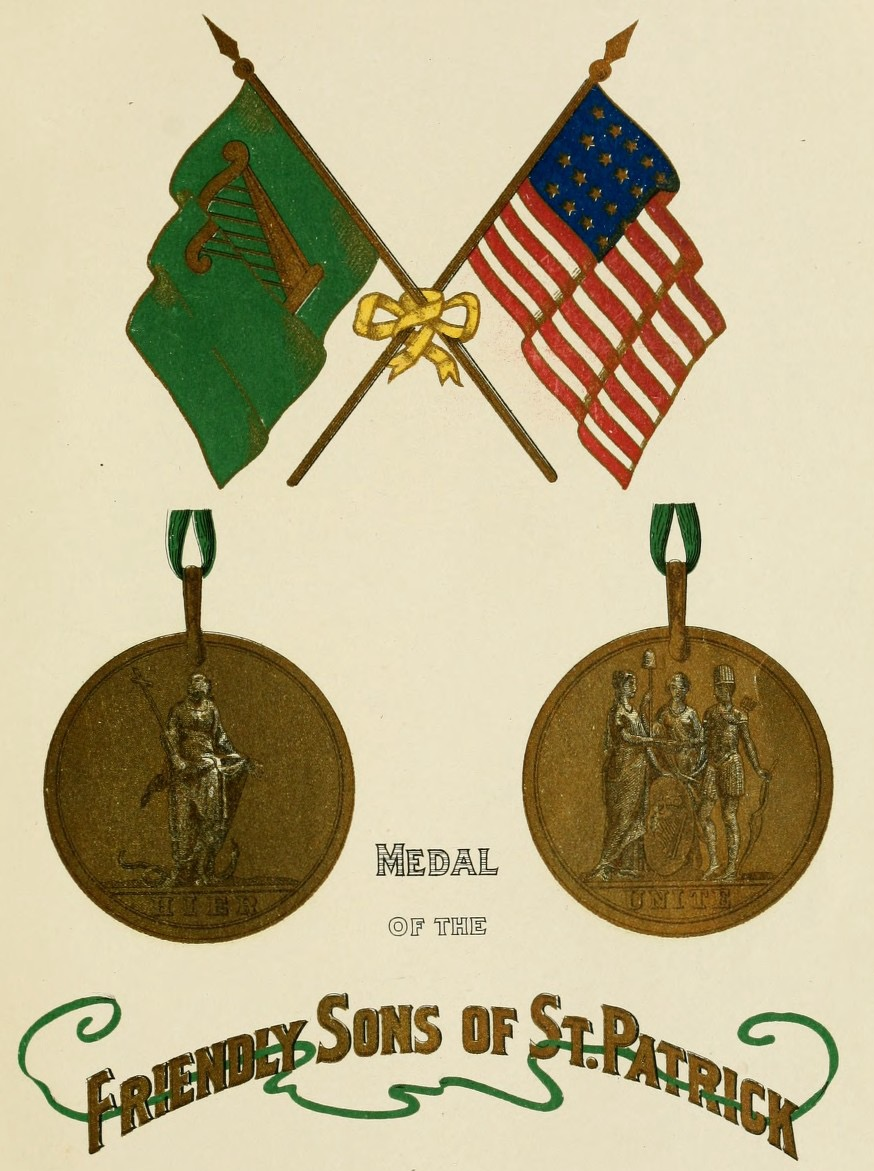
Medal of The Friendly Sons of St. Patrick

General Stephen Moylan was one of the Society's organizers and its first president. Other founding members included:

- Thomas Barclay
- John Nixon
- William West
- Thomas Fitzsimons
- George Meade

Other early members included:

- John Leamy
- Commodore John Barry
- General Anthony Wayne
- General John Cadwalader
- General William Irvine
- General Richard Butler
- General William Thompson
- Tench Francis Jr.

Honorary members included:

- George Washington
- Robert Morris
- Richard Bache
- John Dickinson

== List of presidents ==
1. Stephen Moylan - 1771
2. John M. Nesbitt - 1773
3. William West - 1774
4. Benjamin Fuller - 1776
5. Thomas Barclay - 1779
6. George Campbell - 1781
7. John M. Nesbitt - 1782
8. Thomas McKean - 1790
9. Stephen Moylan - 1796
10. Hugh Holmes - 1800
11. Joseph Tagert - 1818
12. Robert Taylor - 1850
13. Gen. Robert Patterson - 1856
14. William Brice - 1882
15. William J. Nead - 1884
16. John Field - 1886
17. William McAleer - 1888
18. William Brice - 1890
19. Gen. St. Clair A. Mulholland - 1892
20. Edwin Sydney Stuart - 1894
21. Hugh McCaffrey - 1896
22. James Gay Gordon - 1898
23. William Gorman - 1900
24. William B. Hanna - 1902
25. John M. Campbell - 1904
26. Gen. Thomas J. Stewart - 1906
27. Edward J. Dooner - 1908
28. Rear Adm. George W. Melville - 1910
29. Thomas A. Fahy - 1912
30. Theodore F. Jenkins - 1914
31. Michael J. Ryan - 1916
32. Charles B. McMichael - 1918
33. Joseph P. Rogers - 1920
34. John M. Patterson - 1922
35. Thomas James Meagher - 1924
36. William H. McElwee - 1926
37. David J. Smyth - 1928
38. Frank Smith - 1930
39. James Francis Ryan - 1932
40. Frank W. Melvin - 1934
41. Michael Donohoe - 1936
42. Roland S. Morris - 1938
43. Harry S. McDevitt - 1940
44. Barry H. Helpburn - 1942
45. Clare G. Fenerty - 1944
46. John W. Laird - 1946
47. Vincent A. Carroll - 1948
48. Raymond A. White Jr. - 1950
49. Gerald A. Gleeson - 1952
50. Bennett E. Tousley - 1954
51. John J. Reilly - 1956
52. John H.H. Morrow* - 1957
53. F. Raymond Hughes - 1957
54. Owen B. Hunt - 1959
55. Frank E. Rodgers - 1961
56. James H. J. Tate - 1963
57. John F. Thornton - 1965
58. William M. Lennox - 1967
59. John F. Kull Jr. - 1969
60. H. Benedict Ripkee - 1971
61. Charles S. Drain Jr. - 1973
62. Edward R. Malloy - 1975
63. Lewis M. Evan Jr.* - 1977
64. John F. Wilson - 1979
65. Sherwood R. Mercer - 1982
66. James J. Coyne Jr. - 1984
67. Gen. William Buchanan Gold Jr. - 1986
68. Richard R. Torpey - 1988
69. Frank Hunter Guinn - 1990
70. John F. Donovan - 1992
71. David R. Drain - 1994
72. David W. Sullivan - 1996
73. Thomas O. Peterman - 1998
74. Thomas P. O'Malley - 2000
75. J. Thomas Showler - 2002
76. Timothy P. Dunigan Jr. - 2004
77. Russell W. Wylie - 2006
78. Edward P. Last - 2008
79. Todd Peterman** - 2010
80. Drew Monaghan** - 2010
81. Francis J. Moran - 2011
82. Bernard J. Buckley Jr.*** - 2014
83. Joseph P. Heenan - 2015
84. Kevin M. Maloney - 2018
85. Ryan M. Heenan - 2020
86. Michael F. Maloney - 2022
87. Theresa Murtagh - 2024
88. Anne Peckham - 2026

* Died in office
** Resigned
*** Resigned and removed from Society notifications
