= USS Meade (DD-602) =

Benson-class destroyer

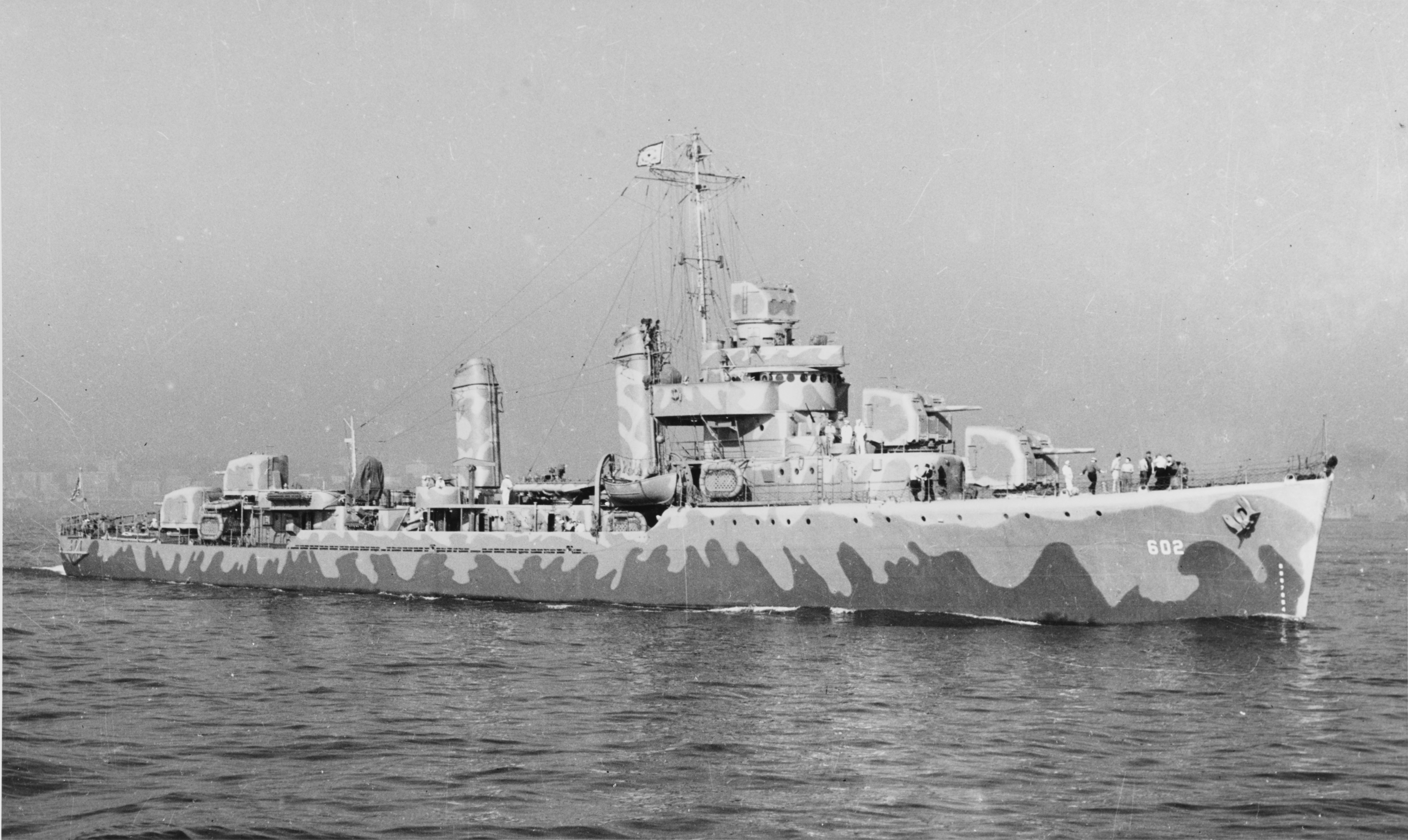
- Meade shortly before commissioning

History

United States
- Name: USS Meade (DD-602)
- Namesake: Richard Worsam and Robert Leamy Meade
- Builder: Bethlehem Mariners Harbor, Staten Island
- Laid down: 25 March 1941
- Launched: 15 February 1942
- Commissioned: 22 June 1942
- Decommissioned: 17 June 1946
- Stricken: 1 June 1971
- Fate: Sunk as a target, February 1973.

General characteristics
- Class & type: Benson-class destroyer
- Displacement: 1620 tons
- Length: 348 ft 4 in (106.17 m)
- Beam: 36 ft 1 in (11.00 m)
- Draught: 17 ft 4 in (5.28 m)
- Speed: 38 knots (70 km/h)
- Complement: 268
- Armament: 4 x 5 in (130 mm) guns; 4 x 1.1"/75 caliber guns; 7 x 20 mm guns; 5 x 21 inch (533 mm) torpedo tubes; 2 dct; 6 dcp

USS Meade (DD-602) was a Benson-class destroyer in the United States Navy during World War II. She was the second ship named for Richard Worsam Meade III and Robert Leamy Meade.

Meade was laid down by Bethlehem Steel Corporation, Shipbuilding Division, Staten Island, New York, 25 March 1941, launched 15 February 1942, sponsored by Mrs. Moray Nairne Wootton, and commissioned at Brooklyn Navy Yard 22 June 1942.

== Southwest Pacific Service ==
After shakedown out of Guantanamo Bay, Cuba, Meade sailed in the screen escorting Washington to the southwest Pacific. After arriving Tongatapu 14 September, she guarded carrier task groups defending the sea lanes between Allied bases in the South Pacific and American forces in the Solomon Islands. Operating out of Nouméa, New Caledonia, she served during the months in late 1942 during the protracted struggle for control of Guadalcanal.

As escort for Kopara and YT‑130, Meade cruised off Guadalcanal during the costly but decisive night cruiser battle 13 November. She reached Tulagi the 14th, and following the night battleship battle 14 to 15 November, she crossed Ironbottom Sound and for the better part of an hour blasted four beached enemy transports north of Tassafaronga with 5‑inch rapid fire. The transports previously had suffered aerial strafing and bombing attacks, and Meade's concentrated gunfire left them wrecks "blazing with many internal explosions." Thence she cruised the waters between Savo Island and Guadalcanal and rescued 266 men from destroyers Preston and Walke sunk during the fierce fighting of the previous night. After returning to Tulagi, she joined the search off San Cristobal 16 November for survivors from Juneau.

Between 22 November and 16 December, Meade operated as escort for Navajo during salvage operations. She screened damaged cruiser Portland to Sydney, Australia and guarded Minneapolis en route to the New Hebrides. She continued escort operations between Guadalcanal and bases in New Caledonia and the New Hebrides. During the Battle of Rennell Island, 29 to 30 January 1943, she screened escort carriers of TF 18.

== Aleutians Campaign ==
Meade departed the South Pacific 18 March for the Aleutians, arriving 15 April. During 4 months of patrol and escort duty in the North Pacific, she provided shore bombardment and fire support during the invasion and occupation of fog‑shrouded Attu Island 11 May. Before departing the Aleutians, she also took part in the bloodless occupation of Kiska Island, previously evacuated by the Japanese.

== Tarawa ==
After overhaul at Puget Sound, she steamed via Pearl Harbor to Wellington, New Zealand, 29 October for duty with the 5th Fleet Assault Force. She departed Efate, New Hebrides, 13 November and sailed as part of the fire support group of the southern task force (TF 53) for the invasion of the Gilbert Islands. She screened cruisers and provided shore bombardment support during the bitterly contested assaults on Betio Island, Tarawa, 20 November.

Two days later, Meade made an underwater sound contact while screening to westward of the transport area. Between 1530 and 1736, Meade and Frazier launched five intensive depth charge attacks. Meade's final barrage forced I-35 to surface, and both destroyers directed "a devastating fire upon the target with all batteries." Five minutes later, Meade checked her fire and at 1751, Frazier rammed the sub, hitting her port quarter abaft the conning tower. I‑35 settled and sank, stern first, at 1754.

The destroyers launched boats to recover four survivors. One was killed during a brief exchange of gunfire; as Meade's boat returned with a second, seriously wounded prisoner, an American dive bomber mistook it for a submarine conning tower and bombed it with a 500‑pound delayed fuze bomb. It landed 3 feet away, and the underwater explosion lifted the boat out of the water and holed it. Meade recovered the motor whaleboat crew who were "shaken up somewhat."

== Marshall Islands ==
Meade returned to Pearl Harbor 7 December and during the next 6 weeks trained for the invasion of the Marshall Islands. She sortied with TF 52 on 22 January 1944, and on the 30th participated in heavy bombardment of enemy installations on Taroa island, Maloelap Atoll. Arriving off Kwajalein Island the 31st, she screened battleships and cruisers during intensive shore bombardments. In addition she provided scheduled and spotter‑directed gunfire against installations on 1 and 2 February, destroying blockhouses, pillboxes, and machinegun emplacements. She remained in the Kwajalein area until 16 February, thence sailed via Majuro to Pearl Harbor, arriving the 24th.

== Caroline Islands ==
Meade returned to Majuro 8 March for screening duty with the fast carriers of TF 58. After supporting shore bombardment and airstrikes against, Mille Atoll, Marshalls, 18 March, she screened the carriers westward to the Caroline Islands. Between 30 March and 2 April TF 58 carried out intensive airstrikes against enemy positions on Yap, Woleai, and the Palaus. She supported similar strikes in western New Guinea 21 to 24 April, then protected the mighty carriers during heavy air raids against Truk and Ponape, Carolines, 29 to 30 April. She returned to the Marshalls 4 May.

Between 12 May and 10 July Meade operated out of Majuro while conducting shore bombardments and blockade patrols against bypassed islands in the Marshalls, including Wotje, Maloelap, Mille, and Jaluit. Departing Majuro 11 July, she steamed via Pearl Harbor to the west coast, arriving San Francisco 26 July. After overhaul at Mare Island, she returned to Pearl Harbor 20 September. During the next 2 months she provided training facilities for the Pacific Fleet Torpedo and Gunnery School, then sailed 1 December in the screen for Wisconsin.

== Philippines Campaign ==
Arriving Ulithi, Carolines, 9 December, Meade returned to the Marshalls 15 to 19 December escorting two merchant ships. Thence, between 25 December and 16 January 1945 she completed two escort voyages between Eniwetok and Guam. Departing the Marshalls 21 January, she steamed via Ulithi to the Philippines where she arrived the 28th for duty with the 7th Fleet. As a unit of DesDiv 27, she escorted LSTs and merchant ships from Leyte Gulf via Mindoro and Subic Bay to Lingayen Gulf, Luzon, 8 to 13 February. For more than 2 months Meade operated out of Lingayen Gulf, patrolling the approaches of the gulf and the coast of western Luzon for enemy submarines and aircraft. She returned to Leyte Gulf 5 May.

Assigned to TG 78.3, Meade enter Macajalar Bay, Mindoro, 10 May and laid down fire support during unopposed amphibious landings. She departed the area the 15th, and escorted ships to Cebu and Mindanao before returning to Leyte 20 May. She continued escort runs to the southern Philippines until 9 July; a month later she sailed for Subic Bay, arriving there just prior to Japanese capitulation.

== End of World War II and fate ==
Between 31 August and 9 September, Meade completed an escort voyage to Okinawa and back. She sailed 20 September for French Indochina; closed the coast of Table Island in the Gulf of Tonkin the 23rd; and delivered provisions and medical supplies to French military personnel. After returning to Manila Bay 29 September, she completed her duty in the Philippines and departed for the United States 2 November. Steaming via San Diego, California and the Panama Canal, she reached Norfolk, Virginia, 9 December. Two days later she began extensive overhaul. On 4 March 1946 she sailed to Charleston, South Carolina. Meade decommissioned there 17 June 1946, and entered the Atlantic Reserve Fleet. She was struck from the Naval Vessel Register on 1 June 1971, and sunk as a target in February 1973. Her ship's bell was removed prior to the sinking and is now on display at the Joint Forces Staff College in Norfolk, VA.

== Awards ==
Meade received nine battle stars for her World War II service.
