= Japanese submarine I-35 =

Type B1 submarine

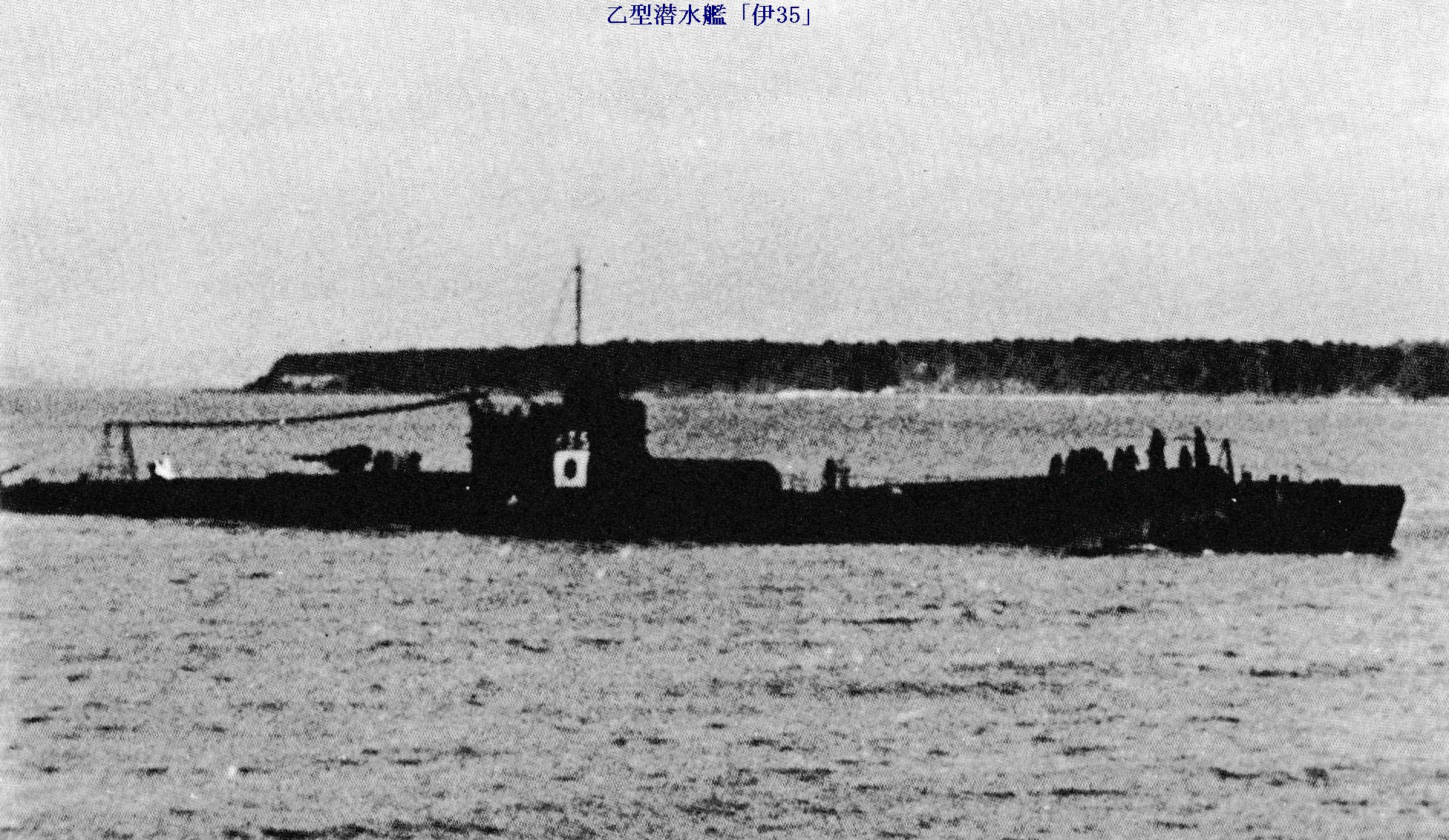
- I-35 departing harbor in 1943

History

Japan
- Name: Submarine No. 143
- Builder: Mitsubishi
- Laid down: 2 September 1940
- Renamed: I-45
- Launched: 24 September 1941
- Renamed: I-35 on 1 November 1941
- Completed: 31 August 1942
- Commissioned: 31 August 1942
- Fate: Sunk 23 November 1943
- Stricken: 10 April 1944

General characteristics
- Class & type: Type B1 submarine
- Displacement: 2,584 tons surfaced; 3,654 tons submerged
- Length: 108.7 m (357 ft)
- Beam: 9.3 m (31 ft)
- Draft: 5.14 m (16.9 ft)
- Propulsion: 2 diesels: 12,400 hp (9,200 kW); Electric motors: 2,000 hp (1,500 kW)
- Speed: 23.5 knots (43.5 km/h) surfaced; 8 knots (15 km/h) submerged
- Range: 14,000 nautical miles (26,000 km) at 16 knots (30 km/h)
- Test depth: 100 m (330 ft)
- Complement: 94
- Armament: 6 × 533 mm (21 in) forward torpedo tubes; 17 torpedoes; 1 × 14 cm/40 11th Year Type naval gun
- Aircraft carried: 1 Yokosuka E14Y seaplane

I-35 was an Imperial Japanese Navy B1 type submarine. Completed and commissioned in 1942, she served in World War II, operating in the Aleutian Islands campaign and the Battle of Tarawa before she was sunk in November 1943.

== Construction and commissioning ==
I-35 was laid down on 2 September 1940 by Mitsubishi at Kobe, Japan, with the name Submarine No. 143. Renamed I-45 by the time she was launched on 24 September 1941, she was renamed I-35 on 1 November 1941. She was completed and commissioned on 31 August 1942.

== Service history ==
=== Work-ups ===
Upon commissioning, I-35 was attached to the Kure Naval District and proceeded from Kobe to Kure. On 1 September 1942, the Japanese activated the Kure Submarine Flotilla, and that day I-35 and the submarine I-34 were assigned to the new flotilla, with I-35 as the flagship of the flotilla's commander, Rear Admiral Tadashige Daigo. I-34 replaced her as the flagship on 4 September 1942.

From 14 to 21 September 1942, I-34 and I-35 conducted work-ups in the Harima Nada in the Seto Inland Sea, during which a Yokosuka E14Y1 (Allied reporting name "Glen") floatplane assigned to I-35 was damaged beyond repair during launch-and-recovery exercises on 19 September 1942. The two submarines departed the Harima Nada on 21 September and returned to Kure on 23 September 1942. I-35 put to sea again on 6 October 1942 in company with I-34 and the depot ship Santos Maru to conduct joint exercises in the Suo Nada and the Iyo Nada in the Seto Inland Sea, returning to Kure on 13 October 1942. On 18 October 1942, she carried out torpedo attack exercises against a moving target and refueling exercises with Santos Maru. She again got underway from Kure on 19 October 1942 with I-34 and Santos Maru for joint exercises in the Iyo Nada and Bungo Strait, returning to Kure on 28 October 1942.

=== Aleutian Islands campaign ===
On 15 November 1942, I-34 and I-35 were reassigned to the Northern Force in the 5th Fleet for service in the Aleutian Islands campaign. They departed Kure in company on 28 November 1942 bound for Ōminato in northern Honshu, where they arrived on 1 December 1942. On 2 December 1942, I-35 got back underway to transport supplies to the Japanese garrison on Kiska in the Aleutian Islands. Arriving there on 8 December 1942, she unloaded her cargo and put back to sea the same day to patrol in an area of the North Pacific Ocean 20 nautical miles (37 km; 23 mi) south of Amukta. She completed her patrol on 14 December and arrived at Paramushiro in the Kuril Islands on 20 December 1942.

On 25 December 1942, I-35 set out from Paramushiro on another supply run to Kiska, calling there briefly on 31 December 1942 to discharge her cargo before moving to a patrol area in the Bering Sea northeast of Adak Island. On 7 January 1943, she received orders to divert to an area in the Bering Sea northeast of Attu to search for American cruisers that Japanese forces had sighted there. She did not find them, and on 10 January 1943 she moved to a patrol area in the North Pacific Ocean south of Kiska. She visited Kiska from 17 to 18 January, then got back underway to patrol in the North Pacific south of Kiska and Amchitka. The light cruiser Kiso and destroyer Wakaba steamed through her patrol on their way to Kiska carrying supplies and sighted what they thought was an American submarine on 23 January 1943, raising a concern that their supply mission had been compromised and prompting them to abort it and return to base, not realizing until later that the submarine they sighted probably was I-35. I-35 moved to a new patrol area north of Constantine Harbor on Amchitka on 30 January 1943, and on 14 February 1943 visited Kiska to embark a staff officer of the North Sea Defense Force and transport him to Attu. After completing her patrol, she eventually returned to Japan.

On 27 March 1943, I-35 departed Yokosuka. She arrived at Paramushiro on 1 April 1943 and was reassigned to Submarine Division 15 in the Northern Force that day. She got underway from Paramushiro on 3 April 1943 for her third supply run to Kiska, which she visited on 8 April to unload four tons of cargo and disembark staff officers of the 51st Base Force. She departed Kiska the same day and reached Paramushiro on 13 April 1943.

I-35 departed Paramushiro on 16 April 1943 to make her first supply run to Attu, where she delivered supplies and ammunition and disembarked several Imperial Japanese Army staff officers on 20 April 1943 before getting back underway the same day to return to Paramushiro, which she reached on 24 April 1943. She put to sea again on 27 April 1943 for her fourth supply run to Kiska, where she unloaded her cargo on 1 May 1943. She returned to Paramushiro on 5 May 1943.

The Battle of Attu began when U.S. forces landed on Attu on 11 May 1943, and I-35 got underway for the Attu area. On 13 May 1943, the destroyer USS Phelps, screening the battleship USS Pennsylvania off Attu, detected a stationary submarine on sonar. As Phelps was about to attack, the submarine suddenly changed speed and bearing, apparently attempting evasive maneuvers. Phelps dropped two depth charges, then lost contact. She regained contact at 15:30 and dropped five 600-pound (272 kg) and four 300-pound (136 kg) depth charges. Nearby, the light minelayer USS Pruitt signaled confirmation that Phelps had hit the submarine and reported that a metal drum and a small diesel oil slick had come to the surface. The identity of the submarine Phelps attacked is unknown, but it probably was either I-34 or I-35, both of which were in the area at the time. A depth charge presumably had knocked the metal drum off the submarine's deck, but no Japanese submarine was sunk in the action.

In foggy conditions on the morning of 15 May 1943, I-35 sighted Pennsylvania standing by as the attack transport USS J. Franklin Bell unloaded off Holtz Bay on Attu. I-35 fired torpedoes at what she identified as a light cruiser and heard two explosions. At 11:40, four torpedoes passed astern of Pennsylvania and on either side of J. Franklin Bell. Two destroyers counterattacked, dropping 58 depth charges and inflicting serious damage on I-35. I-35 called at Paramushiro from 19 to 27 May 1943, then proceeded to Kure, which she reached at 17:00 on 2 June 1943. She later moved to Kobe where repairs to her damage began on 17 June 1943.

=== Later operations ===
With her repairs complete, I-35 departed Kure in mid-September 1943 and arrived at Truk on 18 September. On 11 October 1943, she set out from Truk on a war patrol in the area of Wake Island and Hawaii, and while at sea on 16 October 1943 was reassigned to Submarine Group A. At 00:32 on 17 October 1943, the submarine USS Nautilus, which was en route Pearl Harbor, Hawaii, after conducting a reconnaissance of Makin Island in the Gilbert Islands, sighted the conning tower of a submarine that looked to her commanding officer like that of a new-construction U.S. submarine, but he later received information that he had seen a Japanese submarine, which may have been I-35.

After patrolling near Wake Island, I-35 received orders on 23 October 1943 to move to the Hawaii area. She either was 300 nautical miles (560 km; 350 mi) southwest of the Hawaiian Islands or patrolling near Canton Island in the Phoenix Islands (according to different sources) on 19 November 1943 when she was informed that Submarine Group A had been reactivated and received orders to proceed to Tarawa in the Gilbert Islands along with the submarines I-19, then operating near Fiji; I-39, then at Truk; I-169, then operating near the Marshall Islands; and I-175, then at Truk. On 20 November 1943, the Gilbert and Marshall Islands campaign began with the U.S. invasion of Tarawa and of Makin in the Gilbert Islands. I-35 was the first of the Japanese submarines to arrive in the vicinity of the Gilbert Islands, and on 21 November 1943 she reported sighting a U.S. Navy task force — probably Task Group 53.6, consisting of the escort aircraft carriers USS Sangamon, USS Suwanee, and USS Chenango and the destroyers escorting them — 70 nautical miles (130 km; 81 mi) southwest of Tarawa. The Japanese never heard from her again and declared her missing that day.

The declaration was premature, as I-35 continued her operations. On 23 November 1943, she crash-dived west of Tarawa Atoll when an aircraft attacked her with bombs at 05:20. Undamaged, she proceeded east.

=== Loss ===
By the afternoon of 23 November 1943, I-35 was operating at a depth of 65 feet (20 m) near the west coast of Betio. A surviving member of her crew later expressed the belief that she was attempting to enter Tarawa Atoll's lagoon; however, the only entrance to the lagoon for a vessel of her size, which lies 4 nautical miles (7.4 km; 4.6 mi) north of Betio, is twisting, extremely narrow, and shallow, and the lagoon itself is shallow and full of submerged reefs and shoals, making it unlikely that I-35′s commanding officer intended to enter it. Instead her commanding officer probably intended to position her to attack ships in the seaward approaches to the lagoon's entrance channel.

At 12:00 on 23 November, the destroyer USS Gansevoort detected the sound of I-35′s propellers west of Betio, but lost contact before she could make an attack. At 15:00 the destroyer USS Meade detected I-35′s propeller noises. Meade made three depth-charge attacks at 30-minute intervals without success before losing contact.

Meade requested assistance, and the destroyer USS Frazier, operating as part of the screen of the battleship USS Tennessee off Betio's southwestern tip, responded. After joining Meade, Frazier gained sonar contact on I-35 at 17:00 at a range of 2,200 yards (2,000 m) and made a depth-charge attack, with the depth charges set to explode at medium depth. She lost contact at 200 yards (180 m) but made another depth-charge attack, again setting the depth charges to explode at medium depth. At 17:20, both destroyers detected I-35 at a range of 200 yards (180 m). Soon thereafter, Frazier′s executive officer reported smelling diesel oil, and the destroyers soon sighted an oil slick on the surface. Meade made the destroyers′ final depth-charge attack at 17:38, with the depth charges set to explode with a deep setting.

The final attack inflicted heavy damage on I-35, knocking out her internal lighting, instruments, and gauges, rupturing her diesel fuel tanks, and causing dangerous flooding. With diesel fuel and seawater entering I-35′s interior, she was forced to surface and engage the destroyers with gunfire. She surfaced in between the destroyers and about 1 nautical mile (1.9 km; 1.2 mi) from each of them. Both destroyers immediately opened fire on her with 5-inch (127 mm), 40-millimeter, and 20-millimeter guns and machine guns. The destroyers observed four or five Japanese attempting to man I-35′s 140-millimeter (5.5 in) deck gun and twin 25-millimeter antiaircraft gun mount, but they all were killed or wounded, and the destroyer crews reported seeing some of the wounded retreat back inside I-35.

Frazier turned toward I-35 and worked up speed to ram her, and was making 25 knots (46 km/h; 29 mph) when she struck I-35 on her port quarter aft of her conning tower at 17:51, rupturing I-35′s pressure hull. After Frazier backed away, I-35 sank by the stern 9 nautical miles (17 km; 10 mi) west of Betio at 01°22′N 172°47′E with the loss of 92 members of her crew, her bow rising 20 feet (6.1 m) in the air before she disappeared beneath the surface. As I-35 sank, aircraft of a U.S. Navy antisubmarine patrol approached and dropped depth charges which landed within 50 yards (46 m) of her, exploding near her as they sank alongside her. At 18:00, the destroyer crews heard and felt a large underwater explosion, apparently marking the final destruction of I-35.

The destroyer crews sighted four survivors from I-35 in the water, and each destroyer launched a boat to recover them. One of them opened fire on an approaching boat crew, which returned fire and killed him, but the boats rescued the other three, all of whom were wounded. As the boats were returning to the destroyers, with one Japanese aboard Meade′s boat and two aboard Frazier′s, an SBD Dauntless dive bomber from Suwannee arrived on the scene, mistook Meade′s boat for a Japanese submarine, and dropped a 500-pound (227 kg) bomb. The explosion of the bomb lifted the boat into the air, badly damaging it but inflicting no serious injuries on its occupants. Uncertain of the dive bomber's identity, Meade opened fire on it, damaging it and driving it off but not harming its crew. The boat returned safely to Meade and the Dauntless landed safely aboard Suwannnee.

I-35′s three survivors said that they believed that I-35 had been in combat with two cruisers, that the cruisers had launched two floatplanes, and that the floatplanes had bombed the submarine, with one bomb striking the ammunition box for her 140-millimeter (5.5 in) deck gun.

Perhaps because of the proximity of the International Date Line to the Gilbert Islands, some sources place the events of 23 November 1943 — the date in the Gilbert Islands of the sinking of I-35 — on 22 November, the date in the waters of the Pacific Ocean on the other side of the line, not far west of the islands.

In ramming I-35, Frazier sustained serious bow damage, with the lower 4 feet (1.2 m) of her bow bent 3 feet (0.91 m) to port. Two days after the sinking of I-35, Frazier departed the Gilbert Islands area for repairs at Pearl Harbor.

On 10 January 1944, the Imperial Japanese Navy — unaware that the destroyers had rescued three survivors — declared I-35 to be presumed lost with all hands in the Gilbert Islands area. She was stricken from the Navy list on 10 April 1944.

== Sources ==
- Hackett, Bob & Kingsepp, Sander. IJN Submarine I-35: Tabular Record of Movement. Retrieved on August 26, 2020.
- McQuarrie, Peter (October 2023). "The Sinking of I-35: The Imperial Japanese Navy's Submarine I-35 Went Down During 'Operation Galvanic,' the American Seizure of Tarawa and Makin in the Gilbert Islands". WWII History. McLean, Virginia: Sovereign Media.
- Milanovich, Kathrin (2021). "The IJN Submarines of the I 15 Class". In Jordan, John (ed.). Warship 2021. Oxford, UK: Osprey Publishing. pp. 29–43. ISBN 978-1-4728-4779-9.
