= John Leamy (merchant) =

American merchant

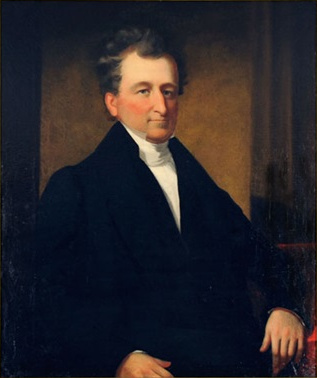
Portrait by Bass Otis

John Leamy (1757 – December 4, 1839) was an Irish-born American merchant who pioneered Philadelphia's trade with the Spanish colonies in the Americas. He was a founder of the Insurance Company of North America and the Hibernian Society. As an active Roman Catholic, he helped fund the construction of St. Augustine Church, was a trustee at St. Mary's and there participated in the Hogan schism.

== Early life ==
Leamy was born in Ireland in 1757 but educated in Spain, where he lived for several years; by 1781 he had moved to Philadelphia in the United States. He had established a business by October 27, 1785, when "John Leamy and Co., Merchants" appeared in the first Philadelphia City Directory.

== Business ==
Leamy became wealthy by venturing into the difficult trade with Spain when most merchants would not. When he lost his especially competitive position, trade stagnated, and he focused on domestic business thereafter.

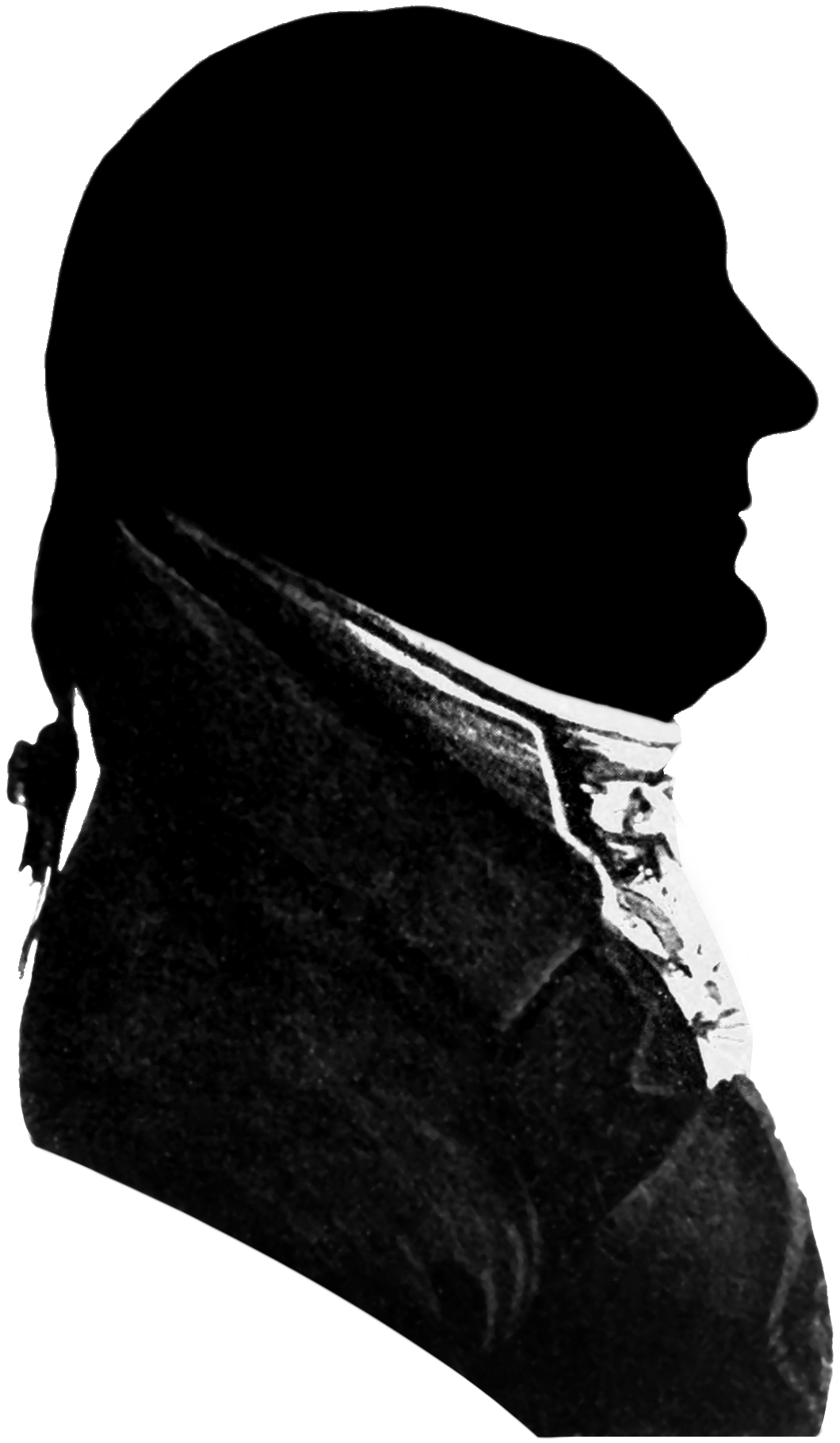
Silhouette in the History of the Friendly Sons of St. Patrick

=== Methods ===
In a time when Spanish mercantilist policy was the primary obstacle to trade, Leamy established relationships with Spanish officials to gain preferred access to trade licenses. Beginning during the Spanish involvement in the American Revolution, he performed personal favors, such as making deliveries for Francisco Rendón and providing a house for ambassador Josef de Jáudenes. He strengthened these bonds through shared Roman Catholicism and patronage of the City Tavern.

Merchants like Leamy "exhibited extreme flexibility in business dealings, including the willingness to ship provisions by indirect routes, to pay off corrupt bureaucrats, and even to transport slaves to gain admittance to ports that were officially closed." After 1792 he achieved a "commanding presence" in the Spanish trade, while "those who acted differently simply did not succeed."

Rather than competing with other North American merchants, he cooperated strongly with New Yorkers John and Thomas Stoughton. They were never formal partners, but Leamy acted as their insurance broker while the Stoughtons chartered and provisioned his ships. They worked together to exploit the opportunities offered by Spanish officials. As agent he used his brother James Leamy, who lived in Havana until his death in 1798, while other merchants suffered from using unreliable correspondents.

=== Expansion ===
In March 1788 an advertisement showed "Leamy and Elliot", but by December Leamy was in business on his own account. In the late 1780s Leamy traded with peninsular Spain, Spanish Louisiana, and the Spanish and French Caribbean. He was the first to advertise licorice in a Philadelphia newspaper, and in 1789 he was a very heavy advertiser of raw cotton imported from Cartagena in New Granada (modern-day Colombia); he may have been the first American to import goods from that area. The City Directory of 1791 lists him as "Agent for His Catholic Majesty", Charles IV of Spain, but it remains unclear what this entailed. By passing on secret information from peninsular Spain to the colonies, Leamy acted similarly to a consul, though he held no diplomatic title.

By 1793 he was more focused on peninsular Spain and Cuba. Primarily he exported flour, bringing on average 2,000 barrels per voyage to Cuba, and returning to the United States with gold and silver specie. He was responsible for transporting over $100,000 worth of specie from Havana to Philadelphia in 1794 alone. The volume of this trade was such that the Cuban economy regularly became drained of specie and suffered food shortages as a result.

After a temporary lifting of trade restrictions, on November 28, 1798, Leamy's frigate John arrived at Montevideo carrying lumber, becoming the first United States vessel to enter the Río de la Plata. It probably returned with wool, hides and beef.

Some of the ships Leamy owned or insured were captured in the Quasi-War, contributing to the French spoliation claims.

To reduce the risk of his operations Leamy helped found the Insurance Company of North America in 1792. He was a director and at first its best customer, with the company archives offering extensive evidence of his insured ventures, but he left it in late 1806 to found the Marine and Fire Insurance Company.

=== Decline ===
Compared to the early years of success, Leamy's business was stymied from 1802 to 1807, the time Valentín de Foronda spent as Spain's consul-general in Philadelphia. Foronda was much more interested than his predecessors in strict enforcement of Spanish law, at the expense of Leamy's trade. U.S.–Spanish trade was becoming more accessible, but after 1807 Leamy shifted toward domestic business, especially marine insurance.

== Civic activity ==
As an Irish emigrant himself, Leamy was one of the founding members of the Hibernian Society for the Relief of Emigrants from Ireland in 1790, and served on its acting committee. Two years later he was elected to membership in the Friendly Sons of St. Patrick, and in the same decade he was chosen to join the prestigious First City Troop. When the U.S. Supreme Court impaneled an expert jury of merchants in Georgia v. Brailsford (1794), he was on the list of prospective jurors.

He also used his merchant wealth to gain prominence in the Roman Catholic community, donating $200 to the original construction of St. Augustine Church in 1796—the largest individual contribution. Leamy was a pewholder and at one time president of the board of trustees at St. Mary's, where during the Hogan schism he chaired a committee of pro-Hogan trustees.

== Personal life ==
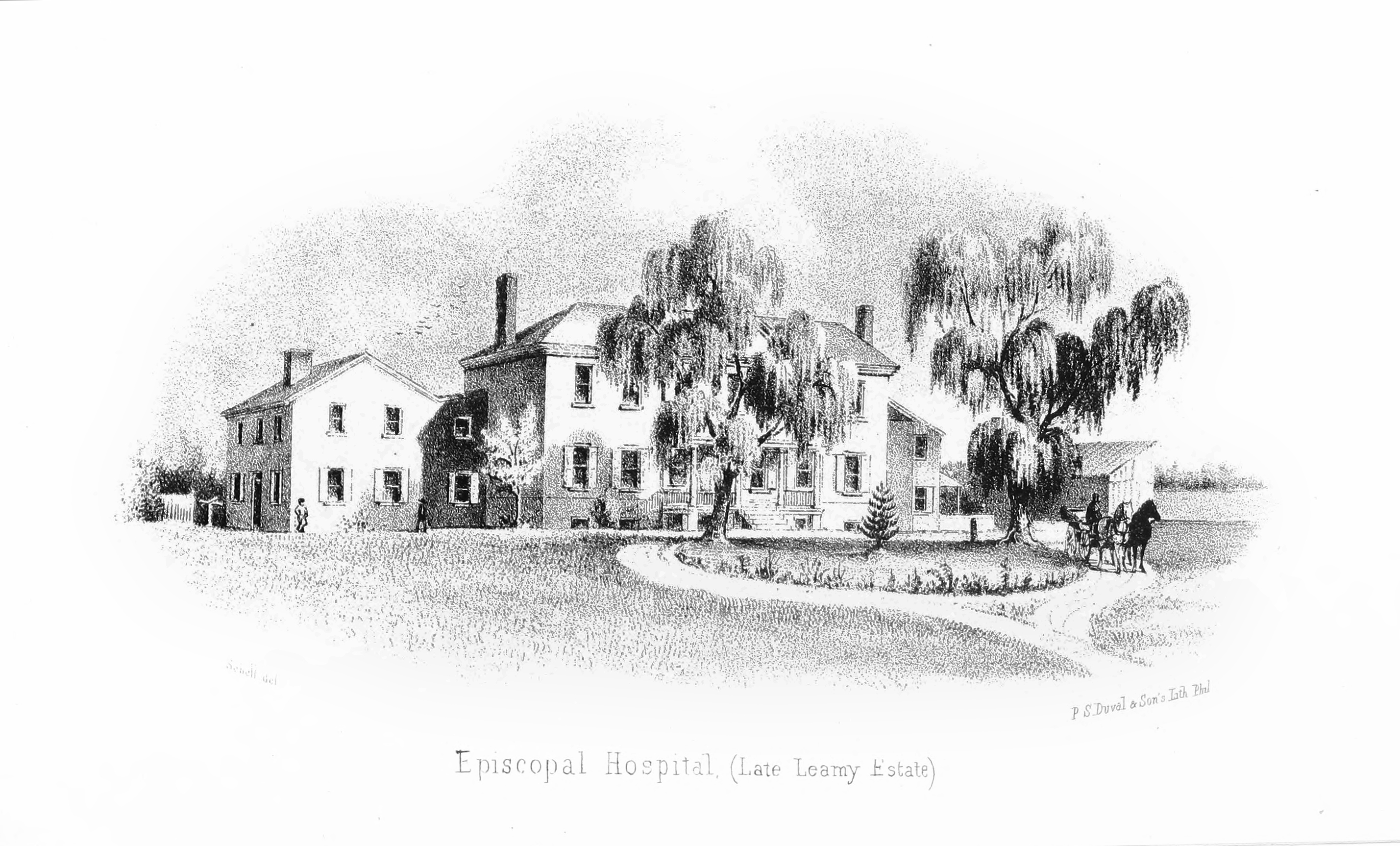
The Leamy mansion in use as the Episcopal Hospital, c. 1859

From baptismal records of St. Joseph's Church, Leamy's children include Mary (born September 21, 1792) with Mary Doyle, and then with his wife Elizabeth Doughty:

1. Margaret (born April 13, 1794)
2. John Anthony (June 13, 1796)
3. Louisa Mary (April 7, 1798)
4. Anna (August 22, 1800)
5. Elizabeth Harriet (June 24, 1802)

According to a Catholic history, "his children became Episcopalians ... and bitterly opposed to Catholicity."

Leamy built an estate at the corner of Front Street and Lehigh Avenue in Kensington, which he named Tusculum. After his death the Leamy children used it as a summer home until Ann and Elizabeth donated the land to help establish the Episcopal Hospital in 1852. The mansion did not house patients after 1863 and was eventually demolished to make room for purpose-built facilities. B Street bordering the campus was formerly called Leamy Street, and Tusculum Street still runs nearby.

== Death and legacy ==
John Leamy died on December 4, 1839, at age 82. While historian Charles Lyon Chandler wrote that two days later he was buried in the cemetery at St. Mary's, he is also recorded as being interred with his children at St. Paul's Episcopal Church. His will is preserved in the Philadelphia City Archives.

Chandler said in 1953 that Leamy had received "little attention" compared to his contemporary George Meade. In 2003, Linda K. Salvucci concluded that "he was the most prominent American trader with the Spanish Empire of his generation, but John Leamy's significance has eluded students of Philadelphia's postrevolutionary commerce." Records of his business are spread across archives in Spain, the United States and Cuba. The lack of a single collection of his business papers, and predominance in Spanish rather than American archives, may explain why he has been understudied.

== Bibliography ==
- Barratt, Norris Stanley (1917). Outline of the History of Old St. Paul's Church, Philadelphia, Pennsylvania. Colonial Society of Pennsylvania.
- Campbell, John H. (1892). History of the Friendly Sons of St. Patrick and of the Hibernian Society for the Relief of Emigrants from Ireland: March 17, 1771—March 17, 1892. Philadelphia: Hibernian Society.
- Chandler, Charles L. (July 1918). "The River Plate Voyages, 1798–1800". American Historical Review. 23 (4): 816–826. doi:10.2307/1836335.
- ——— (June 1953). "Catholic Merchants of Early Philadelphia". Records of the American Catholic Historical Society of Philadelphia. 64 (2): 94–103. JSTOR 44210305.
- "Church Builders, But Descendants Lost to the Church". American Catholic Historical Researches. New Series. 1 (4): 330. October 1905. JSTOR 44377711.
- Milano, Kenneth W. (2012). Hidden History of Kensington and Fishtown. Charleston, South Carolina: The History Press. ISBN 9781614236375.
- Morris, Elliston (1916). "Sketch of the History of the Episcopal Hospital". Medical and Surgical Reports of the Episcopal Hospital. 4: 24–35.
- Philadelphia Department of Streets (1959). Philadelphia Street Map.
- Reuss, Francis X. (September 1904). "Sacramental Registers at St. Joseph's Church, Philadelphia, Pa., of the Eighteenth Century. Fifth Series. Baptisms Administered by Fathers Keating, Fleming, Graessl and Marechal. From January to December, 1792". Records of the American Catholic Historical Society of Philadelphia. 15 (3): 289–313. JSTOR 44207897.
- ——— (March 1905). "Sacramental Registers at St. Joseph's Church, Philadelphia, Pa., of the Eighteenth Century. Fifth Series. Baptisms Administered by Fathers Neale, Keating, Cibot, Larroque, Elling and Ennis. From January to December, 1794". Records of the American Catholic Historical Society of Philadelphia. 16 (1): 53–68. JSTOR 44207920.
- ——— (September 1905). "Sacramental Registers at St. Joseph's Church, Philadelphia, Pa., of the Eighteenth Century. Fifth Series. Baptisms Administered by Fathers Ennis, Houdet, De Barth, Neale, Carr and Whelan. From January to December, 1796". Records of the American Catholic Historical Society of Philadelphia. 16 (3): 314–343. JSTOR 44207938.
- ——— (March 1906). "Sacramental Registers at St. Joseph's Church, Philadelphia, Pa., of the Eighteenth Century. Sixth Series. Baptisms Administered by Fathers Ennis, Carr, Neale, Houdet, Lagrange, Helbron and De Borniol. From January to December, 1798". Records of the American Catholic Historical Society of Philadelphia. 17 (1): 1–32. JSTOR 44207954.
- ——— (December 1906). "Sacramental Registers at St. Joseph's Church, Philadelphia, Pa., of the Eighteenth Century. Sixth Series. Baptisms Administered by Fathers Carr, Kersauson, De Kerjean, Rosseter, McMahon, Helbron, Brennan, O'Brien, Staunton and Stafford. January to December, 1800". Records of the American Catholic Historical Society of Philadelphia. 17 (4): 457–485. JSTOR 44208928.
- ——— (June 1907). "Sacramental Registers at St. Joseph's Church, Philadelphia, Pa., of the Nineteenth Century. Seventh Series. Baptisms Administered by Fathers Rosseter, Carr, Stafford, Lacy and Fitzpatrick. January to December, 1802". Records of the American Catholic Historical Society of Philadelphia. 18 (2): 216–239. JSTOR 44208013.
- Salvucci, Linda K. (1984). "Anglo-American Merchants and Stratagems for Success in Spanish Imperial Markets, 1783–1807". In Barbier, Jacques A.; Kuethe, Allan J. (eds.). The North American Role in the Spanish Imperial Economy. United Kingdom: Manchester University Press. pp. 127–133.
- ——— (1985). Development and Decline: The Port of Philadelphia and Spanish Imperial Markets, 1783-1823 (PhD dissertation). Princeton University.
- ——— (November 2003). "Merchants and Diplomats: Philadelphia's Early Trade with Cuba". Pennsylvania Legacies. 3 (2): 6–10.
- ——— (Winter 2005). "Atlantic Intersections: Early American Commerce and the Rise of the Spanish West Indies (Cuba)". Business History Review. 79 (4): 781–809. doi:10.2307/25097114. JSTOR 25097114. S2CID 154494237.
- Shelfer, Lochlan F. (October 2013). "Special Juries in the Supreme Court". Yale Law Journal. 123 (1): 208–252.
- Warren, Richard A. (October 2004). "Displaced 'Pan-Americans' and the Transformation of the Catholic Church of Philadelphia, 1789–1850". Pennsylvania Magazine of History and Biography. 128 (4): 343–366.
- Williams, Greg H. (October 21, 2009). The French Assault on American Shipping, 1793–1813: A History and Comprehensive Record of Merchant Marine Losses. Jefferson, North Carolina: McFarland & Company. ISBN 9780786454075.
