= 1799 St. Mary's Church riot =

Civil conflict in Philadelphia

1799 Irish Riot at St. Mary's Church
- Date: February 10, 1799
- Location: Philadelphia, Pennsylvania
- Caused by: Petitioners attempting to gain the support of churchgoers

Lead figures
Petitioners: James Reynolds; Samuel Cummings; Robert Moore; William Duane	Victim; James Gallagher

Casualties
- Death: 0
- Arrested: 4
- Charged: 1

On February 10, 1799, a riot was instigated by Dr. James Reynolds, an Irish Protestant who attempted to assault James Gallagher. The riot took place at St. Mary's Church in Philadelphia, Pennsylvania. Three other men, Robert Moore, Samuel Cummings, and William Duane were also involved and working with Reynolds. These men worked in conjunction with a committee attempting to repeal the Alien and Sedition Acts of 1798. The Alien Act was passed on June 22, 1798, and the Sedition Act was passed on July 14, 1798. Their goal was to garner the most support and signatures at the church to repeal the acts.

== Background ==
The Alien and Sedition Acts of 1798 caused further tensions within the Irish community. The Alien Act, more specifically, increased the risk of them being deported on suspicion of being a threat or treasonous to the United States. These acts declared that they were a potential threat, and were discriminatory in nature. This act also declared that the president of the United States had permission to judge who was a threat and "shall order to depart out of the United States."

On February 8, 1799, Reynolds, Moore, Cummings, and Duane participated in a committee to organize and repeal these acts. This group convened at a local tavern, where their goal was to compose a petition to aid the Irish immigrants. This committee decided to go to the local Presbyterian and Catholic churches to obtain signatures, since the people attending mass at those churches were largely affected by the acts.

== Events ==
Dr. Reynolds, Moore, Cummings, and Duane arrived at St. Mary's church on the morning of February 10 or 11th. According to the committee the four petitioners participated in, approximately 3/4ths of St. Mary's churchgoers were greatly affected by the acts, where they could potentially gather the most support. They also went to post the petition on the wall of the church. Prior to the start of mass, two church trustees told the men to leave the area, but came back during the service. James Gallagher also tore down the notice they had placed on the wall. When he had done this, Reynolds reprimanded him and called him an "impudent scoundrel." Gallagher replied "no Jacobin paper had a right to a place on the wall of that church." The Father of the church, Leonard Neale, had told Gallagher to "go to the pews of some of the influential members and tell them of the state of affairs, and ask them to prevent them."

The riot occurred after mass once the congregation of Irish Catholics started leaving the church. The three men, led by Dr. James Reynolds, attempted to gain the signatures of the churchgoers as the group walked out. They were able to obtain some of the signatures, yet there were other churchgoers who yelled insults and threats at the petitioners. This only grew the tensions on the church grounds. James Gallagher, the man who had torn down the notice prior to mass, was reprimanding Reynolds for not ceasing, and this led to Reynolds drawing out his pistol assault him. Another man named Lewis Ryan managed to apprehend Reynolds and take his pistol before he could shoot at Gallagher.

Once the dust had settled, Dr. Reynolds, Moore, Cummings, and Duane were arrested. Their bonds were set at $4,000 for each of them.

== Aftermath ==
On the morning of February 20 or 21, 1799, James Reynolds was put on trial on the question of whether or not he assaulted James Gallagher. Twelve jurors were present in this court case, which was held at the Philadelphia Court of Oyer and Terminer. Moore, Cummings, and Duane were also put on trial for their involvement.

During the trial, Father Leonard Neale of St. Mary's church testified against the four petitioners, saying that it was an insult to the congregation and the church to post the petition on their walls. Reverend Matthew Carr of St. Augustine testified in favor of the petitioners, saying that it was a typical strategy to obtain petitions at the local churches. Another Father named Father Carr testified at the trial, and made the claim that political meetings after a church service were a common occurrence in Ireland. Alexander James Dallas, who was a part of the defense council, backed up Father Carr's statement, saying that that strategy was also present in the United States. Countering that, Joseph Hopkinson, who was part of the prosecution council, claimed that "aliens [had] no right whatsoever to petition, or to interfere in any respect with the government of this country."

After the 30 minute trial, the jury later acquitted Moore, Cummings, and Duane. Reynolds, however, was declared guilty for "assault and battery upon Gallagher."
