= USS Meade =

USS Meade may refer to the following ships of the United States Navy:

- USS Meade (DD-274), a Clemson-class destroyer commissioned in 1919; transferred to the Royal Navy as HMS Ramsey (G60), 1940
- USS Meade (DD-602), a Benson-class destroyer commissioned in 1942 and decommissioned in 1946.
