= Dancing Assemblies of Philadelphia =

The Dancing Assemblies of Philadelphia are assemblies in Philadelphia that include subscribers who pay a fee to pay for facilities and refreshments in order to meet on scheduled nights to dance, play cards, and discuss politics.

Such assemblies took place in several countries, such as England and its colonies, but they became especially prevalent in the New World colonies. Philadelphia formed one of the first such forms of social gathering in 1749.

== History ==
The Philadelphia Dancing Assembly was regularly attended by Benjamin Franklin, George Washington, and other prominent figures of the time.
