= St. Mary's Roman Catholic Church (Philadelphia) =

Coordinates: 39.94563°N 75.14838°W

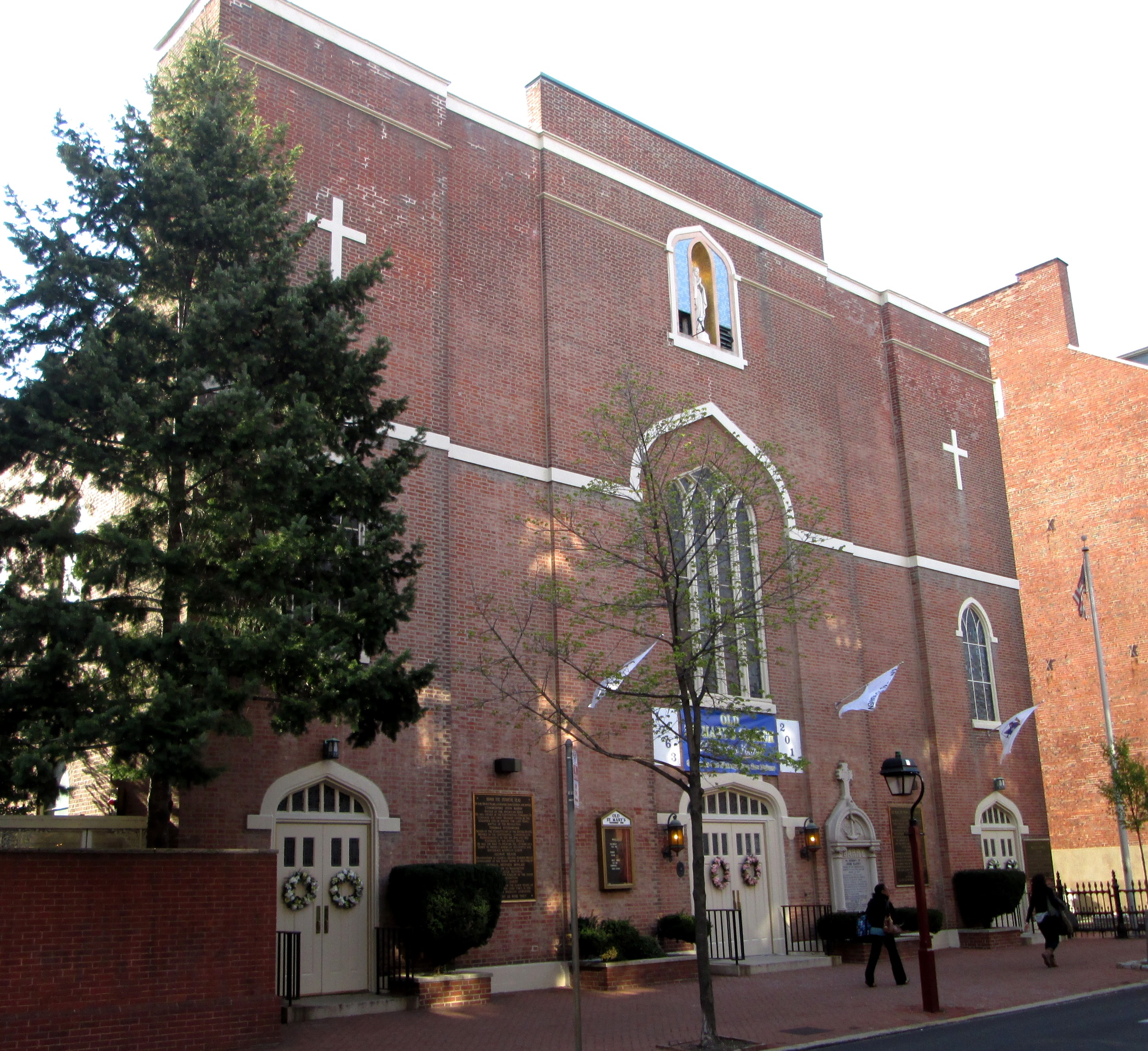
- St. Mary's Roman Catholic Church in Philadelphia
- St. Mary's Roman Catholic Church
- Location: 252 S. 4th Street; Philadelphia, Pennsylvania, U.S.
- Denomination: Catholic Church
- Website: https://oldstmary.com/st-mary-cemetary/

History
- Status: Parish church, former cathedral
- Founded: 1763

Administration
- Diocese: Roman Catholic Archdiocese of Philadelphia

St. Mary's Roman Catholic Church, also known as Old St. Mary's, is a historic church in Philadelphia, Pennsylvania. It is located in the Society Hill neighborhood at 248 S. Fourth Street between Spruce and Walnut Streets.

Commonly referred to as "Old Saint Mary's", it opened in 1763 and was the second Catholic church in Philadelphia, after Old Saint Joseph's. It is still an active parish of the Archdiocese of Philadelphia, with Masses held on Saturdays at 4:30 p.m. and Sunday at 10 a.m. The current pastor is Paul A. DiGirolamo, J.C.D. The church is twinned with Holy Trinity Church at 6th and Spruce Streets, which serves as a worship site of St. Mary and which has Masses on holy days at 12 noon.

== History ==
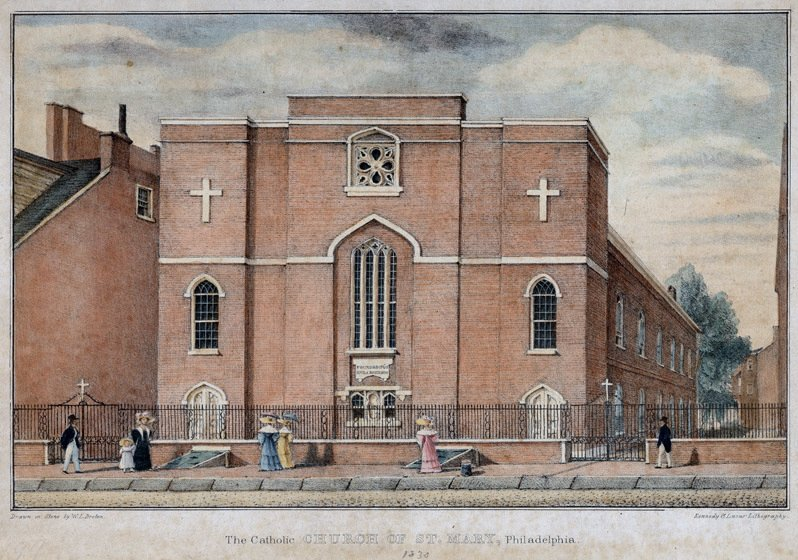
An 1829 lithograph of St. Mary's

Old Saint Mary's was established as a more spacious worship site for Old Saint Joseph's, a block away. Old Saint Joseph's had started as a chapel in a residence because public celebration of Catholic Mass was illegal at the time. In 1757, a larger church was built on the site of Old Saint Joseph's in Willings Alley; but six years later, Old St. Mary's was erected on a site which included room for a Catholic cemetery. St. Mary's and Old St. Joseph's remained a single parish until 1830. It was at St. Mary's, in 1782, that the first parish school connected to a Catholic church in America was opened. An interparochial school remains connected with the parish to this day.

Members of the Continental Congress and other public figures attended services on occasion at the church since it was the city's most prominent Catholic church at the time. Among them were George Washington and John Adams, who observed that the visual and musical splendor of the church encompassed "everything that can lay hold of eye, ear, and imagination, everywhere which can charm and bewitch the simple and ignorant," adding, "I wonder how Luther ever broke the spell."

In 1810, after Philadelphia had been made a diocese, St. Mary's was named the cathedral, a role in which it continued until 1838, when St. John the Evangelist Church superseded it.

Under the first three bishops of the diocese, the trustees of St. Mary's were frequently at odds with the bishops; the disputes finally culminated in the temporary closure of the church in 1831 by Bishop Francis Patrick Kenrick, after which the disputes finally subsided.

== Interior and architecture ==
The church was renovated in 1963, but many of the earlier features were retained, including an 18th-century baptismal font and the cathedra of Bishop Henry Conwell from 1820, when the church served as the diocesan cathedral. Chandeliers that were originally installed in Independence Hall have also been kept in the renovated building.

The façade is of brick in the Gothic style and the interior of the church features a balcony and choir loft, which extends around three sides of the building, to either side of the altar in the front. Above the main door, on the exterior wall, in an alcove, is a statue of Mary, after whom the parish is named. The ceiling features a fresco of Mary's Assumption and stained glass windows, some reaching a height of two stories. The original architect of the church was Charles Johnson.

== Education ==
The church's designated parochial grade school is St. Mary Interparochial Grade School.

== Cemetery ==
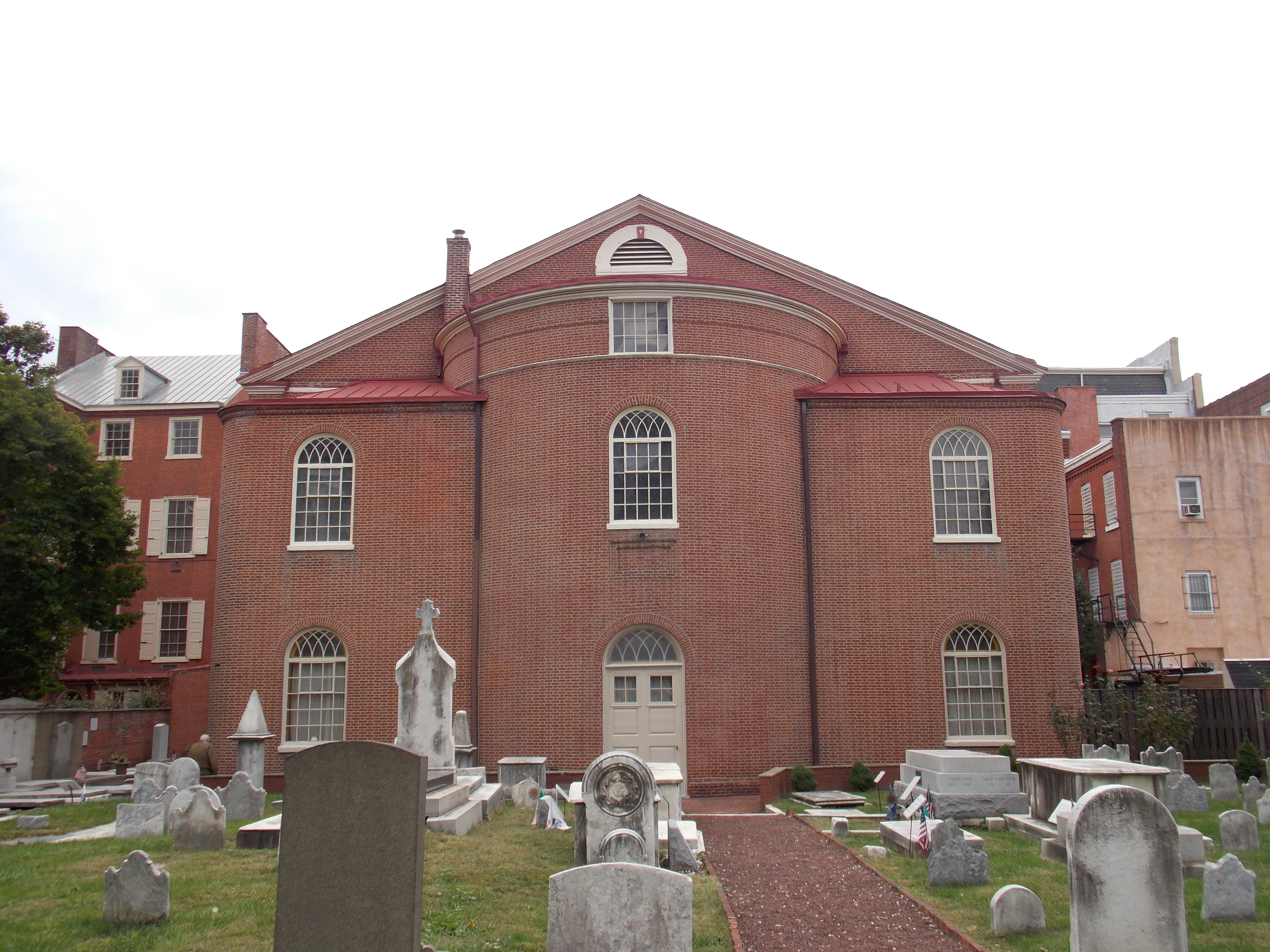
The churchyard cemetery behind the church

The churchyard dates from 1759. Its cemetery was enlarged by adding an extra layer of soil to the ground level following the Yellow Fever Epidemic of 1793.

=== Notable interments ===
- Commodore John Barry (1745–1803), father of the US Navy
- Michael Bouvier (1792–1874), cabinetmaker and great-great-grandfather of Jacqueline Kennedy Onassis
- James Campbell (1812–1893), Postmaster General of the United States
- Jean Joseph de Barth (1726–1793), Alsatian counselor to King Louis XVI who led refugees from the French Revolution to the United States
- Mathew Carey (1760–1839), publisher and pamphleteer
- Thomas Fitzsimons (1741–1811), delegated to the Continental Congress
- George Meade (1741–1808), merchant and grandfather of General George Gordon Meade
- Richard Worsam Meade I (1778–1828), merchant and father of General Meade
- Richard Worsam Meade II (1807–1870), US Navy captain
- Stephen Moylan (1737–1811), military commander in the American Revolutionary War
- Manuel Torres (1762–1822), first ambassador of Colombia to the United States
- Philippe Charles Tronson du Coudray (1738–1777), French army officer who volunteered his services to the Continental Army

== See also ==
- List of cathedrals in the United States
- List of Catholic cathedrals in the United States
- 1799 St. Mary's Church riot
