= Japanese ship Wakaba =

At least three warships of Japan have borne the name Wakaba:

- Japanese destroyer Wakaba (1905), a Kamikaze-class destroyer launched in 1905 and scrapped in 1929
- Japanese destroyer Wakaba (1934), a Hatsuharu-class destroyer launched in 1934 and sunk in 1944
- JDS Wakaba (DE-261), the former Tachibana-class destroyer Nashi that was both launched and sunk in 1945. She was salvaged and renamed in 1955 serving until stricken in 1971
