= Robert Leamy Meade =

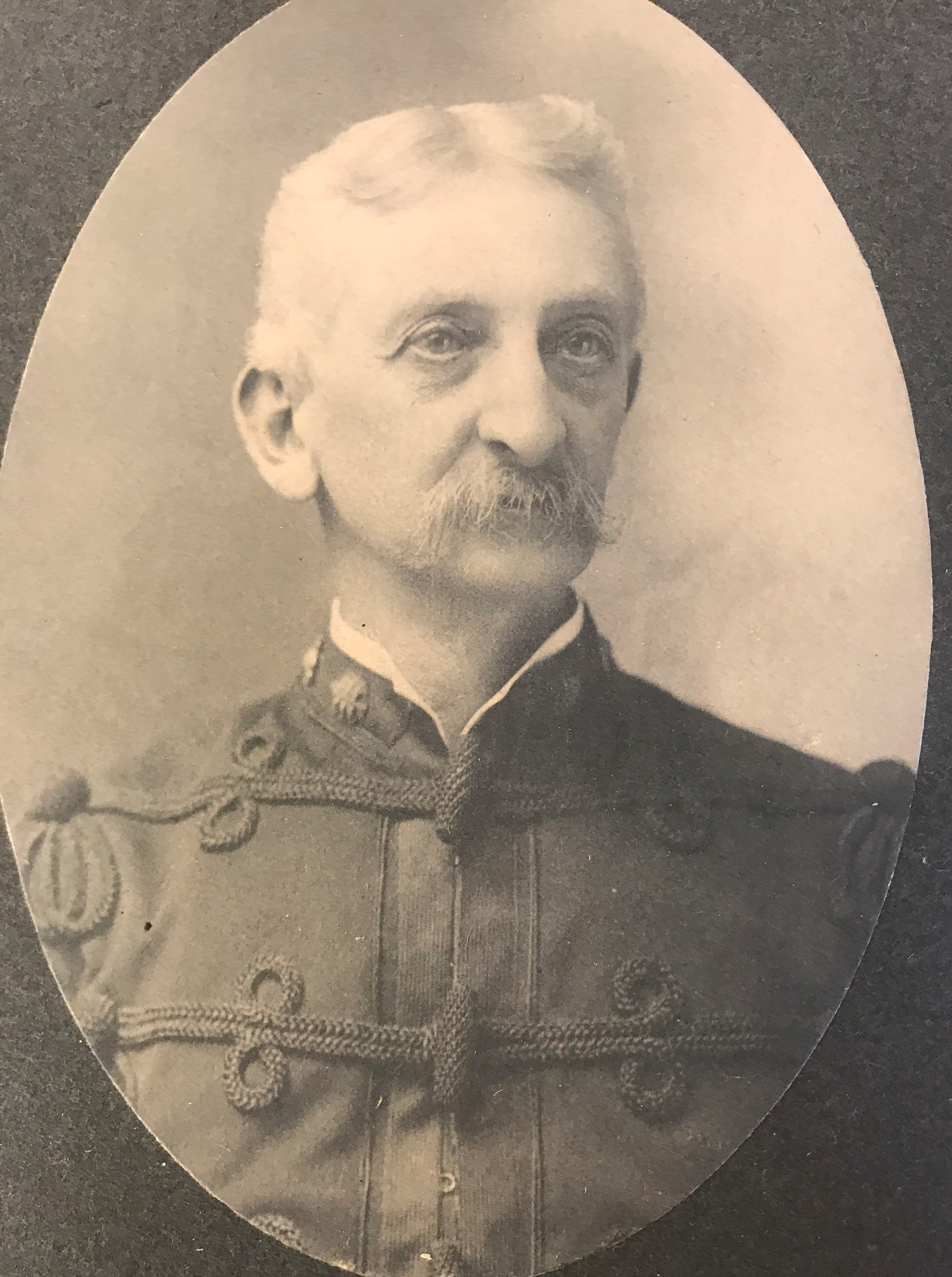
- Born: December 25, 1842; Washington, D.C., U.S.
- Died: February 11, 1910 (aged 67); Lexington, Massachusetts, U.S.
- Relatives: Richard Worsam Meade II (father); George Meade (uncle); Richard Worsam Meade III (brother)
- Military career
- Allegiance: United States of America
- Branch: United States Marine Corps
- Service years: 1862–1906
- Rank: Colonel; Brevet Brigadier General
- Conflicts: American Civil War; Spanish–American War; Boxer Rebellion

Robert Leamy Meade (December 25, 1842 – February 11, 1910) was an officer in the United States Marine Corps during the American Civil War, Spanish–American War and Boxer Rebellion. He was the nephew of Major General George G. Meade.

== Early life and career ==
Meade was born in Washington, D.C., the son of Richard Worsam Meade II, an officer in the United States Navy. He was commissioned as a second lieutenant in the Marine Corps on June 14, 1862, and commanded a battalion of marines during the suppression of the New York City draft riots in July 1863. He took part in the daring boat attack against Fort Sumter on September 8, 1863, and was later brevetted for gallant and meritorious service. During the raid, he was captured by Confederate soldiers defending the fort, and he spent the remainder of the war as a prisoner of the Confederacy.

Between the Civil War and the Spanish–American War, Meade served in a variety of billets at shore and aboard ships. In the early 1870s, he commanded the Marine detachment aboard the first U.S. warship to visit Cochin-China (now Vietnam) with the mission of deterring pirates from attacking American shipping in the area. He also served as Commanding Officer of the Marine Barracks at the New York Navy Yard and the Boston Navy Yard. While at the Boston Navy Yard, Lieutenant Colonel Meade made an enemy of Assistant Secretary of the Navy Theodore Roosevelt, by refusing to award a construction contract to a firm recommended by Roosevelt.

== Later career ==
During the Spanish–American War he served as fleet Marine officer on the cruiser USS New York and participated in the Battle of Santiago de Cuba. Victor Maria Concas y Palau, captain of the cruiser Infanta Maria Teresa at the battle of Santiago, described the poor attitude of Meade to the Spanish prisoners at Portsmouth. He claimed that Meade's attitude was responsible of the death of several sailors, as he did not allow them to have the adequate medical help, and that he also had a lack of respect for Spanish officers.

Immediately after the Spanish–American War, Meade was sent to the Philippines as part of a Marine detachment intended to counter the rising tensions between Filipino Muslim rebels and the government. Shortly after arriving in the Philippines, he was promoted to colonel on March 3, 1899, and was sent to China during the Boxer Rebellion. He was the senior American officer during the events leading up to the Battle of Tientsin, but he was medically evacuated before the actual battle occurred. For distinguished conduct and public service, he was appointed brigadier general, by brevet, on July 13, 1900.

When Major General Charles Heywood retired as Commandant of the Marine Corps in 1903, Brigadier General Meade was the longest serving Marine officer then on active duty, and he believed he was next in line to be General Heywood's replacement. President Theodore Roosevelt, undoubtedly remembering the insubordination of Major Meade in the affair involving a construction contract at the Boston Navy Yard, instead appointed Colonel George F. Elliott to be the new Commandant. Robert Leamy Meade retired from the Marine Corps on June 29, 1906 after 43 years of service and having taken part in every major military action that took place from the Civil War through the Boxer Rebellion.

He was a member of the Military Order of the Loyal Legion of the United States and the Military Order of Foreign Wars.

General Meade died at Lexington, Massachusetts, on February 11, 1910. He is buried in Huntington Rural Cemetery in Huntington, New York.

== Awards ==
- Sampson Medal
- Civil War Campaign Medal
- Spanish Campaign Medal
- Philippine Campaign Medal
- China Relief Expedition Medal

== Namesake ==
Two ships have been named USS Meade for him and his brother, Richard Worsam Meade III. The sons of Richard Worsam Meade II, they were nephews of General George Gordon Meade.
