= James Gay Gordon =

American judge

James Gay Gordon (1855-1937) was a judge and bar member in Pennsylvania. He died of a heart attack on March 31st 1937.
