= Richard Worsam Meade II =

US Navy officer

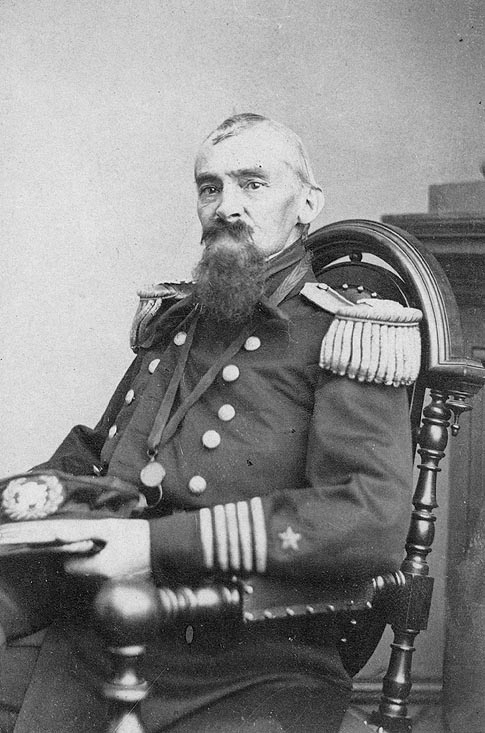
- R. W. Meade as a captain.
- Born: 21 May 1807; Cádiz, Spain
- Died: 16 April 1870 (aged 62); Brooklyn, New York
- Burial place: St. Mary's Roman Catholic Church, Philadelphia, Pennsylvania
- Military career
- Allegiance: United States; Union
- Branch: United States Navy; Union Navy
- Service years: 1826–1851; 1854–1855; 1861–1867
- Rank: Captain
- Commands: USS Massachusetts; USS North Carolina; USS San Jacinto
- Conflicts: Mexican-American War; American Civil War

Captain Richard Worsam Meade II (21 May 1807 – 16 April 1870) was an American naval officer. He was also called Richard Worsam Meade, Sr. to distinguish him from his son, Rear Admiral Richard Worsam Meade III.

== Life and career ==
Meade was born in Cádiz, Spain, on 21 May 1807, to American parents, Richard Worsam Meade I and his wife Margaret Coats Butler Meade.

Meade entered the United States Navy as a midshipman in April 1826, appointed from the Commonwealth of Pennsylvania. During the next decade he served on a number of ships, among them the frigate USS Brandywine during the later 1820s and early 1830s and the sloop-of-war USS St. Louis in the mid-1830s. He was promoted to lieutenant in December 1837 and subsequently was assigned to the United States Coast Survey, the New York Navy Yard, the steamer USS Fulton, and the store ship USS Erie.

Meade's U.S. Navy service became intermittent in the mid-1840s, with a long period of "waiting orders" broken in 1847 by assignment to the steamer USS Scourge. Meade resigned his commission in December 1851, but was again in U.S. Navy service in 1854–1855 as commanding officer of the steamer USS Massachusetts in the Pacific Squadron. He once more left the Navy in September 1855.

After the American Civil War broke out in April 1861, Meade returned to active duty in the U.S. Navy with the rank of commander, apparently backdated to September 1855. He commanded the receiving ship USS North Carolina (an old ship-of-the-line) at New York City until 1864. Promoted to captain in 1864, with the date of rank again apparently backdated, this time to July 1862, he was commanding officer of the steam frigate USS San Jacinto until she was wrecked in the Bahamas on 1 January 1865.

The war ended in April 1865. After the war, Meade became a member of the Military Order of the Loyal Legion of the United States.

Meade appears to have had no further active employment. He was retired in December 1867 and died at Brooklyn, New York, on 16 April 1870. He is buried in Philadelphia at St. Mary's Roman Catholic Church with his wife and several relatives.

== Family ==
Meade's younger brother was Major General George Gordon Meade, the victor of the Battle of Gettysburg during the American Civil War, and he was the father of Rear Admiral Richard Worsam Meade III.
