= Richard Worsam Meade III =

United States Civil War admiral

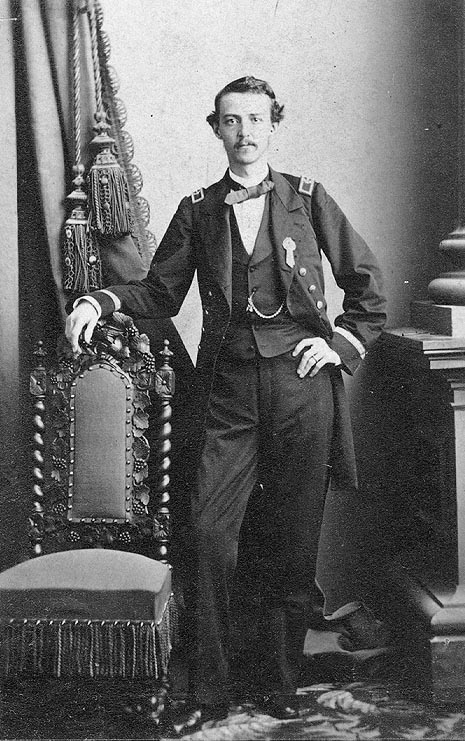
- Lieutenant Richard W. Meade III, circa 1862
- Born: October 9, 1837; New York City, US
- Died: May 4, 1897 (aged 59); Washington, D.C., US
- Burial place: Arlington National Cemetery
- Relatives: Richard Worsam Meade II (father); George Gordon Meade (uncle)
- Military career
- Allegiance: United States of America
- Branch: United States Navy
- Service years: 1856–1895
- Rank: Rear admiral
- Commands: USS Louisville; USS Marblehead; USS Chocura; USS Saginaw; USS Narragansett; USS Vandalia; USS Dolphin; USS United States; North Atlantic Squadron
- Conflicts: American Civil War

Richard Worsam Meade III (also called Richard Worsam Meade, Jr., by many sources) (October 9, 1837 – May 4, 1897) was an officer in the United States Navy during the American Civil War.

== Biography ==
Born in New York City, he was the son of Captain Richard Worsam Meade II, USN, and followed his father by entering the Navy on October 2, 1850.

He was attached to the steam frigate San Jacinto of the Mediterranean Squadron in 1851–1854, and the sailing frigate Columbia in the Home Squadron in 1854–1855, before attending the United States Naval Academy in 1856. He was promoted to passed midshipman on June 20, 1856. He served in the steam frigate Merrimack in 1856–1857, and off Africa in 1857–1859 on board the corvette Cumberland and the sloop of war Dale. Promoted to Lieutenant on January 23, 1858, Meade was an officer of the steamer Saranac and sailing sloop of war Cyane, both units of the Pacific Squadron, during 1859–1861.

After returning to the East Coast from the Pacific in mid-1861, Lieutenant Meade was hospitalized for a few months for a tropical illness, then provided gunnery instruction to volunteer officers as the Navy expanded to meet the challenges of the American Civil War. In January 1862 he became executive officer of the steam sloop Dacotah and later held the same position on the new gunboat Conemaugh.

Promoted to Lieutenant-Commander on July 16, 1862, Meade's subsequent Civil War service was distinguished, including participation in the suppression of the July 1863 New York Draft Riots, plus active combat and blockade enforcement work while commanding the Mississippi River ironclad Louisville in the latter part of 1862 and the gunboats Marblehead in South Carolina waters in 1863–1864 and Chocura in the Gulf of Mexico during 1864–1865.

Meade's post-Civil War career marked him as one of the Navy's most prominent reformist and technologically minded officers. Duty at the Naval Academy in 1865–1868 was followed by promotion to Commander and service along the Alaskan coast as commanding officer of the steamer Saginaw. In 1871–1873 he took Narragansett on a lengthy diplomatic and information-gathering cruise through the south Pacific. During the rest of the 1870s he served ashore at Washington, D.C., and New York. He attained the rank of Captain while commanding Vandalia in the North Atlantic and West Indies in 1879–1882, then had additional shore duty and commanded the new dispatch vessel Dolphin. Captain Meade was Commandant of the Washington Navy Yard in 1887–1890. Promoted to Commodore in 1892 and Rear Admiral two years later, his final service was as commander of the North Atlantic Squadron in 1894–1895.

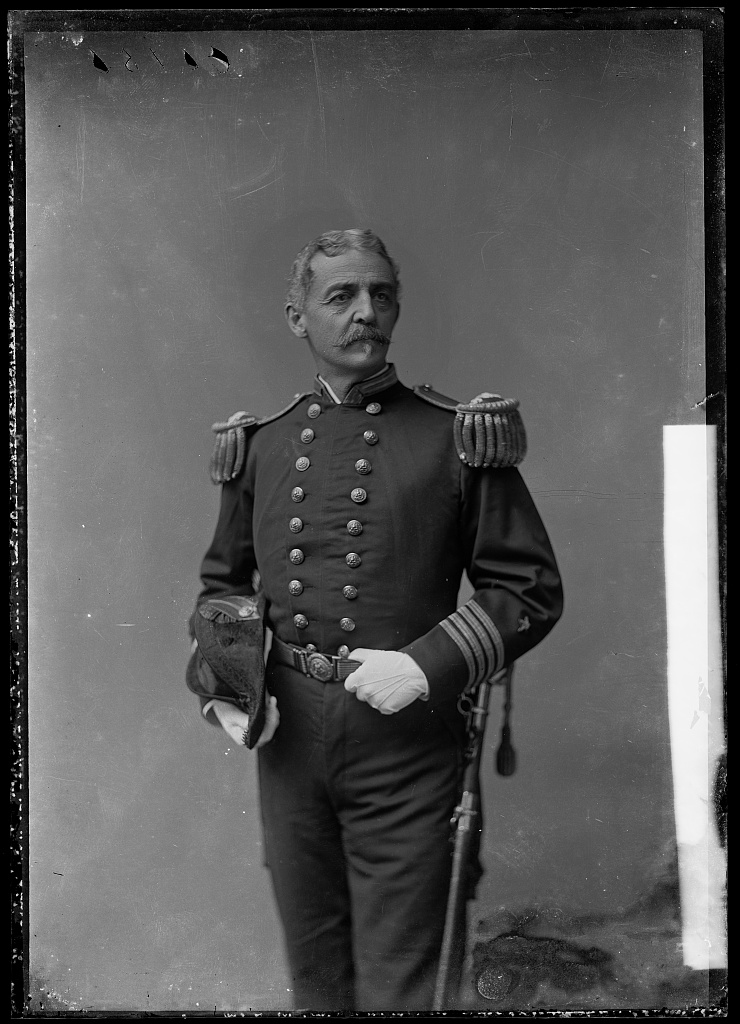
Capt. Meade later in life

His 1891 article "George Meade, a Patriot of the Revolutionary Era", was a "hagiographic account" that strongly influenced the reputation of his great-grandfather. He was a member of the Military Order of the Loyal Legion of the United States, the Society of Colonial Wars, the Order of Founders and Patriots of America and the Military Order of Foreign Wars.

Meade's early retirement in May 1895 followed a series of disagreements with the Navy Department. His obituary in the Indianapolis News reported Meade as criticizing President Grover Cleveland, and quoted the sentence "I am an American and a Union man, two things this administration can't stand."

Rear Admiral Meade died in Washington, D.C., on May 4, 1897 after complications following an operation for appendicitis. He is buried in Arlington National Cemetery alongside his brother, Lieutenant Commander Henry Meigs Meade, USN.

His wife, Rebecca Paulding, was the daughter of Rear Admiral Hiram Paulding.

"A Winter Voyage Through the Straights of Magellan"
by Richard Worsam Meade
Read by Availle for LibriVox
Audio 00:36:38 (full text)

== Namesakes ==
Two ships have been named USS Meade for him and his brother, Brigadier General Robert Leamy Meade, USMC. They were nephews of General George Gordon Meade.

Military offices
Preceded by Andrew E. K. Benham	Commander-in-Chief, North Atlantic Squadron; April 1894–May 1895	Succeeded by Francis M. Bunce
