= The Forgotten Man =

The Forgotten Man or forgotten men, may refer to:

- Forgotten man, a concept used in American political rhetoric
- The Forgotten Man (painting), a 2010 painting by Jon McNaughton
- The Forgotten Man: A New History of the Great Depression, a 2007 book by Amity Shlaes
- The Forgotten Man (novel), a 2005 Elvis Cole novel by Robert Crais
- The Forgotten Man (1941 film), a 1941 Robert Benchley short
- The Forgotten Man (1971 film), a 1971 TV film
- The Forgotten Man, and Other Essays, a collection of essays by William Graham Sumner
- Forgotten Man (album), a 1981 album by jazz saxophonist Lou Donaldson
- Forgotten Men, 1944 Australian radio serial programme
- The "Forgotten Man", a character from Deltarune
