= José M. Salazar =

Gran Colombian ambassador to US

José M. Salazar was the second ambassador from Gran Colombia to the United States. He was appointed in September 1822 following the death of Manuel Torres.
