= Charles Lyon Chandler =

American diplomat & historian (1883–1962)

- Born: December 29, 1883
- Died: June 29, 1962 (aged 78); Ridley Park, Pennsylvania, U.S.
- Education: Harvard College
- Occupation: Historian
- Writing career
- Genre: Non-fiction

Charles Lyon Chandler (December 29, 1883 – June 29, 1962) was an American consul and historian of Latin America–United States relations. A Harvard graduate who came to South America in the Consular Service, he became a student and proponent of Pan-Americanism. His pioneering 1915 book Inter-American Acquaintances proposed a new, Pan-American origin for the Monroe Doctrine. After being denied a permanent diplomatic appointment he worked for the Southern Railway and the Corn Exchange Bank; at the same time he became a respected independent scholar who helped found the Hispanic American Historical Review. Beside many articles on early inter-American relations, he co-authored an unpublished biography of Joel Roberts Poinsett. During World War II he worked in Brazil for the U.S. government, and before retirement he taught at Haverford, Georgetown and Ursinus.

For his scholarship and promotion of good relations based on shared cultural values, Chandler achieved significant honors in several South American countries—but not in the United States. This, combined with scant attention to his scholarship, led his biographer to characterize him as a forgotten man.

== Early life ==
Chandler was born in a Unitarian family, and would attribute a great influence to religious values of social progress and "perfect mutual toleration". His aunt Agnes Blake Poor encouraged a love of Spanish and Portuguese, while he took Latin and French in high school and studied German on his own. At Harvard College he focused on history and political science, studying under Frederick Jackson Turner, Edward Channing and Archibald Cary Coolidge before graduating magna cum laude in 1905.

== Consular service ==
Already in Europe on a George W. Dillaway fellowship, Chandler obtained a job in the United States Consular Service as the secretary of the American envoy in Portugal, Charles Page Bryan. The State Department sent him to Japan, where he studied interpreting, and then to Formosa and Manchuria as vice consul. In 1908 he was sent to Montevideo, Uruguay—the beginning of his Latin American experience.

Chandler wrote diverse reports for trade publications, such as arguing for American entrepreneurs to invest in Argentina rather than Japan or China. He was also returned to the United States to attend business conferences. Studying private international law at the University of Buenos Aires (after transferring to that consulate), he earned a certificate, and used university club life to interest Argentines in studying in the United States. He was the first foreign member of the university's Law Student's Club, and was active in the United States Universities Club of Buenos Aires as well as the Harvard Club of the River Plate.

In August 1911, he began writing Inter-American Acquaintances. The first chapter appeared the next month and the completed book in 1915 (Sewanee, Tennessee: University Press), with a second edition in 1917. Predating other early works on Pan-American relations, his biographer asserts that "Chandler's publications must be considered precursors to the pioneers". According to a contemporary review:

Of especial interest and consequence is the account presented of the origin of the Monroe Doctrine, because it is from an entirely fresh point of view, showing that it was Pan-American in its birth and that it was as much desired and as heartily welcomed by the South American peoples as by those of the United States.

In August 1911, Chandler was transferred to Callao, Peru, to serve as vice and deputy consul. The newspaper El Diario reported that "Chandler is a true American, inasmuch as he truly reflects reality; he is very much a latino in his fine projects and in his ideas and conceptions." He was elected to Lima's National Club, founded a United States Universities Club of Peru and enrolled at the University of San Marcos. In January 1914, however, the State Department informed him that he failed the entrance examination for permanent appointment to the Diplomatic Service.

== Later career ==
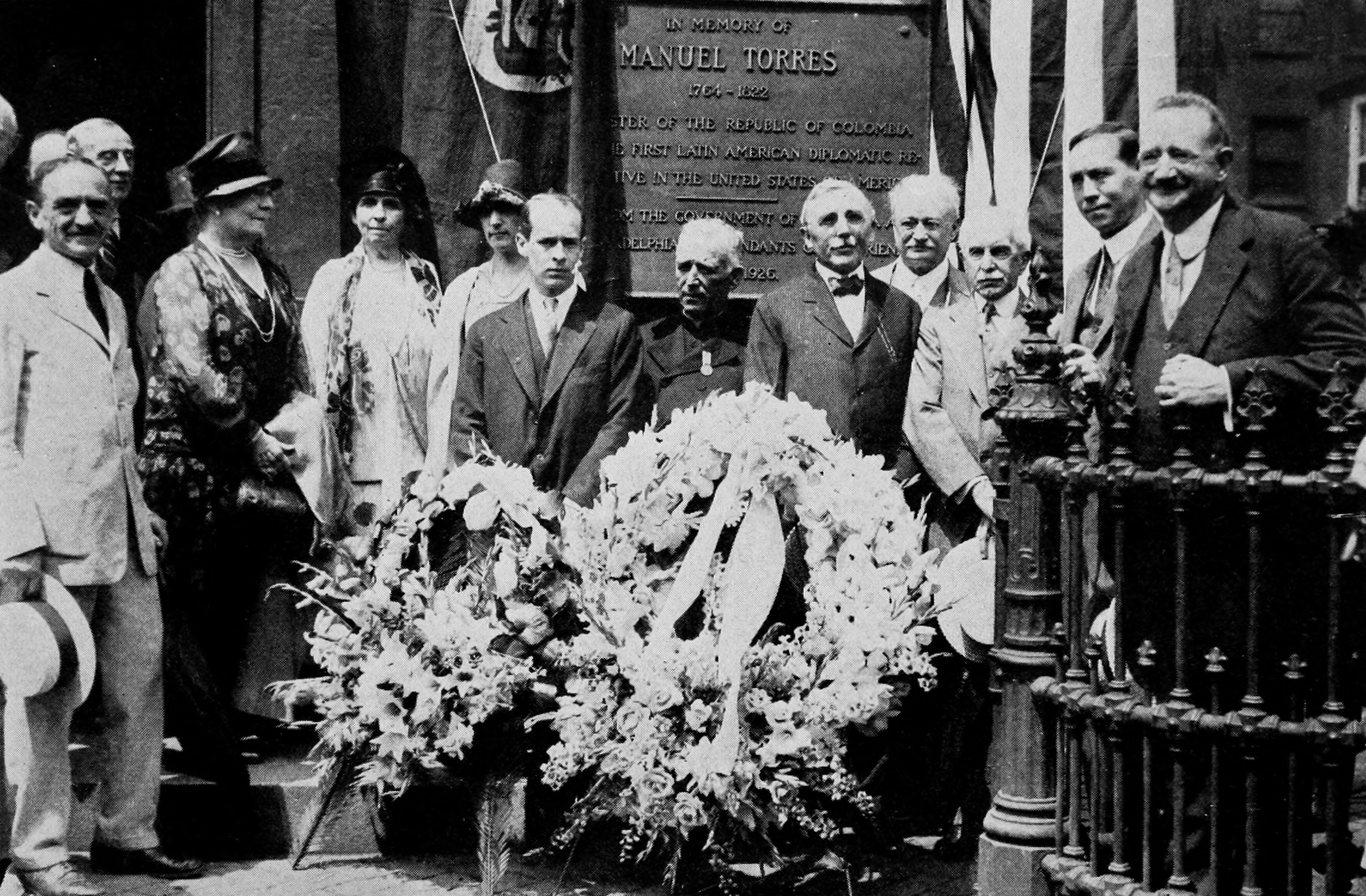
Ceremony for a plaque at Manuel Torres' grave site; Chandler first from right.

Leaving diplomacy, Chandler sustained himself with business jobs instead, working as an agent for the Southern Railway from 1914 to 1918, and as foreign trade manager for the Corn Exchange Bank of Philadelphia from 1918 to 1942. He continued lecturing, organizing tours and publishing scholarly articles related to inter-American affairs. He helped organize and fund the Hispanic American Historical Review, and wrote some of its first articles. In 1924 he discovered the tomb of the first Colombian ambassador to the United States, Manuel Torres, in Philadelphia.

During 1933 and 1934 he worked with Edwin J. Pratt on a biography of Joel Roberts Poinsett, intended for publication the next year. This "most important historical effort of his career" was upset, however, when J. Fred Rippy and Herbert E. Putnam both published Poinsett biographies that year. While Chandler sharply criticized these books in the Pennsylvania Magazine of History and Biography, stressing that "neither can be considered a definitive and final biography", it did not prevent his own work from being rejected by Princeton's and Harvard's university presses. The manuscript was revised but never published.

Following a switch to the Democratic Party in the 1920s, Chandler became a supporter of Franklin Roosevelt in the 1930s, exchanging some personal letters with the president. When the United States entered World War II, Chandler left banking for a job with the government's Rubber Development Corporation. He worked in Washington as well as Brazil, and in September 1943 moved to the Office of the Coordinator of Inter-American Affairs in Rio de Janeiro. He discovered the tomb of early American diplomat William Tudor there, and was popular in the Brazilian press.

Returning from Brazil at age 63, he spent six years teaching at Haverford College, Georgetown University and Ursinus College. At Ursinus he taught political science and helped obtain the Huntington Wilson Papers. In retirement he lived in Swarthmore, Pennsylvania, and taught at a Unitarian Sunday school, preached, and was unofficially involved with the Williams Foundation, an organization dedicated to interchange between the U.S. and Argentina.

== Death and legacy ==
Chandler died in Ridley Park, Pennsylvania, on June 29, 1962. His wife donated his papers to the University of North Carolina at Chapel Hill.

"Almost everything he wrote or spoke about seemed to show, in some way, that peoples of the Western Hemisphere could and did get along together under certain circumstances," Chandler's biographer Sheldon Avenius wrote. While Chandler was honored in South America, and witnessed an actual improvement in inter-American relations, the United States had little interest in Chandler's advocacy based on shared cultural values—leading Avenius to conclude that Chandler "remains today a splendid example of the forgotten man".

== Awards and honors ==
- 1926: Colombia – honorary doctor of laws
- 1934: Chile – Order of Merit
- 1944: Brazil – Commander in the Order of the Southern Cross
- 1944: Brazil – honorary doctor of letters from the University of Porto Alegre
- 1945: Brazil – commemorative medal for the centennial of the Baron of Rio Branco
- Colombia – elected to Academy of History
- Colombia – Order of Boyacá

== Bibliography ==
- Avenius, Sheldon H. Jr. (April 1967). "Charles Lyon Chandler: A Forgotten Man of Inter-American Cultural Relations". Journal of Inter-American Studies. 9 (2): 169–183. doi:10.2307/165091. With photograph c. 1951, and list of works.
- Chandler, Charles Lyon (January 1936). "Book Reviews: 'Joel R. Poinsett, Versatile American' & 'Joel R. Poinsett, A Study in Diplomacy', by J. Fred Rippy and Herbert E. Putnam" (PDF). Pennsylvania Magazine of History and Biography. 60 (1): 84–86.
- Mitiyo Morinaka, Eliza (May 2019). "Agnes Blake Poor e os 'Pan-American Poems'". Ilha do Desterro (in Brazilian Portuguese). 72 (2): 127–151. doi:10.5007/2175-8026.2019v72n2p127.
