= The Forgotten People =

1942 speech by Australian politician Robert Menzies

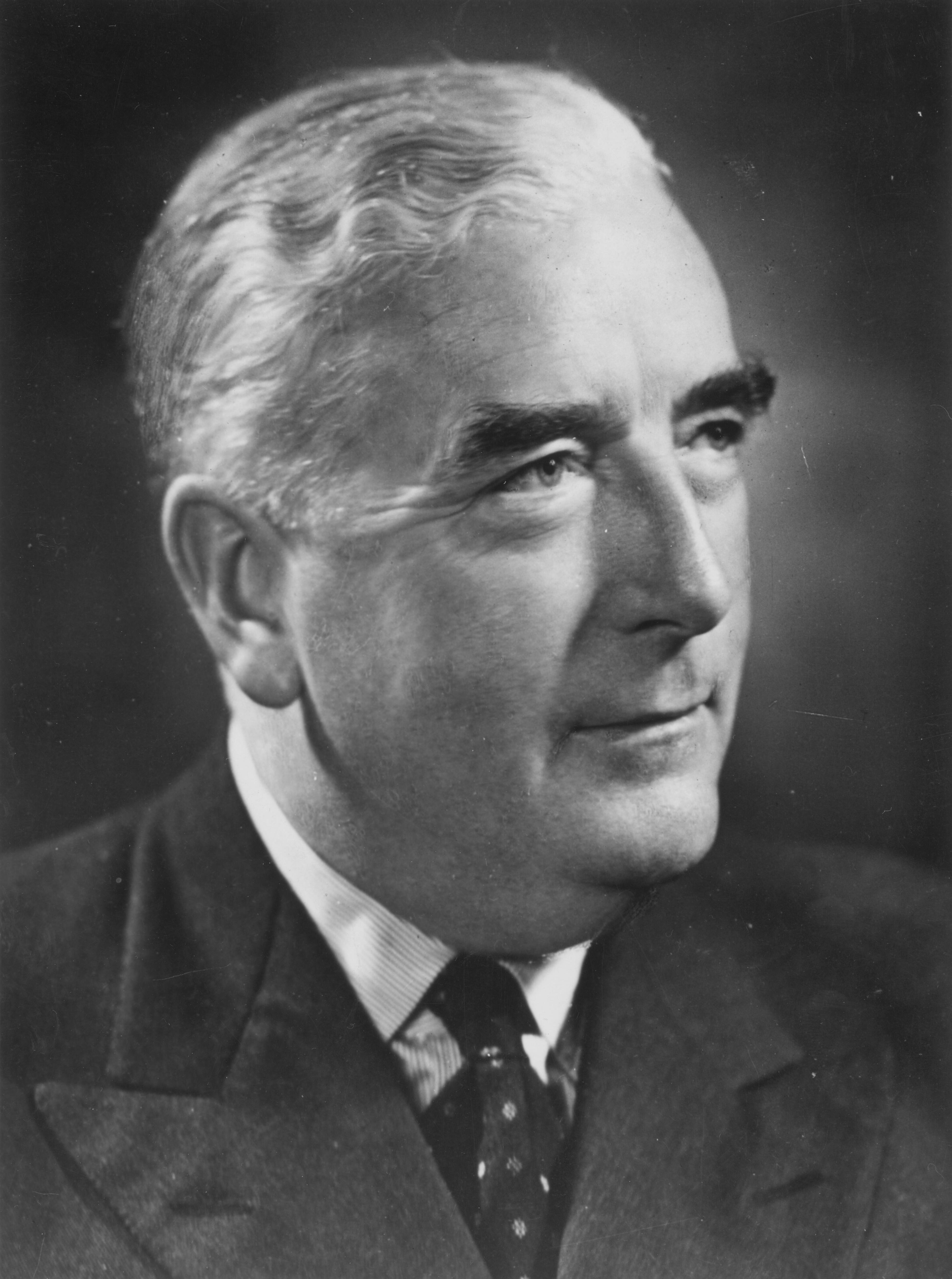
Robert Menzies, founder of the Liberal Party of Australia and Prime Minister of Australia 1939–41 (UAP) and 1949–66 (Liberal)

"The Forgotten People" is a 1942 Australian political speech and campaign slogan by Robert Menzies, an Australian politician who was Prime Minister of Australia 1939–1941 and again 1949–1966. It sought to emphasise his links to ordinary citizens and distance himself from elitism.

== Overview ==
The speech, delivered on 22 May 1942, defines and exalts Australia's middle class, which Menzies termed "the forgotten people". Menzies used the speech to outline the values and constituency that would form the basis of the Liberal Party of Australia. Menzies had previously been Prime Minister, as leader of the United Australia Party from 1939 to 1941. From 1942 onward, Menzies had maintained his public profile with his series of "Forgotten People" radio talks, similar to Franklin Roosevelt's "fireside chats" of the 1930s, in which he spoke of the middle class as the "backbone of Australia" but as nevertheless having been "taken for granted" by political parties and of being effectively powerless because of lack of wealth on the one hand, and lack of organisation on the other.

== Cultural legacy ==
Contemporary Australian politicians continue to invoke Menzies' sentiments.

Labor leader Kevin Rudd made reference to the phrase and to Menzies in the lead-up to the 2007 federal election for a perceived current generation of "Forgotten People".

Liberal Opposition Leader Tony Abbott echoed the Menzian rhetoric in his first budget-reply speech to the Gillard government in May 2011, addressing his remarks to the "forgotten families" of Australia.

After the Coalition lost the 2022 federal election and Peter Dutton became the Leader of the Opposition, he referred to this speech.

== See also ==
- "The light on the hill"
- Forgotten man, American concept
- The quiet Australians
- Battler (underdog)
- Silent majority
