= Jon McNaughton =

American painter and conservative activist

Jon Austin McNaughton
- Born: November 1967 (age 58–59); Provo, Utah, U.S.
- Education: Brigham Young University
- Notable work: The Forgotten Man (2010); One Nation Under God (2009); Expose the Truth (2018)
- Political party: Republican
- Website: jonmcnaughton.com

Jon Austin McNaughton (born November 1967) is an American artist. He is known for his paintings depicting American conservative political figures, in particular prominent Republicans, and Christian imagery. He began his style of political painting during the Barack Obama administration, creating works in support of the Tea Party movement. He subsequently became a supporter of Donald Trump.

== Career ==
McNaughton is from Provo, Utah, and studied art at Brigham Young University. After graduating, he worked in finance for eight years, planning on saving up money before working in art full time.

His early work mainly dealt with landscapes, religion and subjects related to the Church of Jesus Christ of Latter-Day Saints, which over time moved towards right-wing politics. He painted his first political artworks during the 2008 US presidential election, and then came to prominence in 2009 during the Obama presidency, when he started painting more conservative-leaning political scenes.

In 2012, Rachel Maddow's blog used his work The Forgotten Man as a caption contest, which led to an increase in sales for McNaughton.

== Reception ==
His work has been described as "Christian nationalist" by Andrew Seidel of the Freedom From Religion Foundation, "kitsch realist", and as a middle ground between realism and impressionism. Alissa Wilkinson in Vox described McNaughton as the "single most famous pro-Trump artist", and Monica Hesse described him as "one of the most significant painters of the current era".

Commentators, including Ben Davis and Jennifer Greenhill, professor of art history at University of Southern California, have said that his work is primarily designed for "digital consumption", and highlighted the links between his paintings and internet memes and internet culture. His artworks often go viral. Others, such as Greenhill and Andrew O'Hehir in Salon, have highlighted how McNaughton's knowledge of art history allows him to use famous historical paintings to complement his messages.

Ben Davis has described McNaughton's art as "always ... mediocre", and as "highly functional memes". He further compared McNaughton to religious artist Harry Anderson, and wrote that although many Twitter users think that McNaughton's artwork is to "trigger the libs", McNaughton is trying to represent an honestly held viewpoint by some Trump supporters. McNaughton himself stated that he doesn't intend to "trigger liberals", but rather "to inspire".

Steve Rose in The Guardian, while describing The Forgotten Man, identified McNaughton's work in the tradition of Norman Rockwell. Rose went on to say that McNaughton's art "provokes derision and parody more than outrage".

John McDonald in The Sydney Morning Herald described McNaughton's work as "pure propaganda", and went on to say that it provokes "similar feeling[s] of self-satisfaction that grips liberal-minded viewers ... looking at a work that celebrates a feminist or anti-racist position". Pulitzer Prize winning art critic Jerry Saltz described McNaughton's art as “bad academic derivative realism,” and “typical propaganda art, drop-dead obvious in message” which "panders and preaches to the converted and tells them what they already believe."

The Salt Lake Tribune has nicknamed McNaughton the "Provo provocateur."

== Personal life ==
McNaughton is married, a devout member of The Church of Jesus Christ of Latter-day Saints, and went on a mission for his faith to Japan in his youth. In the 2016 Republican Party presidential primaries, McNaughton supported Ted Cruz, and following Trump's victory, described himself as a "Trump observer" instead of a supporter.

== See also ==
- Thomas Kinkade – American painter (1958–2012)
