= Silent majority =

Concept in politics

- Part of the Cold War
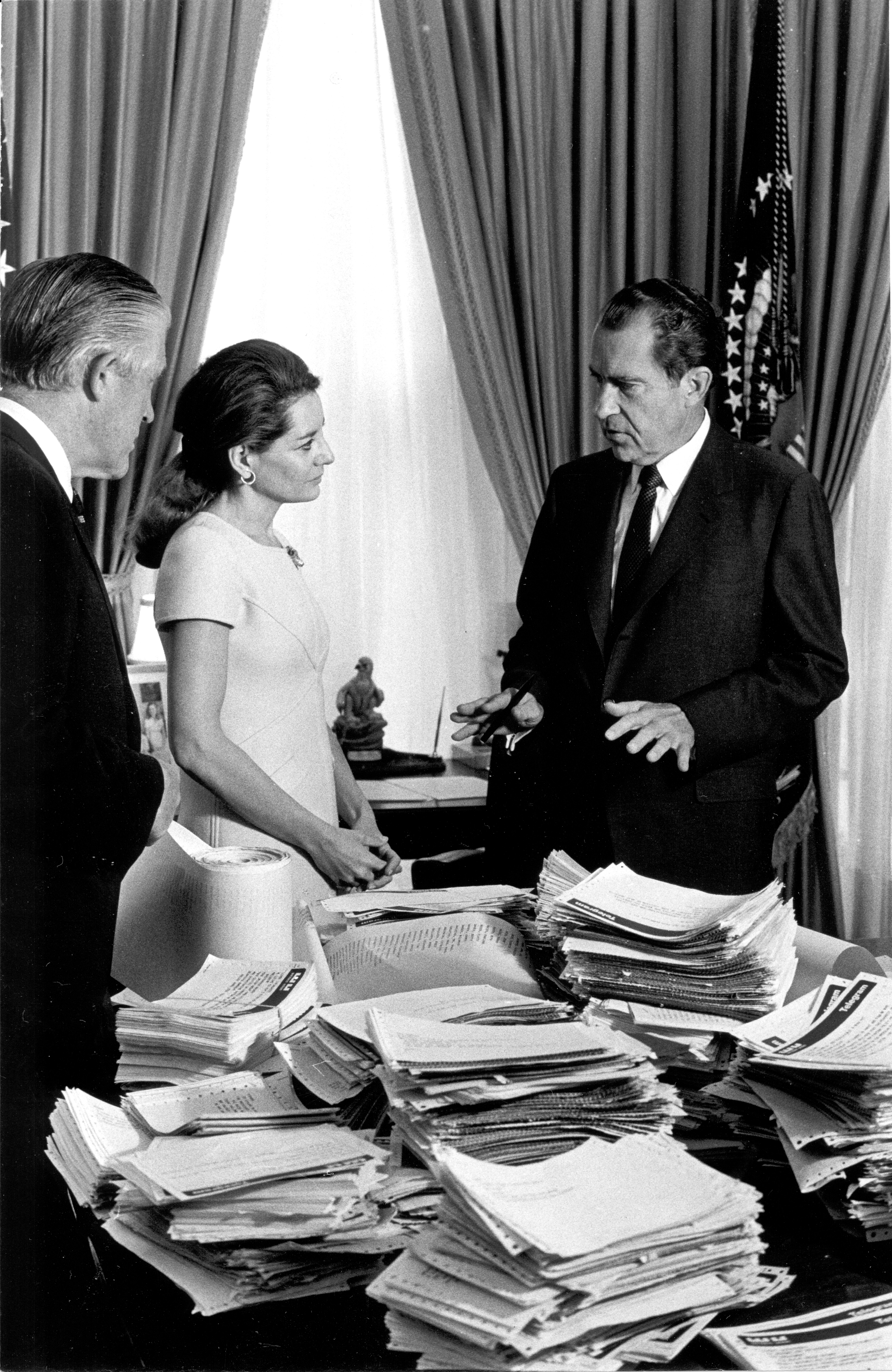
- George W. Romney and Barbara Walters standing with President Richard Nixon at a desk covered with responses to his "Silent Majority" Speech, 11/3/1969
- Date: November 3, 1969; 57 years ago
- Venue: Oval Office
- Type: Speech
- Cause: Vietnam War
- Outcome: Increased support for the administration's plan for Vietnam
- Website: voicesofdemocracy.umd.edu/nixon-silent-majority-speech-text/

The silent majority is an unspecified large group of people in a country or group who do not express their opinions publicly. The term was popularized by U.S. president Richard Nixon in a televised address on November 3, 1969, in which he said, "And so tonight—to you, the great silent majority of my fellow Americans—I ask for your support." In this usage it referred to those Americans who did not join in the large demonstrations against the Vietnam War at the time, who did not join in the counterculture, and who did not participate in public discourse. Nixon, along with many others, saw this group of Americans as being overshadowed in the media by the more vocal minority.

Preceding Nixon by half a century, it was employed in 1919 by Calvin Coolidge's campaign for the 1920 presidential nomination. Before that, the phrase was used in the 19th century as a euphemism referring to all the people who have died, and others have used it before and after Nixon to refer to groups of voters in various nations of the world.

== Early meanings ==
=== Euphemism for the dead ===
"The majority" or "the silent majority" can be traced back to the Roman writer Petronius, who wrote abiit ad plures (he is gone to the majority) to describe deceased people, since the dead outnumber the living. (In 2023 there were approximately 14.6 dead for every living person.) The phrase was used for much of the 19th century to refer to the dead. Phrases such as "gone to a better world", "gone before", and "joined the silent majority" served as euphemisms for "died". In 1902, Supreme Court Justice John Marshall Harlan employed this sense of the phrase, saying in a speech that "great captains on both sides of our Civil War have long ago passed over to the silent majority, leaving the memory of their splendid courage."

=== Groups of voters ===
In May 1831, the expression "silent majority" was spoken by Churchill C. Cambreleng, representative of New York state, before 400 members of the Tammany Society. Cambrele

ng complained to his audience about a U.S federal bill that had been rejected without full examination by the United States House of Representatives. Cambreleng's "silent majority" referred to other representatives who voted as a bloc:

Whenever majorities trample upon the rights of minorities—when men are denied even the privilege of having their causes of complaint examined into—when measures, which they deem for their relief, are rejected by the despotism of a silent majority at a second reading—when such become the rules of our legislation, the Congress of this Union will no longer justly represent a republican people.

In 1883, an anonymous author calling himself "A German" wrote a memorial to Léon Gambetta, published in The Contemporary Review, a British quarterly. Describing French Conservatives of the 1870s, the writer opined that "their mistake was, not in appealing to the country, but in appealing to it in behalf of a Monarchy which had yet to be defined, instead of a Republic which existed; for in the latter case they would have had the whole of that silent majority with them."

In 1919, Madison Avenue advertising executive and Republican Party supporter Bruce Barton employed the term to bolster Calvin Coolidge's campaign for the 1920 Republican Presidential nomination. In Collier's magazine, Barton portrayed Coolidge as the everyman candidate: "It sometimes seems as if this great silent majority had no spokesman. But Coolidge belongs with that crowd: he lives like them, he works like them, and understands."

Referring to Charles I of England, historian Veronica Wedgwood wrote this sentence in her 1955 book The King's Peace, 1637–1641: "The King in his natural optimism still believed that a silent majority in Scotland were in his favour."

== Richard Nixon ==
While Nixon was serving in 1955 as vice-president to Dwight D. Eisenhower, John F. Kennedy and his research assistants wrote in Kennedy's book Profiles in Courage, "Some of them may have been representing the actual sentiments of the silent majority of their constituents in opposition to the screams of a vocal minority..." In January 1956, Kennedy gave Nixon an autographed copy of the book. Nixon wrote back the next day to thank him: "My time for reading has been rather limited recently, but your book is first on my list and I am looking forward to reading it with great pleasure and interest." Nixon wrote Six Crises, some say his response to Kennedy's book, after visiting Kennedy at the White House in April 1961.

In 1967, labor leader George Meany asserted that those labor unionists (such as himself) who supported the Vietnam War were "the vast, silent majority in the nation." Meany's statement may have provided Nixon's speechwriters with the specific turn of phrase.

Barbara Ehrenreich and Jay Caspian Kang later argued that awareness by the media and politicians that there actually might be a silent majority opposed to the anti-war movement was heightened during the August 1968 Democratic National Convention in Chicago, especially in reaction to the widely broadcast violence by police against protesters and media there. The media reacted indignantly "against the police and the mayor" after journalists and protesters were attacked and beaten by the police, but were stunned to find that a poll showed 56% of those surveyed "sympathized with the police". "Overnight the press abandoned its protest", awaking "to the disturbing possibility that they had grown estranged from a sizable segment of the public."

In the months leading up to Nixon's 1969 speech, his vice-president Spiro T. Agnew said on May 9, "It is time for America's silent majority to stand up for its rights, and let us remember the American majority includes every minority. America's silent majority is bewildered by irrational protest..." Soon thereafter, journalist Theodore H. White analyzed the previous year's elections, writing "Never have America's leading cultural media, its university thinkers, its influence makers been more intrigued by experiment and change; but in no election have the mute masses more completely separated themselves from such leadership and thinking. Mr. Nixon's problem is to interpret what the silent people think, and govern the country against the grain of what its more important thinkers think."

On October 15, 1969, the first Moratorium to End the War in Vietnam demonstrations were held, attracting thousands of protesters. Feeling very much besieged, Nixon went on national television to deliver a rebuttal speech on November 3, 1969, where he outlined "my plan to end the war" in Vietnam. In his speech Nixon stated his policy of Vietnamization would lower American losses as the South Vietnamese Army would take on the burden of fighting the war; announced his willingness to compromise provided that North Vietnam recognized South Vietnam; and finally promised he would take "strong and effective measures" against North Vietnam if the war continued. Nixon also implicitly conceded to the anti-war movement that South Vietnam was really not very important as he maintained that the real issue was the global credibility of the United States, as he stated his belief that all of America's allies would lose faith in American promises if the United States were to abandon South Vietnam. Nixon ended his speech by saying all of this would take time, and asked for the public to support his policy of winning "peace with honor" in Vietnam as he concluded: "And so tonight, to you, the great silent majority of my fellow Americans—I ask for your support. Let us be united for peace. Let us be united against defeat. Because let us understand: North Vietnam cannot defeat or humiliate the United States. Only Americans can do that". The public reaction to the "silent majority speech" was very favorable at the time and the White House phone lines were overwhelmed with thousands of phone calls in the hours afterward as too many people called to congratulate the president for his speech.

Nixon wrote in his official memoirs, RN: The Memoirs of Richard Nixon, regarding the public response:

By morning the public reaction was confirmed. The White House mail room reported the biggest response ever to any presidential speech. More than 50,000 telegrams and 30,000 letters had poured in, and the percentage of critical messages among them was low.

Thirty-five years later, Nixon speechwriter Pat Buchanan recalled using the phrase in a memo to the president. He explained how Nixon singled out the phrase and went on to make use of it in his speech: "We [had] used 'forgotten Americans' and 'quiet Americans' and other phrases. And in one memo I mentioned twice the phrase 'silent majority', and it's double-underlined by Richard Nixon, and it would pop up in 1969 in that great speech that basically made his presidency." Buchanan noted that while he had written the memo that contained the phrase, "Nixon wrote that speech entirely by himself."

=== Nixon's constituency ===
Nixon's silent majority referred mainly to the older generation (those World War II veterans in all parts of the U.S.) but it also described many young people in the Midwest, West and in the South, many of whom eventually served in Vietnam. The Silent Majority was mostly populated by blue collar white people who did not take an active part in politics: suburban, exurban and rural middle class voters. They did, in some cases, support the conservative policies of many politicians. According to columnist Kenneth Crawford, "Nixon's forgotten men should not be confused with Roosevelt's", adding that "Nixon's are comfortable, housed, clad and fed, who constitute the middle stratum of society. But they aspire to more and feel menaced by those who have less."

In his famous speech, Nixon contrasted his international strategy of political realism with the "idealism" of a "vocal minority." He stated that following the radical minority's demands to withdraw all troops immediately from Vietnam would bring defeat and be disastrous for world peace. Appealing to the silent majority, Nixon asked for united support "to end the war in a way that we could win the peace." The speech was one of the first to codify the Nixon Doctrine, according to which, "the defense of freedom is everybody's business—not just America's business." After giving the speech, Nixon's approval ratings which had been hovering around 50% shot up to 81% in the nation and 86% in the South.

In January 1970, Time put on their cover an abstract image of a man and a woman representing "Middle America" as a replacement for their annual "Man of the Year" award. Publisher Roy E. Larsen wrote that "the events of 1969 transcended specific individuals. In a time of dissent and 'confrontation', the most striking new factor was the emergence of the Silent Majority as a powerfully assertive force in U.S. society." Larsen described how the silent majority had elected Nixon, had put a man on the moon, and how this demographic felt threatened by "attacks on traditional values".

The silent majority theme has been a contentious issue amongst journalists since Nixon used the phrase. Some thought Nixon used it as part of the Southern strategy; others claim it was Nixon's way of dismissing the obvious protests going on around the country, and Nixon's attempt to get other Americans not to listen to the protests. Whatever the rationale, Nixon won a landslide victory in 1972, taking 49 of 50 states, vindicating his "silent majority". The opposition vote was split successfully, with 80% of George Wallace supporters voting for Nixon rather than George McGovern, unlike Wallace himself.

Nixon's use of the phrase was part of his strategy to divide Americans and to polarize them into two groups. He used "divide and conquer" tactics to win his political battles, and in 1971 he directed Agnew to speak about "positive polarization" of the electorate. The "silent majority" shared Nixon's anxieties and fears that normalcy was being eroded by changes in society. The other group was composed of intellectuals, cosmopolitans, professionals and liberals, those willing to "live and let live." Both groups saw themselves as the higher patriots. According to Republican pollster Frank Luntz, "silent majority" is but one of many labels which have been applied to the same group of voters. According to him, past labels used by the media include "silent majority" in the 1960s, "forgotten middle class" in the 1970s, "angry white males" in the 1980s, "soccer moms" in the 1990s, and "NASCAR dads" in the 2000s.

== Later use in the United States ==
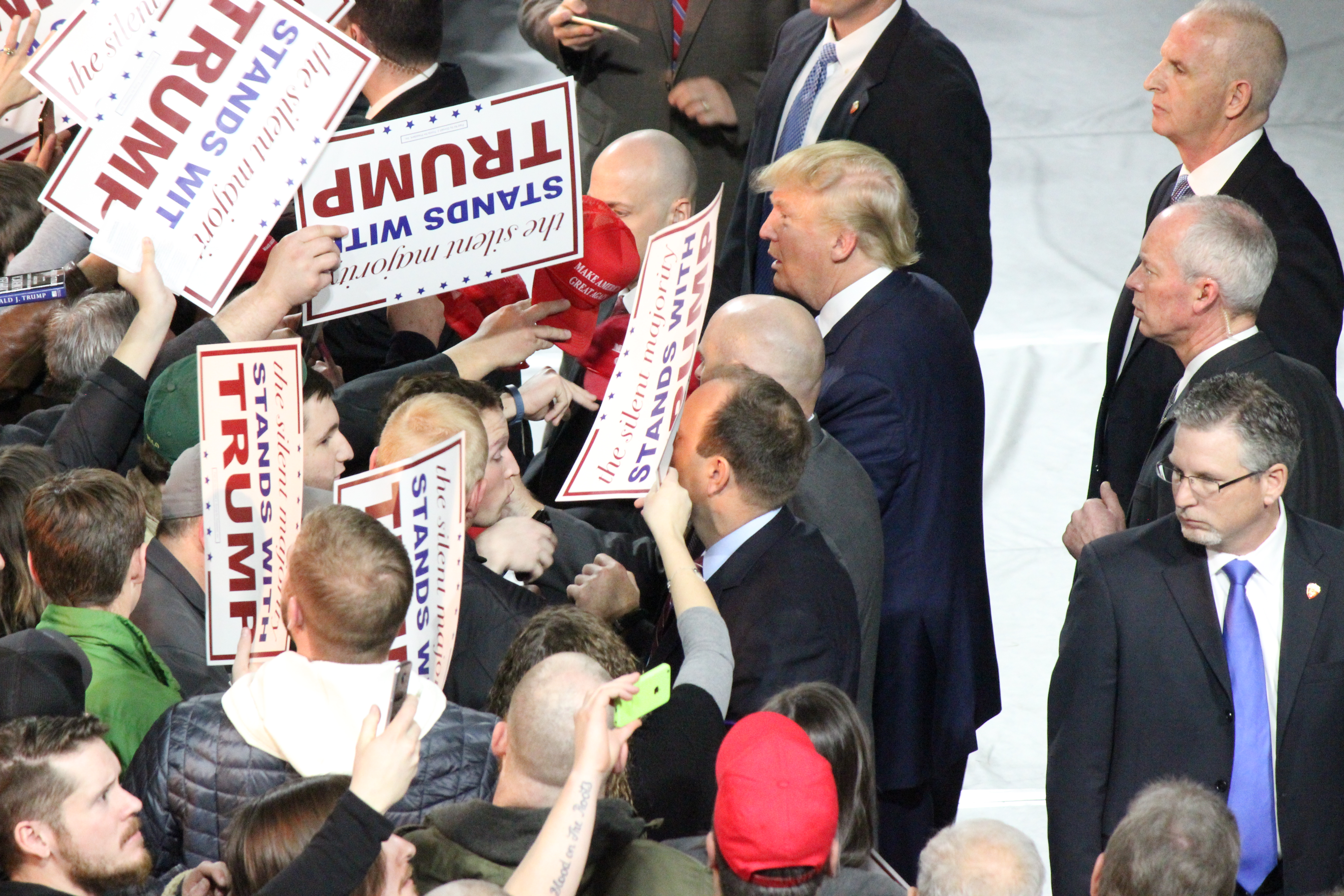
Donald Trump and supporters attend a rally in Muscatine, Iowa, in January 2016. Multiple supporters hold up signs, which read "The silent majority stands with Trump".

The phrase "silent majority" has also been used in the political campaigns of Ronald Reagan during the 1970s and 1980s, the Republican Revolution in the 1994 elections, and the victories of Rudy Giuliani and Michael Bloomberg.

During Donald Trump's 2016 presidential campaign, he said at a campaign rally on July 11, 2015, in Phoenix, Arizona, that "the silent majority is back, and we're going to take our country back". He also referred to the silent majority in subsequent speeches and advertisement, as did the press when describing those who voted for his election as President in 2016. In the midst of the George Floyd protests, he once again invoked the silent majority. CNN analyst Harry Enten described that Trump's support fits better with the term "loud minority", based on the fact that neither did he win the popular vote in 2016 nor did he hit 50% in any live interview opinion poll throughout his first presidency. Jay Caspian Kang argues that some politicians and analysts (Jim Clyburn, Chuck Rocha) feel the unexpected increase in support for Donald Trump among blacks and Latinos in the 2020 election reflects a new silent majority (including some non-whites) reacting against calls for defunding the police and the arrogance of "woke white consultants".

== Later use outside the United States ==
"Silent majority" was the name of a movement (officially called Anticommunist City Committee) active in Milan, Italy, from 1971 to 1974 and headed by the former monarchist partisan Adamo Degli Occhi, that expressed the hostility of the middle class to the 1968 movement. At the beginning it was of conservative tendency; later it moved more and more to the right, and in 1974 Degli Occhi was arrested because of his relationships with the terroristic movement Movimento di Azione Rivoluzionaria (MAR).

In 1975, in Portugal, then president António de Spínola used the term in confronting the more radical forces of post-revolutionary Portugal.

The phrase was also used by Quebec Premier Jean Charest during the 2012 Student Strike to refer to what he perceived as the majority of the Quebec voters supporting the tuition hikes.

The term was used by British Prime Minister David Cameron during the 2014 Scottish independence referendum; Cameron expressed his belief that most Scots opposed independence, while implicitly conceding they may not be as vocal as the people who support it.

In 2019, the Prime Minister of Australia, Scott Morrison, acknowledged the quiet Australians in his federal election victory speech.

In the face of rising opposition, the Hong Kong government often claims there is a silent majority that is too afraid to voice their support, and a group called "Silent Majority for Hong Kong" was set up in 2013 to counteract the Occupy Central with Love and Peace movement. In 2019, when the democratic movement became increasingly violent, the Carrie Lam administration and Beijing authorities appealed to the "silent majority" to dissociate themselves from the radical activists and to vote for the pro-government camp in the District Council elections, which were seen as a de facto referendum on the protests. However, with a record turnout of over 70%, the pro-democracy camp won 80% of overall seats and controlled 17 out of the 18 District Councils. A commentator of The New Statesman deduced that Hong Kong's true silent majority stood on the side of the democratic cause. Foreign Policy stated that Beijing had been confident of a huge pro-government victory as a result of a delusion created by its own propaganda.

== See also ==
- 1% rule
- Bradley effect
- Covert racism
- Consensus decision-making
- Democracy
- Mainstream media
- Majoritarianism
- Majority rule
- Pact of forgetting
- Shy Tory Factor
- Social desirability bias
- Spiral of silence
- The Forgotten People
- The Quiet Australians
- Visible minority
