= The Forgotten Man (painting) =

Painting by Jon McNaughton

- Artist: Jon McNaughton
- Year: 2010
- Medium: Oil painting
- Owner: Sean Hannity

The Forgotten Man is a 2010 painting by the American artist Jon McNaughton. It depicts then President Barack Obama standing in front of the White House beside a destitute citizen while being haunted by figures of all past presidents. The subject matter of the painting was inspired by the passage of the Affordable Care Act. McNaughton unveiled the painting in a YouTube video on September 14, 2010. It was the second in a series of politically charged portraits painted by McNaughton. The painting, along with subsequent works by McNaughton, have attracted notoriety by fans for their unsubtle political themes, while critics have focused on their perceived "so bad it's good" qualities.

== Description ==
The 43 men who as of 2010 had served as President of the United States are gathered in a park in front of the White House, above which the American flag can be seen, at half mast. In general, the 18th and 19th century presidents are on the left, the later ones on the right, some appear lost in thought while others, Bill Clinton and the two Roosevelts, are applauding. The only non-president in the painting is a young man, who sits alone on a park bench, hunched over in despair, contemplating his future. Some of the presidents, including Washington, Jefferson, Lincoln and Reagan reach out to him, while looking toward Barack Obama who stands in the foreground right. James Madison, the Father of the Constitution, is outraged by Obama's actions, for beneath Obama's foot is the U.S. Constitution. Scattered on the ground are dollar bills, laws and amendments that form part of the Bill of Rights.

== Reception and influence ==
The painting gained initial notoriety in 2010 when it was featured on MSNBC television host Rachel Maddow's blog as part of a caption contest. In 2012, it drew satirical praise during an episode of The Colbert Report from Stephen Colbert's conservative persona.

After being purchased by conservative commentator Sean Hannity in 2016, The Forgotten Man was rumored to have been bought as a gift for then President-elect Donald Trump, though a spokesperson for Fox News (Hannity's employer) later clarified that the painting was never intended to be given as a gift.

The painting has drawn comparisons to a 1934 Maynard Dixon painting of the same name.

== Variations on the theme ==
In a follow up painting titled The Empowered Man, McNaughton has the figure from The Forgotten Man standing and looking to the skies while holding the Constitution aloft with one hand and a large stack of paper currency in his other hand. In response, the figures of American Founders along with Abraham Lincoln, Ronald Reagan, and John F. Kennedy smile, and either applaud or pray in thanksgiving. The figures of Woodrow Wilson, Franklin D. Roosevelt, Lyndon B. Johnson, and George W. Bush either ignore the man or look ashamed. The figure of Barack Obama has his hands stretching in front of him to ward off what he is seeing as he looks at the Constitution.

In 2017 McNaughton produced another piece working off the same theme entitled You Are Not Forgotten taking place in the same setting. In the work, then-president Donald Trump steps on the head of a serpent (invoking the Protevangelium) and accompanied by soldiers, veterans, and police officers looks on approvingly as the same figure from The Forgotten Man painting finishes planting a seedling alongside his wife and daughter.

== See also ==
- Protest art
- Forgotten man
