= Forgotten man =

American concept on neglected interests

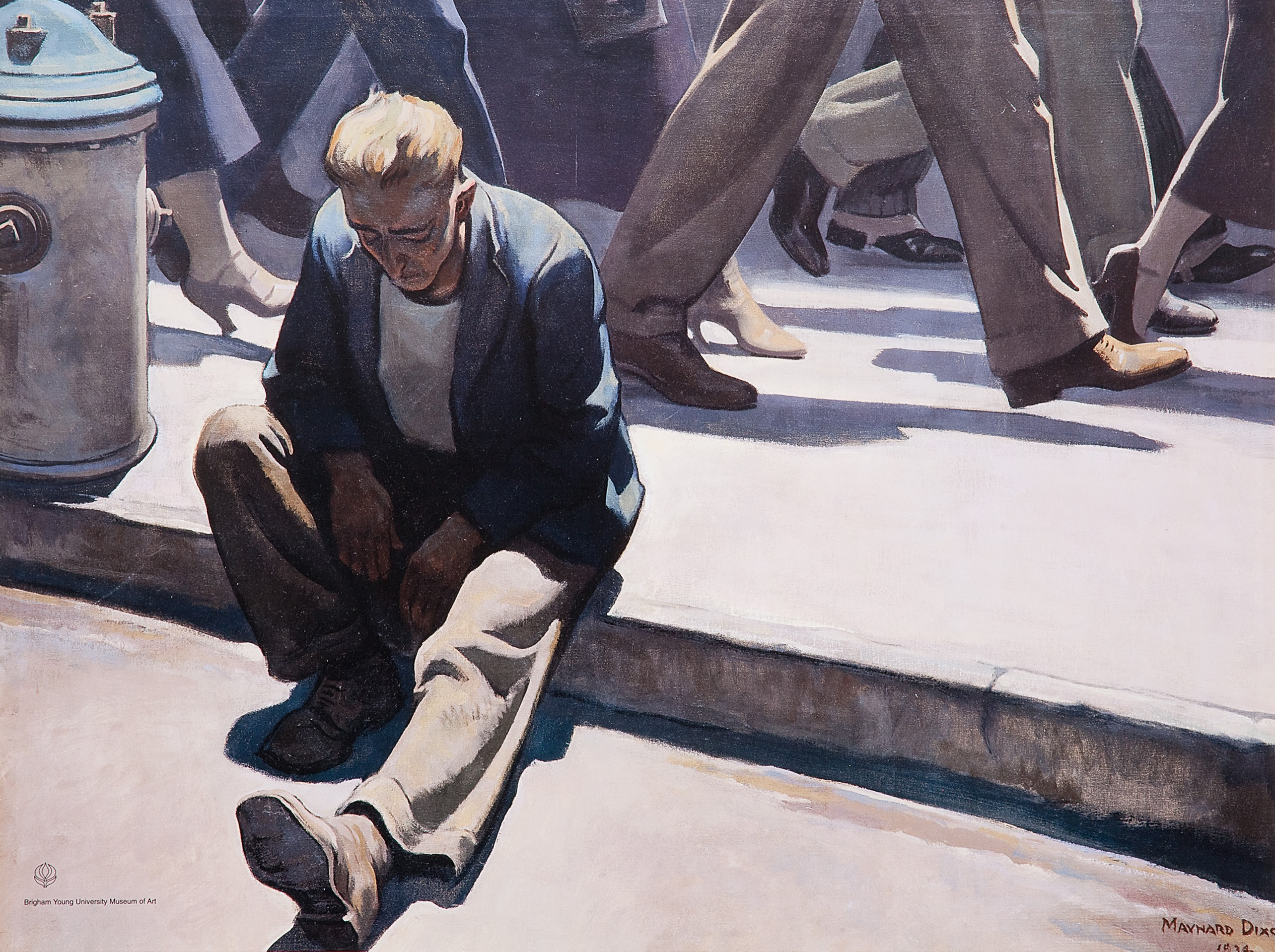
Forgotten Man (Maynard Dixon, 1934)

The forgotten man is a political concept in the United States centered on those whose interests have been neglected. The first main invocation of this concept came from William Graham Sumner in an 1883 lecture in Brooklyn entitled The Forgotten Man (published posthumously in 1918) who articulated such a man to be one who has been compelled to pay for reformist programs. In 1932, President Franklin D. Roosevelt appropriated the phrase in a speech, using it to refer to those at the bottom of the economic scale whom Roosevelt believed the state needed to help.

== Sumner's forgotten man ==
Yale University professor William Graham Sumner appears to be the first to use the phrase "the forgotten man", in his 1876 essay. His algebraic definition of the forgotten man was "C", who is coerced into helping the man at the economic bottom "X", by "A" and "B" who demand charity for "X".

As soon as A observes something which seems to him wrong, from which X is suffering, A talks it over with B, and A and B then propose to get a law passed to remedy the evil and help X. Their law always proposes to determine what C shall do for X, or, in better case, what A, B, and C shall do for X... What I want to do is to look up C. I want to show you what manner of man he is. I call him the Forgotten Man. perhaps the appellation is not strictly correct. he is the man who never is thought of.... I call him the forgotten man... He works, he votes, generally he prays—but he always pays..."

== Roosevelt's forgotten man ==
Roosevelt used the phrase in a radio address he gave on April 7, 1932, to describe the poor men who needed money and were not getting it, promoting his New Deal. Roosevelt said,

These unhappy times call for the building of plans that rest upon the forgotten, the unorganized but indispensable units of economic power, for plans like those of 1917 that build from the bottom up and not from the top down, that put their faith once more in the forgotten man at the bottom of the economic pyramid.

The term quickly appeared within popular culture, supplanting Sumner's concept of the forgotten man. In the film I Am a Fugitive from a Chain Gang (1932) an editorial on the plight of a unjustly-treated prison escapee who has disappeared asks: "What has become of James Allen? - Is he too, just another forgotten man?" Joan Blondell and Etta Moten Barnett sing the song "Remember My Forgotten Man" in the climactic sequence of the film Gold Diggers of 1933, with scenes of mass unemployment. In the film My Man Godfrey (1936) a Boston Brahmin is mistaken for a tramp when frivolous socialites are looking for a "forgotten man" in a scavenger hunt. In the 1956 film High Society, the Cole Porter song sung by Bing Crosby and Frank Sinatra, "Well, Did You Evah!", opens with the lines: "I have heard among this clan, you are called the forgotten man".

== See also ==
- The Forgotten Man, 2010 painting
- The Forgotten People and The quiet Australians, similar Australian concepts
