= The quiet Australians =

Concept in politics

"The quiet Australians" is an expression that was used by Australian politician Scott Morrison when his Liberal/National Coalition unexpectedly won the 2019 Australian federal election on 18 May 2019, meaning Morrison would continue as Prime Minister of Australia. Describing the outcome as a miracle, Morrison stated that "the quiet Australians ... have won a great victory":

This is, this is the best country in the world in which to live. It is those Australians that we have been working for, for the last five and a half years since we came to Government, under Tony Abbott's leadership back in 2013. It has been those Australians who have worked hard every day, they have their dreams, they have their aspirations; to get a job, to get an apprenticeship, to start a business, to meet someone amazing. To start a family, to buy a home, to work hard and provide the best you can for your kids. To save your retirement and to ensure that when you're in your retirement, that you can enjoy it because you've worked hard for it. These are the quiet Australians who have won a great victory tonight.

Morrison used this term prior to the election stating "Too many of us have been quiet for too long and it's time to speak up", and "To those quiet Australians who are out there, now is not the time to turn back". After the election, he compared Quiet Australians to Robert Menzies's "forgotten people" and John Howard's "battlers". In December, when congratulating Boris Johnson for winning the 2019 United Kingdom general election, Morrison asked him to "say g'day to the quiet Britons for us".

The term "The Quiet Australians" has been referenced by media outlets and commentators. Stan Grant wrote that "Retirees, middle-class parents, and those dependent on the mining industry for their livelihoods all felt they were in the firing line. Christian leaders now say that religious freedom was a sleeper issue that turned votes in critical marginal seats. Throughout the world, long-silent voices are making themselves heard and it is shaking up politics as usual. People are saying they want to belong and they want their leaders to put them first". The Guardian compared Morrison's Quiet Australians to Richard Nixon's "silent majority."

Media outlets have been investigating who the Quiet Australians might be. The Australian referred to voters who ignored messaging that "presumed to tell them how to think and what to do" and voted for a Prime Minister that "spoke not over but right to them". SBS News stated that "They don't make a lot of noise online or call into radio stations, they don't campaign in the streets or protest outside parliament".

The Australian Financial Review used data from the Australian Election Study to define Quiet Australians as being "increasingly disaffected with the political system, and that Education surpassed income as the demographic characteristic most correlated with a swing to either major party". Moreover, the "election also saw the re-emergence of religion as a political force". ABC's Q&A's panelists discussed the 2019 election results in an episode titled "First Australians and Quiet Australians".

The Order of Australia Association uses the term "Quiet Australians" for its collection of stories embodied within the service rendered by award recipients to serve as a national resource to inspire and educate Australians.

== 2022 Australian federal election ==
3 years later, the result of the 2022 Australian federal election was a loss for Morrison's Coalition. The Opposition Labor Party formed majority government, with Anthony Albanese as the new Prime Minister. The Australian Greens had unprecedented success, and several Liberal seats were lost to teal independents.

In the leadup to the election, media outlets and politicians invoked the Quiet Australians:

Senior Liberal MP and Treasurer Josh Frydenberg played down polls suggesting he was in danger of losing the blue-ribbon (very safe Liberal) seat of Kooyong, by saying “There are many – as the Prime Minister calls them – quiet Australians out there.” Frydenberg ended up losing the seat to teal independent Monique Ryan.

The Sydney Morning Herald published an opinion piece on various types of voters in Australia, and quoted Rodney Tiffen, a Sydney University political science professor, who identified the label as more of a tactical grouping and an assertion that the loudest opinions may not be the majority, rather than a distinct group. The article compared the quiet Australians with the "Canberra bubble" - a term for political insiders who are out of touch with the expectations of mainstream Australian society.

The Guardian argued that while in the previous election Morrison targeted quiet Australians, this time he was instead appealing to anxious Australian parents by focusing on transgender people in a "culture war"

After the election, media outlets attempted to explain the result by again invoking the quiet Australians:

Sky News Australia argued that the Liberals should support the construction of a nuclear power industry, as an alternative to fossil fuels, to win back quiet Australians who had deserted the party for teal independents who campaigned for action on anthropogenic climate change.

Paul Osborne, writing for the Australian Associated Press, argued that Morrison had angered the quiet Australians and turned them "cranky."

Peter Hartcher wrote in Sydney Morning Herald that "the quiet Australians spoke and they said 'enough.'" Hartcher argued that Morrison had tried to transform the Liberals into a right wing populist party and thus had lost the support of fiscal conservatives and liberals to teals, while at the same time Morrison's failures of crisis leadership had lost working-class and middle-class seats to Labor. Hartcher identified all these groups as quiet Australians.

The Guardian commented on the Greens campaign strategy of mass door-knocking and conversations with voters, reporting that the Greens planned to repeat this "social work" strategy to target quiet Australians.

Morrison stepped down as Liberal leader and commented on his election loss, saying he looked forward to going back to being a quiet Australian in the shire of Sydney.

== See also ==
- Majoritarianism
- Shy Tory Factor
- Silent majority
- Social desirability bias
- The Forgotten People
