= Paraguay expedition =

American retaliatory diplomatic mission

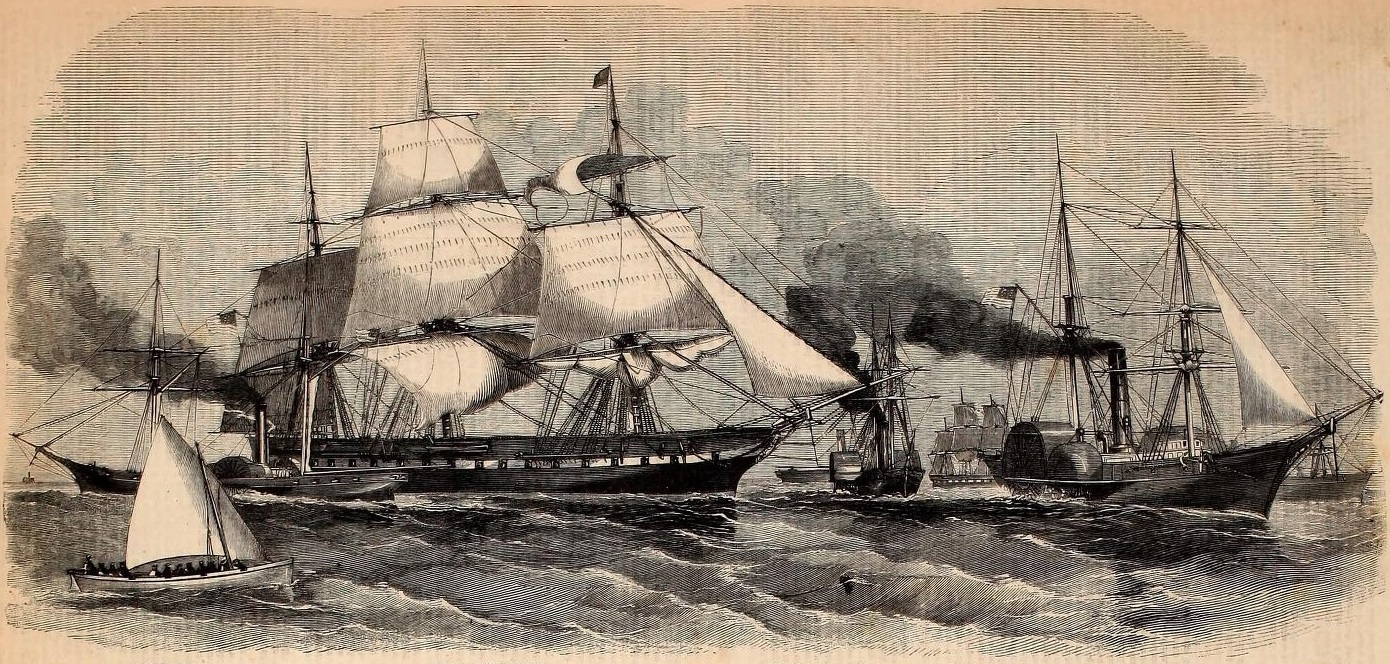
The Paraguay Squadron according to Harper's Weekly, 26 October 1858.

The Paraguay expedition (1858–1859) was an American diplomatic mission and nineteen-ship squadron ordered by President James Buchanan to South America to demand reparation for certain wrongs alleged to have been done by Paraguay (including firing upon a United States naval vessel), or seize its capital Asunción if this was refused. It has been described as "an incident so grotesque and dangerous" that escalated from "a series of minor misunderstandings".

The expedition was sent without an adequate investigation of the facts, including Paraguay's defensive capabilities. Most modern scholars have considered Buchanan's complaints were probably unjustified. The real cause of the misunderstandings was that neither country had employed a competent diplomatic service. Buchanan may have had an ulterior motive, such as to distract public opinion from the domestic concerns that afflicted his presidency; more sinister explanations have been suggested; but possibly Buchanan may have meant to emulate the success of the earlier Perry Expedition, which had "opened up" an isolated Japan.

At the time it was the largest naval squadron ever sent from the United States, and it caused a great impression in the Platine basin. Even so, had it come to war, the strategic position of landlocked Paraguay in the heart of South America was strong. Further, owing to shore-based administrative incompetence, the squadron had serious deficiencies. Hence the expedition has been described as "woefully inadequate" for the job and "a military bluff carried off with commendable skill". However, because of the conciliatory attitude of the U.S. diplomatic representative Judge James B. Bowlin — who to get an equitable resolution deviated from his instructions — and to the fact that Paraguay needed international friends, normal relations between the two countries were restored. Until that happened, only one ship entered Paraguayan waters, by mutual agreement.

In financial terms, the expedition cost perhaps $3 million for which Paraguay paid $9,412 for the sake of peace and quiet. Nevertheless, Buchanan claimed a foreign policy success. There was disinformation, some of whose effects persist to this day.

== President Buchanan's complaints ==
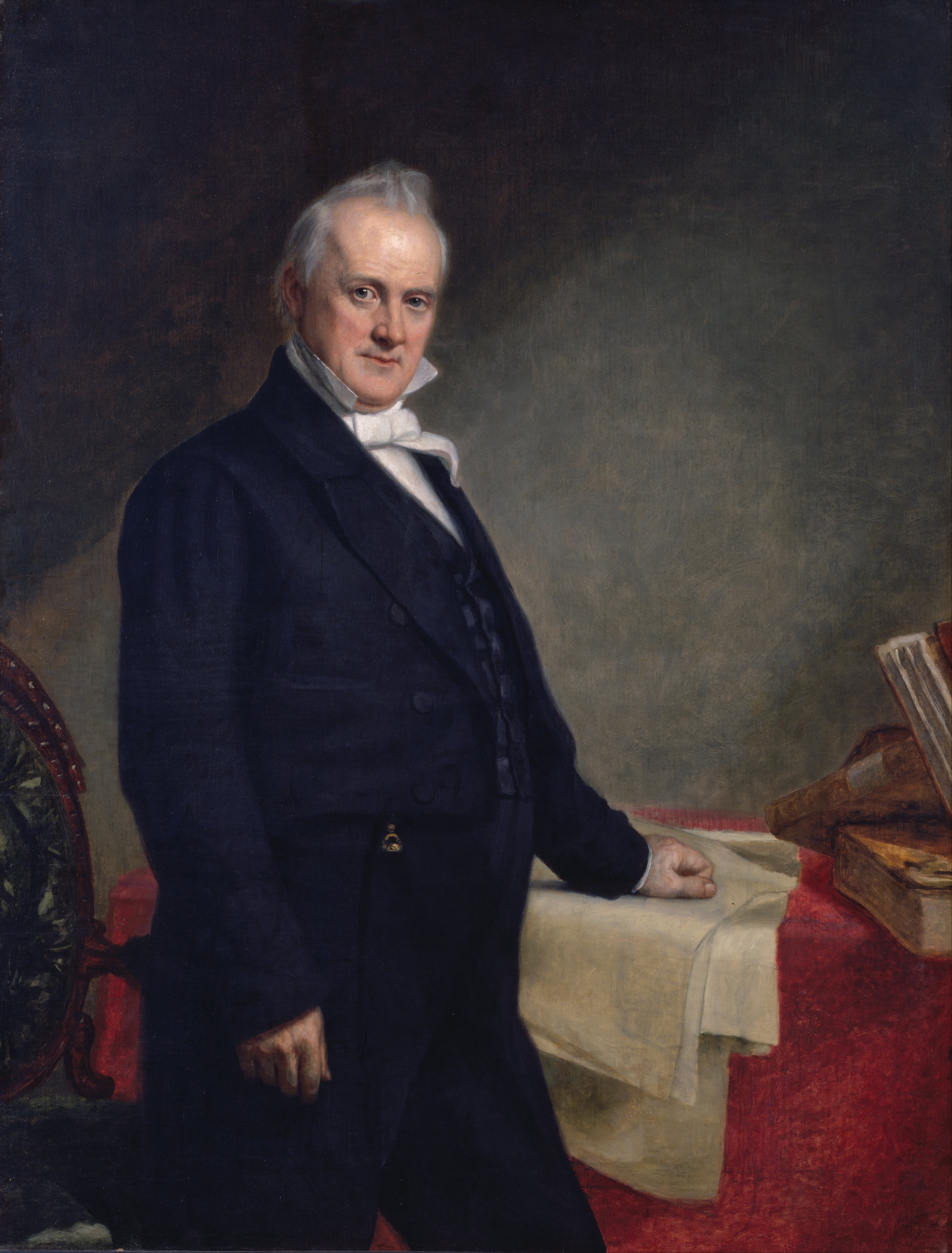
James Buchanan in 1859. His presidency was troubled by dissolving national cohesion, seceding States.

President Buchanan has been described a "doughface" who won office by promising to lead an aggressive foreign policy.

In Buchanan's own words, the government of Paraguay had:-

1. "[S]eized and appropriated the property of American citizens residing in Paraguay, in a violent and arbitrary manner";
2. "upon frivolous and even insulting pretexts, refused to ratify the treaty of friendship, commerce and navigation";
3. "fired upon the United States steamer Water Witch ... and killed the sailor at the helm, while she was peacefully employed in surveying the Parana river".

The honor, as well as the interest of the United States, concluded Buchanan, demanded satisfaction. In his first annual message to Congress (8 December 1857) he said he would make a demand for redress, "in a firm but conciliatory manner", but backed up by force if necessary.

On 2 June 1858 a joint resolution of Congress authorized the President to obtain satisfaction, using force if necessary.

== The antecedents ==
=== The adventures of Edward A. Hopkins ===
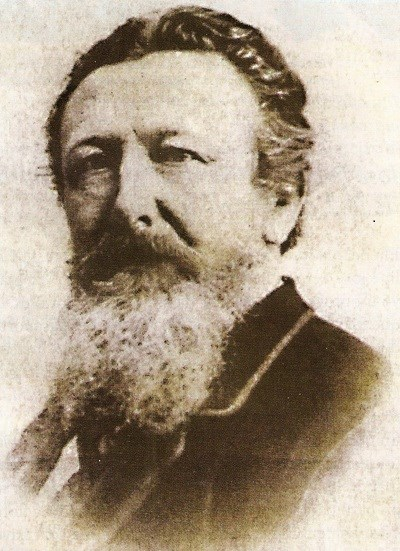
Edward A. Hopkins, 'quarrelsome, pugnacious, and arrogant', was sent to represent the US in touchy Paraguay.

Edward Augustus Hopkins was an adventurer who caused trouble with the government of Paraguay. As will appear, insofar as a single person could be to blame for the Paraguayan debacle, that person was Hopkins.

A former midshipman in the U.S. Navy who had been court-martialled three times and dismissed from his squadron, he has been described as "undisciplined, imprudent, arrogant, aggressive", "unruly, quarrelsome, pugnacious, and arrogant", and "swaggering, bullying and tyranical". According to yet another scholar,

Edward A. Hopkins was an unusual man and therein lay his difficulties. His outstanding characteristics were presumptuousness, egotism and marvellously bad judgment. These characteristics were combined with a lively imagination that Hopkins resorted to whenever reality became too cumbersome — which was most of the time! Hopkins managed to combine these characteristics in such an unusual manner that he antagonized everyone who had the misfortune of dealing with him.

Despite this, he was twice sent to represent the United States in Paraguay.

==== His first appointment to Paraguay ====
In 1845 James Buchanan, at that time Secretary of State, needed to appoint a confidential agent to visit Paraguay, so he could determine whether it was worth granting diplomatic recognition. The man Buchanan chose for the job was the 22-year old Edward A. Hopkins. Despite his unpromising record, Hopkins got himself appointed, through family influence.

Hopkins had no diplomatic status. His sole functions were to communicate American goodwill and to report the facts on the ground to the US government. He soon exceeded his remit, promising that the US would recognize the government of Paraguay. He also undertook to mediate a longstanding dispute between Paraguay and Buenos Aires dictator Juan Manuel de Rosas, falsely claiming he had US authorization to do it, and making wild and intemperate proposals. When Rosas paid no attention, Hopkins wrote him a letter that was so insulting the United States felt constrained to apologize. Hopkins was recalled.

==== His second appointment ====
Hopkins was a persuasive optimist. He persuaded prominent Rhode Island investors, including Governor Samuel G. Arnold, that Paraguay was an excellent business opportunity. They incorporated the United States and Paraguay Navigation Company. With a capital of $100,000, it would build and sail ships on the rivers of South America as well as conduct other business. Hopkins had himself appointed U.S. Consul in Paraguay, a diplomatic post he secured despite his calamitous record: he was the only applicant. He assumed office in June 1853. He was also the general agent of the Rhode Island company in Paraguay.

Emergent Paraguay

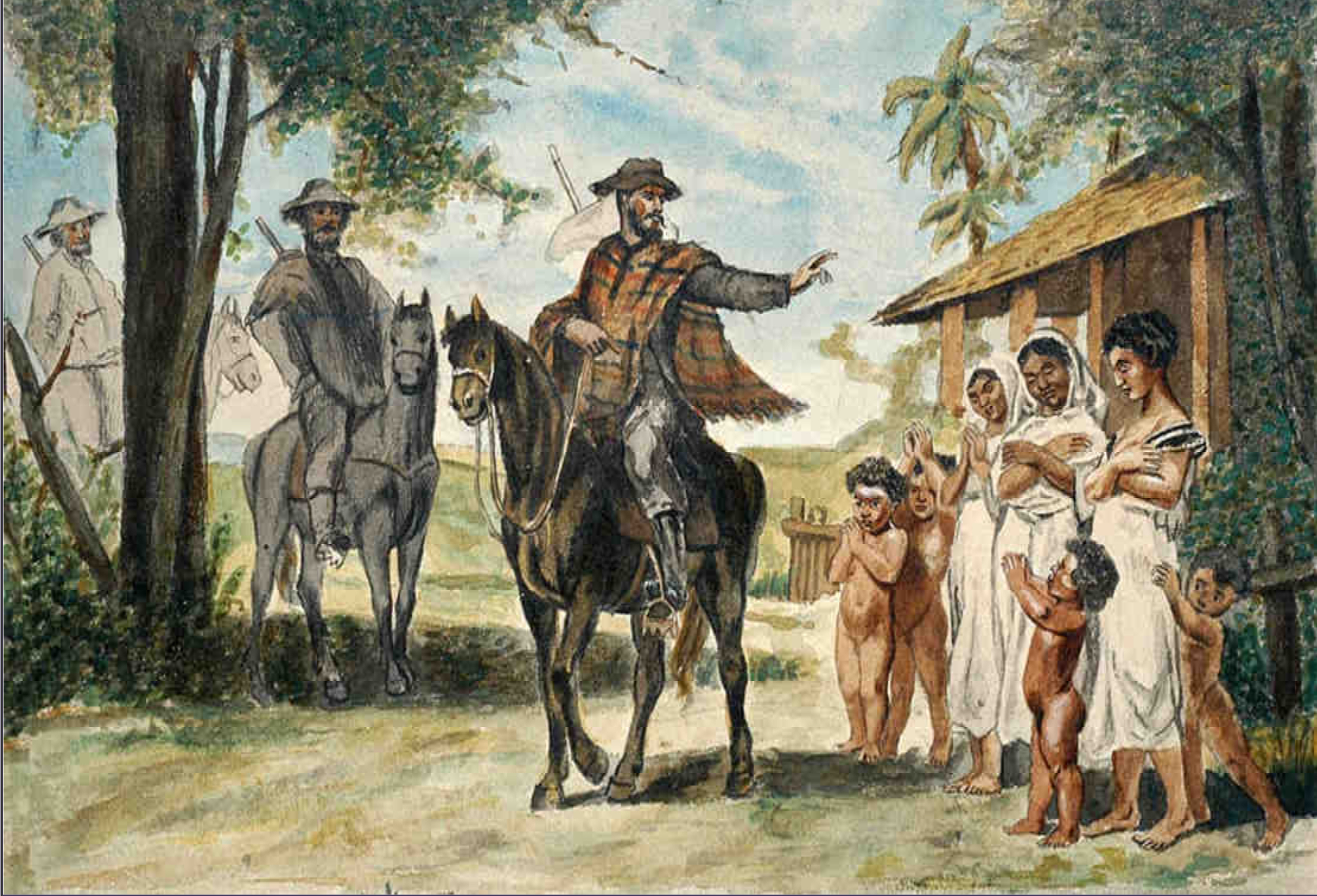
Rural tradition (tupanói). Paraguayans showed respect for elders by asking their blessing.

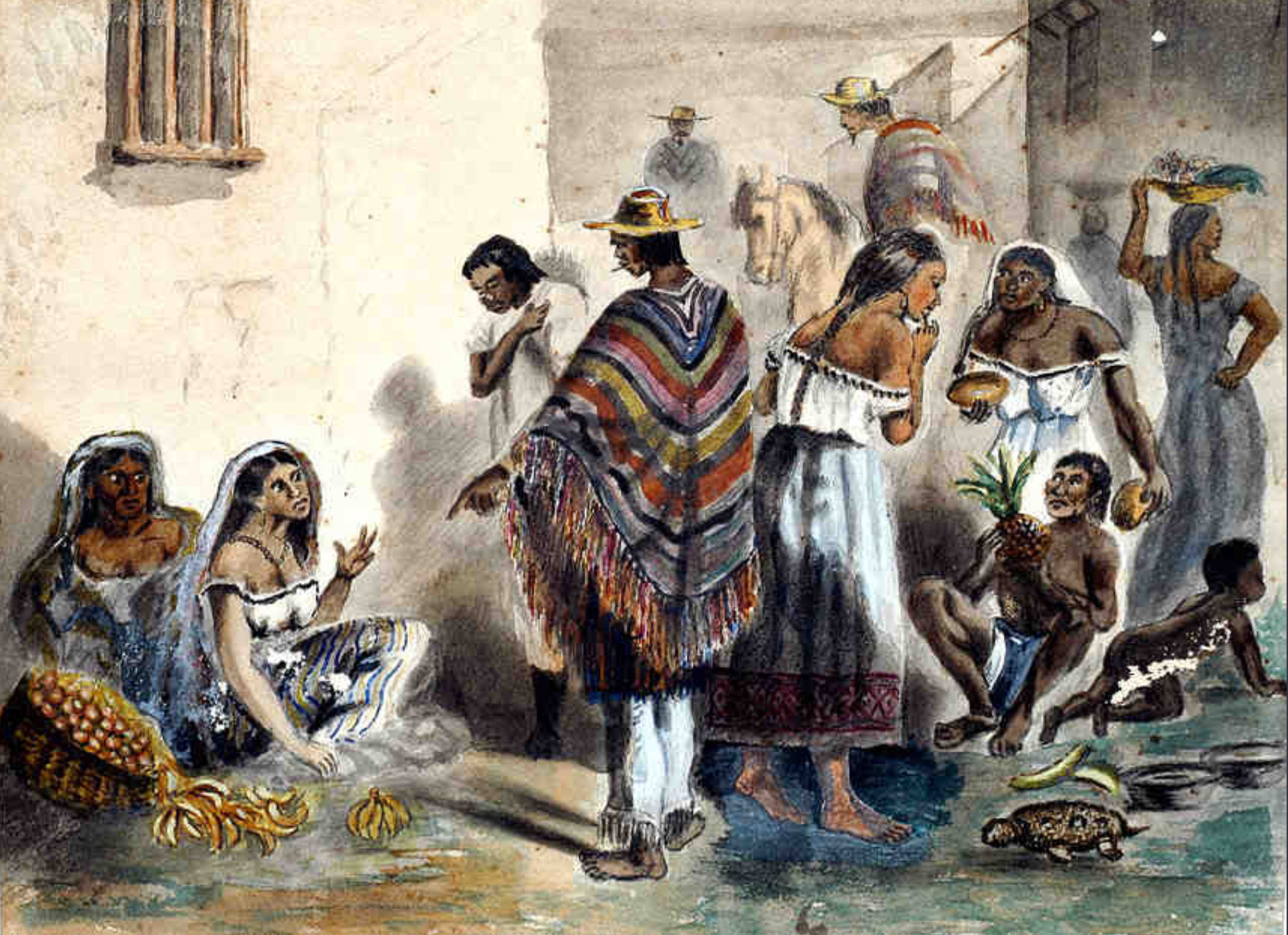
The market, 19th century Asunción

(Paintings by José Ignacio Garmendia, Museo Roca)

The business venture of the United States and Paraguay Navigation Company was a failure. Its main asset, a steamship loaded with machinery and merchandise, was shipwrecked well before it could get to Paraguay. (According to a pro-Paraguayan source, not necessarily reliable, the shipwreck was intentional, the object being to use the insurance payout to fund the venture.)

Salvaging the cargo as best as he could, Hopkins arrived in Paraguay and borrowed 11,500 pesos from its president, Carlos Antonio López. Hopkins started a sawmill and a cigar factory which — thanks to López — were allowed to operate on favorable terms, e.g. they were manned by cheap conscript labor. The commercial viability of the venture entirely depended on the goodwill of López.

==== Relations with president López ====
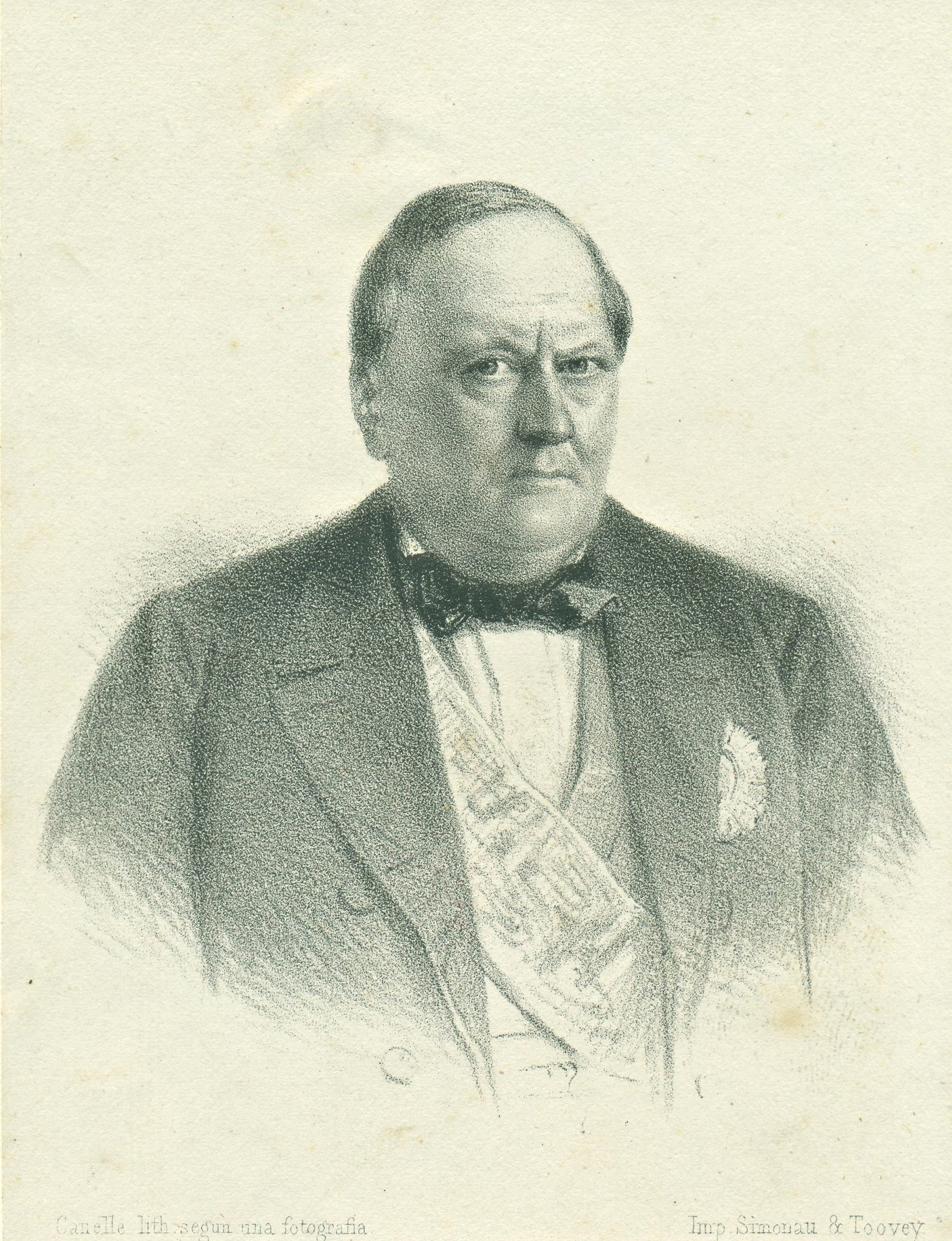
Carlos Antonio López, President of Paraguay. An irascible dictator, nevertheless he is known as the Great Builder of his country.

President López was an irascible, corpulent dictator; furthermore, a micromanager. Even so, he is now acknowledged as one of Paraguay's better rulers — a modernizer. López was gradually bringing Paraguay out of its long period of isolation. Because their country had an insecure history, Paraguayans were said to be xenophobic and touchy. In colonial times Paraguay had had to struggle against endemic Indian and Portuguese raids; after its independence, with Brazilian and Buenos Aires bullying.

López wanted good relations with all foreign powers. Yet over the years he had serious conflicts with Brazil, Buenos Aires, Britain, France, and the United States. According to Spanish journalist Ildefonso Bermejo, López had a network of police spies whose business was to overhear incautious remarks unflattering to his government. Hence most of the foreign diplomatic corps attracted his ire at one time or another; for example, the French consul was overheard to say that López's wife was an Indian who smoked cigars, and so on. Sometimes diplomatic relations were broken off; at other times harsh notes were exchanged, Paraguay being quick to take offense. According to George Thompson, "López ... got into hot water with all the Powers he had anything to do with. He was of a petulant temper, and disliked foreigners generally, though he treated them well".

Dealing with López called for diplomatic tact and patience; yet the man entrusted with the task was Edward A. Hopkins, whose arrogance began to irritate the President. Hopkins "made no secret of his mission to 'civilize' Paraguay". Thus, according to John Hoyt Williams, he asked to be made an admiral in the Paraguayan navy. He would build a ship to his own design. He and a crew of Americans would sail the ship to Buenos Aires and kidnap dictator Rosas. "All he needed was 100,000 pesos." López was not impressed.

==== The rejection of Hopkins ====
Ill-feeling had been brewing for some time when an incident brought it to a head. One day Hopkins' brother and the wife of the French consul were out riding in the countryside when they encountered three Paraguayan soldiers herding cattle. The soldier in charge ordered the couple to move aside so as not to frighten the animals, but he was ignored and the cattle stampeded. Enraged, the soldier struck Hopkins' brother with the flat of his sword. Whereupon, wrote Professor Ynsfran

Consul Hopkins, instead of lodging a reasonable complaint with the police on behalf of his brother, presented himself in riding boots and flourishing a whip in the hand at the government house, where he was admitted as usual with every consideration, and confronted the president with a shower of vituperations and threats. [Hopkins was a huge, towering man.] The flabbergasted ruler was for the moment speechless. After a few minutes he recovered his calm and dismissed Hopkins with the admonition that if he had any remonstrances he should present them through the proper channel. Hopkins had conjured up his own Nemesis. President López, incensed at this gross conduct, withdrew Hopkins' exequatur, and the latter had no alternative but to leave the country. This meant the shattering of the inchoate emporium of the Rhode Island company.

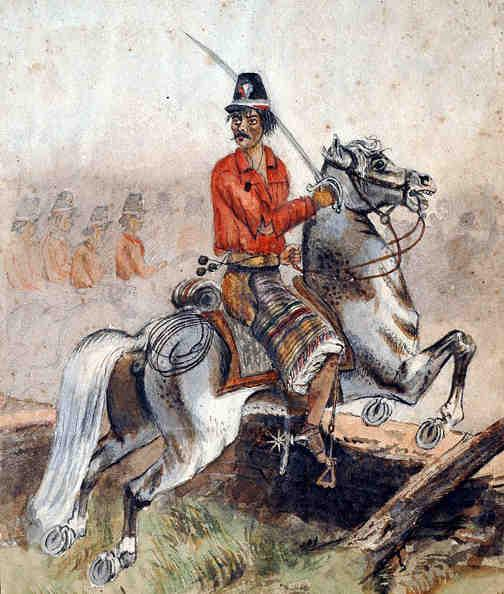
Paraguayan cavalryman (José Ignacio Garmendia, Museo Roca)

A different source found that Hopkins boasted that he "forcibly entered the audience chamber of President López, in his riding dress, whip in hand, despite the remonstrance of the guard".

It was said that López ordered the soldier to receive 300 lashes for exceeding his authority, but Hopkins demanded that Paraguay apologise in its official newspaper El Semanario. The newspaper responded by printing Hopkins' version of the incident in full, according to which the soldier had attacked without any provocation whatsoever: all part of an ongoing, state-inspired campaign of insults against himself and the employees of the Rhode Island company. The newspaper dismissed Hopkins' version as unbelievable. The sentence on the soldier — he had to run the gauntlet of 300 blows — was indeed recorded, but with the detail that it was Hopkins' brother who had provoked him. A later issue denounced Hopkins as an ill-mannered boor, a harsh and oppressive employer; a troublemaker, a fanfarrón (presumptuous braggart), immoral person and drunkard. According to a resident Spanish journalist, Hopkins had demanded that the soldier be shot, but he was only restricted to barracks for a spell.

Hopkins possessed certain documents which he was supposed to deliver up before leaving the country. He refused, and in defiance of López was conveyed out of Paraguay aboard a visiting American vessel USS Water Witch. An infuriated López banned all foreign warships from entering Paraguayan waters. This incident, and the role of Water Witch in further exacerbating American-Paraguayan relations, will be described later.

==== The claims of the Rhode Island company ====
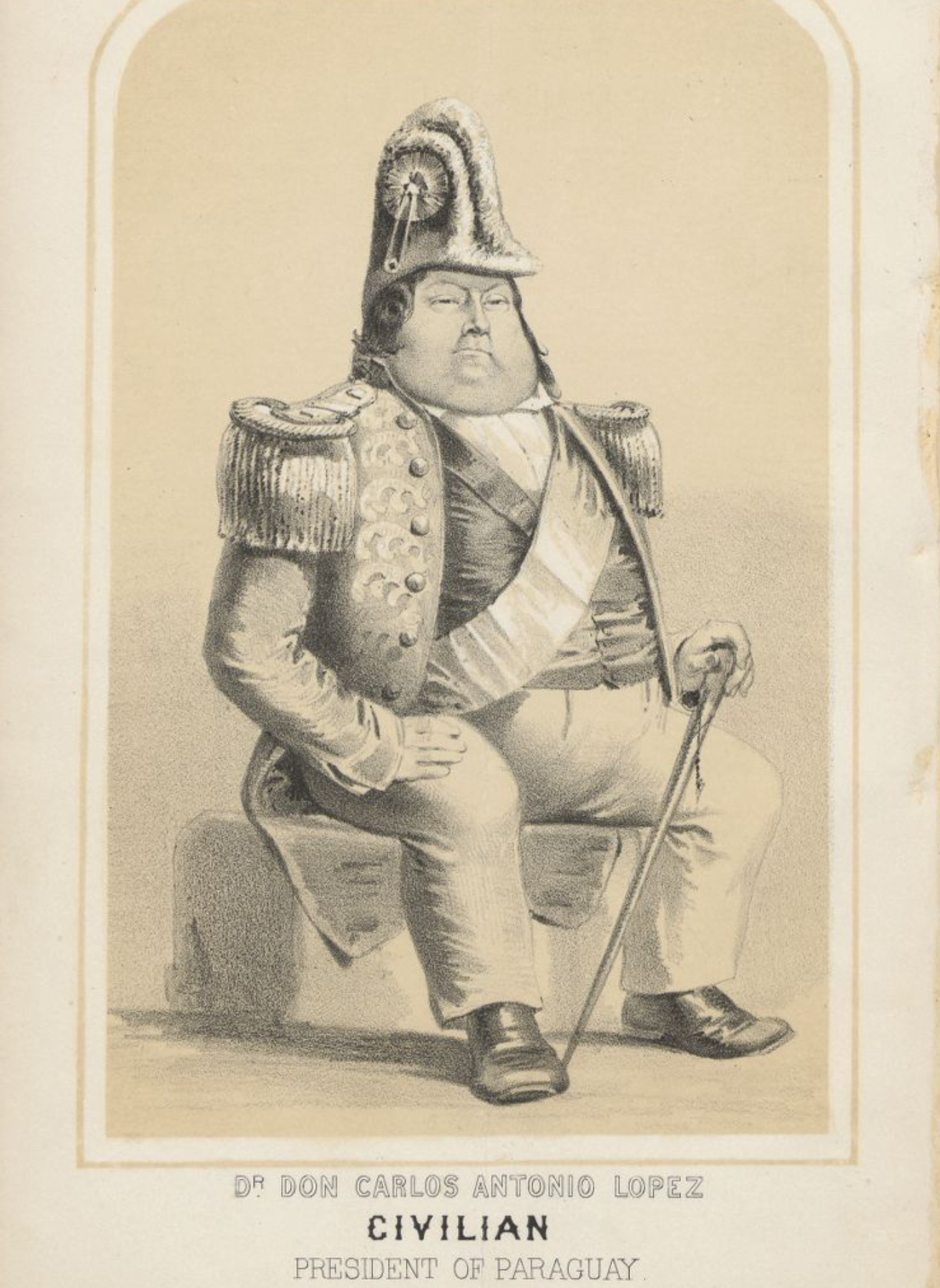
López according to Hopkins. Hopkins' company induced the U.S. government to send the Paraguay expedition.

Back in the United States the company that Hopkins represented got up a claim against Paraguay. This claim was afterwards adjudicated, see below, by a two-person international commission comprising an American and a Paraguayan arbitrator. The arbitrators agreed that the Rhode Island company's claim was worthless. However, this was not determined until August 1860. Meantime, the Rhode Island company started a campaign. It asserted that it had been wronged and damaged by the Republic of Paraguay to an amount in excess of a million dollars. It was in reference to this claim that President Buchanan said Paraguay had "seized and appropriated the property of American citizens residing in Paraguay, in a violent and arbitrary manner".

The company lobbied to get the Paraguay expedition, spending a lot of money to get the joint resolution through Congress, where there was strong opposition.

The Republican Congressional Committee, harsh critics of President Buchanan's administration, said this was the typical behavior of a certain sort of American trader:

It is the game of some of our ill-doing traders among the petty neighboring Republics, and especially among our Indian tribes, to get up difficulties, provoke injuries, and then get the strong hand of our Government to extort indemnities. All the fraudulent claims set up against Mexico, in which our people speculate, are for the most part of this sort, the claimants calculating on the avidity of our contiguous states for acquisition of Mexican territory, and relying, in the event of quarrel between the Governments, that they may get their asserted demands paid out of the United States Treasury, as so much in liquidation of the amount to be paid for ceded territory. It is so with Indian annuities, which are often swallowed up in indemnities. Hopkins is not too scrupulous to be an expert in this mode of speculation ...

==== Summary ====
The claim by the Rhode Island company that they were arbitrarily ruined by the Paraguayan government, later adjudicated as worthless, was, therefore, one of the three official causes for sending the Paraguay expedition.

=== Refusing to ratify the friendship treaty ===
Paraguay had a history of feeling disrespected by its larger neighbors Brazil and Argentina` and welcomed recognition by third countries. Recently, in 1853, Paraguay had negotiated treaties of friendship, commerce and navigation with Great Britain, France, Sardinia and the United States, and looked forward to the ratification of the latter by the U.S. Senate. These four treaties were almost word-for-word the same, and contained most favored nation clauses.

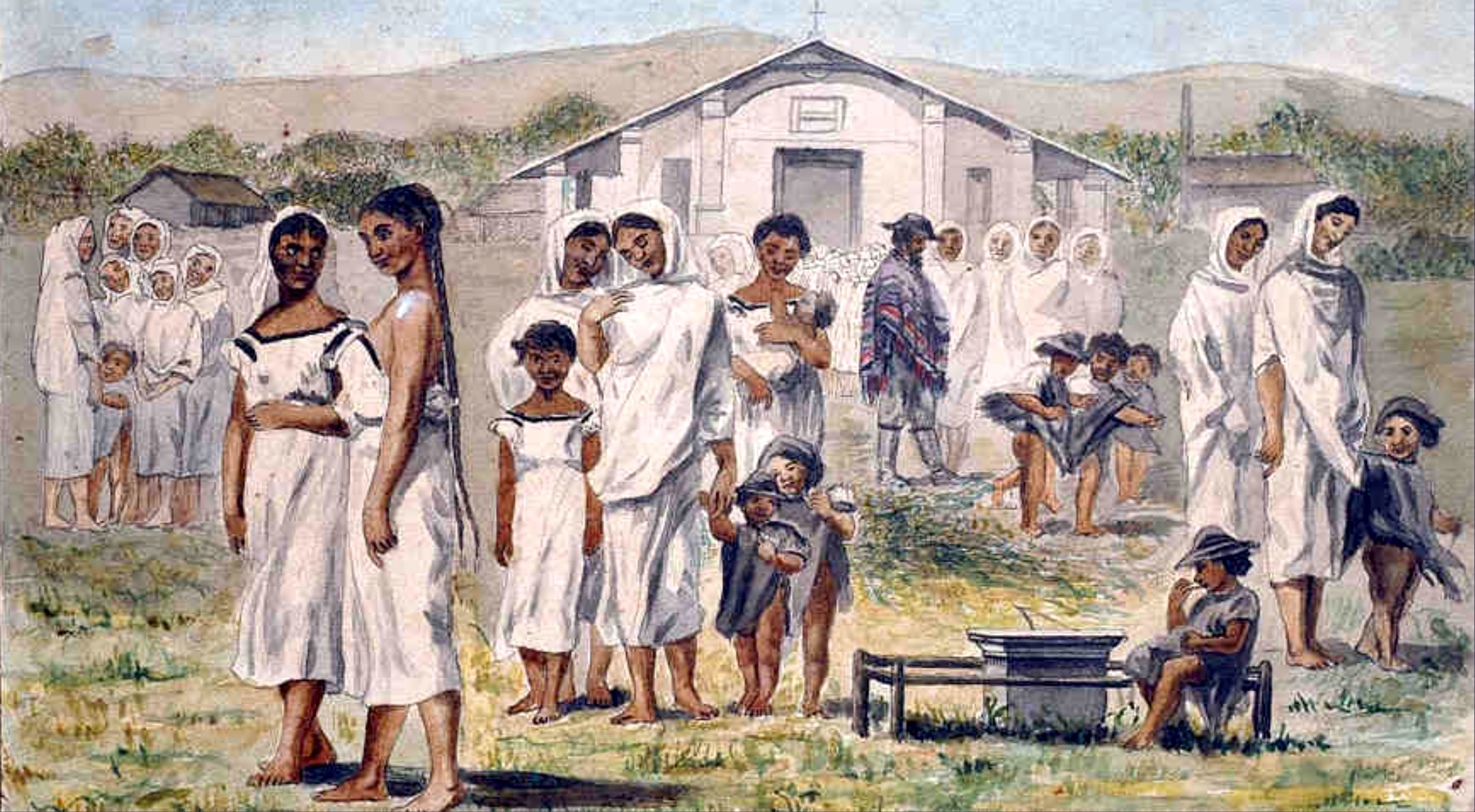
Country churchgoers, Villarrica, Paraguay (José Ignacio Garmendia, Museo Roca)

Owing to the haste of a visiting American diplomat, many formal mistakes got into the wording of the U.S.-Paraguay treaty, e.g. the U.S.A. was referred to as "United States of North America"; so the U.S. Senate required these be corrected. A corrected version was prepared for Paraguay to ratify. By the time the document arrived in South America consul Hopkins had departed, and no American diplomat was available to formally present it to the Paraguayan government. So the responsibility was given to Lieutenant Thomas Jefferson Page, commander of USS Water Witch

Following the Hopkins incident in which he was conveyed out of Paraguay by USS Water Witch (September 1854), an angry President López was in no mood to ratify, and Water Witch had been banned from Paraguayan waters. Lieutenant Page sent an officer to Asunción by commercial steamer to hand-deliver the corrected version of the treaty. However, an upset Paraguayan government refused to receive it because it was not in Spanish.

==== Summary ====
Buchanan complained Paraguay refused to ratify the treaty "on frivolous and even insulting pretexts". But strictly speaking Paraguay was not bound to ratify a document not in its national language; more to the point, it was not bound to ratify a treaty of friendship at all; still less, if there was not friendship enough. The upshot, however, was that while France, Great Britain and Sardinia had gained commercial and navigation advantages, the United States had yet to do so.

That, then, was another of the three reasons Buchanan gave for sending the Paraguay expedition.

=== USS Water Witch ===
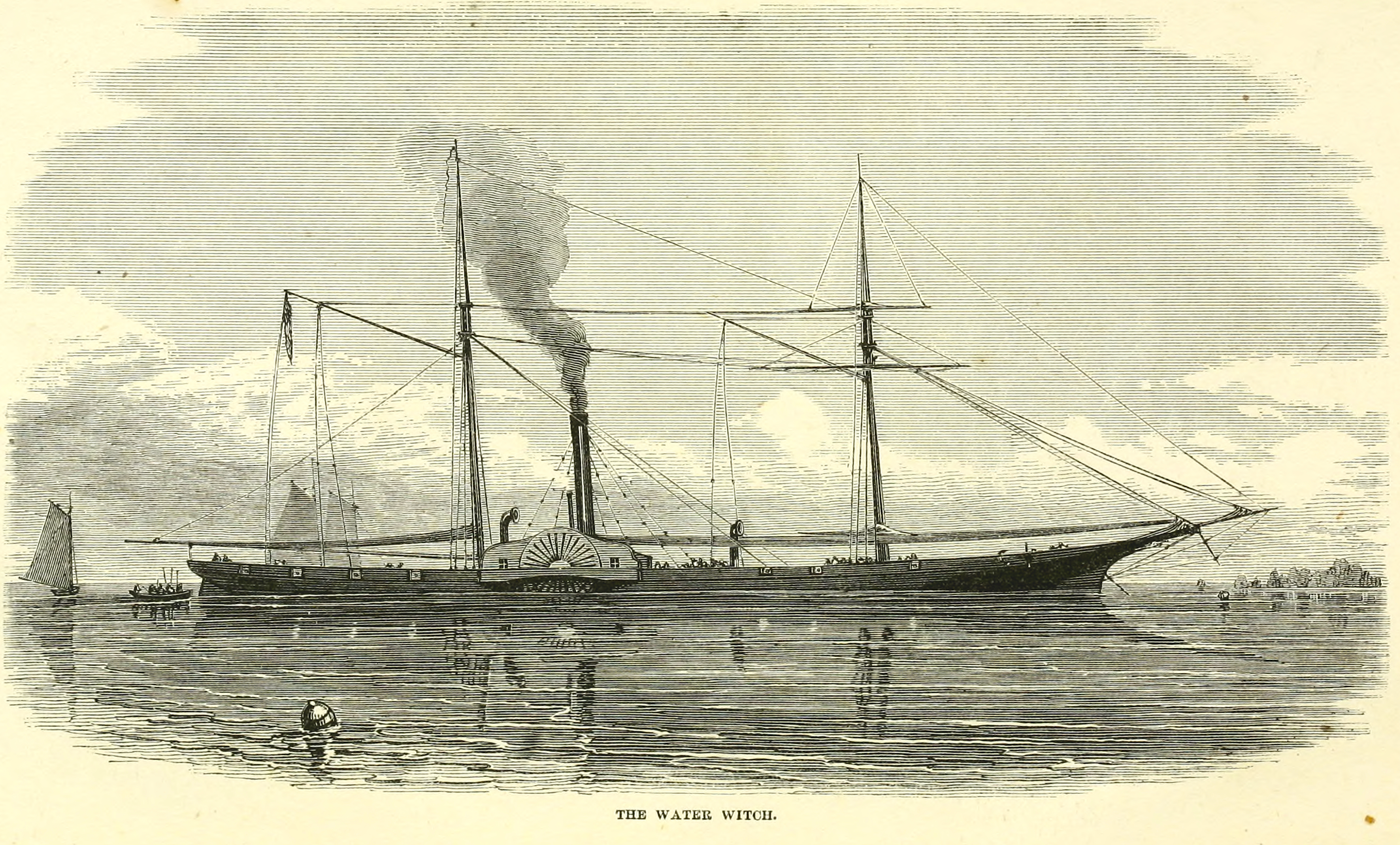
USS Water Witch, explorer of the rivers of the Platine basin

Water Witch was a ship of the United States Navy that explored the rivers of the River Plate basin. These rivers drain an area of land equal to one-fourth of the surface of South America. Amongst the most important are the Paraná River and the Paraguay River. They are accessible through Argentine territory.

In 1852 dictator Rosas — who used to block access to them — was overthrown and his successor Justo José de Urquiza opened the rivers of Argentina to free navigation by the ships of all nations. The United States therefore decided to send Water Witch on an expedition of scientific exploration, intended to encourage commerce and enhance American prestige.

USS Water Witch was the best vessel for this role. Launched in 1852, she had a wooden hull 150 foot long, a 22-foot beam, and drew only 7 feet 10 inches, important for navigating rivers that were liable to shoal. She carried an experimental propulsion system (Morgan eccentric feathering paddle wheels). Rigged as a topsail schooner, she was armed with three small bronze howitzers.

There had been steamships on these rivers before, and in 1846 the French paddle-steamer Fulton had reached the Paraguayan capital. But that was part of an extensive Anglo-French naval expedition with appropriate logistical support. Water Witch showed that, with local cooperation, a single steamship could peacefully navigate these rivers fuelled by local firewood (a good substitute for coal) at a cost of only two dollars an hour. The voyage to Asunción could be made in days: sailing ships could take months.

She was commanded by Lieutenant Thomas Jefferson Page USN, who afterward wrote an accessible account of her voyages. Born into one of the First Families of Virginia, his grandfather had signed the Declaration of Independence. However, Page was wanting in tact, and was no diplomat. In touchy Paraguay misunderstandings could occur, yet according to the southern gentleman honor code, insult literally could not be tolerated.

==== President López welcomes USS Water Witch ====
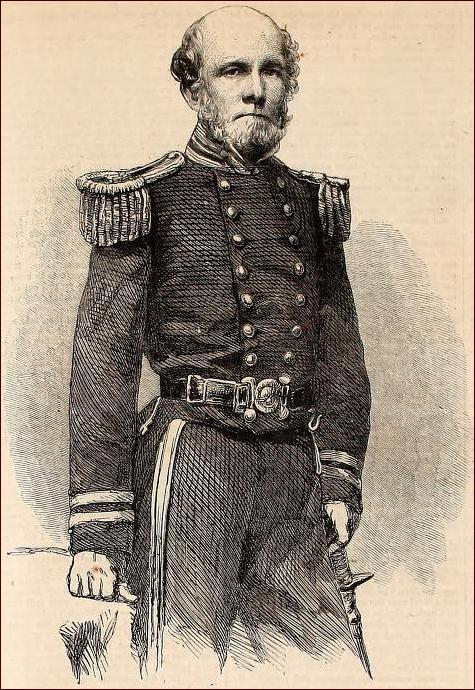
Lieutenant Thomas Jefferson Page USN, commander of USS Water Witch

Water Witch arrived at Asunción in October 1853. At this time consul Hopkins had only been in Paraguay a few months and was still on good terms with President López.

Lieutenant Page wrote that López received them very well, concluding

the reception of the expedition in his waters, and his entire course towards us, until his outbreak with [consul Edward Hopkins], was characterized throughout by generous hospitality.

Since Paraguay sought American friendship, it was understandable.

==== First dent in American-Paraguayan relations ====
Page wanted to take Water Witch up the Paraguay River into the Mato Grosso, owned by Brazil, and applied to López for permission. However, there was a highly sensitive political situation that perhaps Page did not fully understand:

Paraguay had a tense relationship with the Empire of Brazil; the two countries had a 300-year old, shifting boundary dispute going back deep into colonial times. Where Paraguay ended and Brazil began was strongly disputed, and had led to firefights. Paraguay considered that Brazilian settlers from the Mato Grosso were continually encroaching into and appropriating Paraguayan territory, yet López could not persuade Brazil to sign a definitive boundary agreement. He felt very bitter about this. López feared to make a precedent whereby Brazil would demand the right to navigate via the River Paraguay into the Mato Grosso.

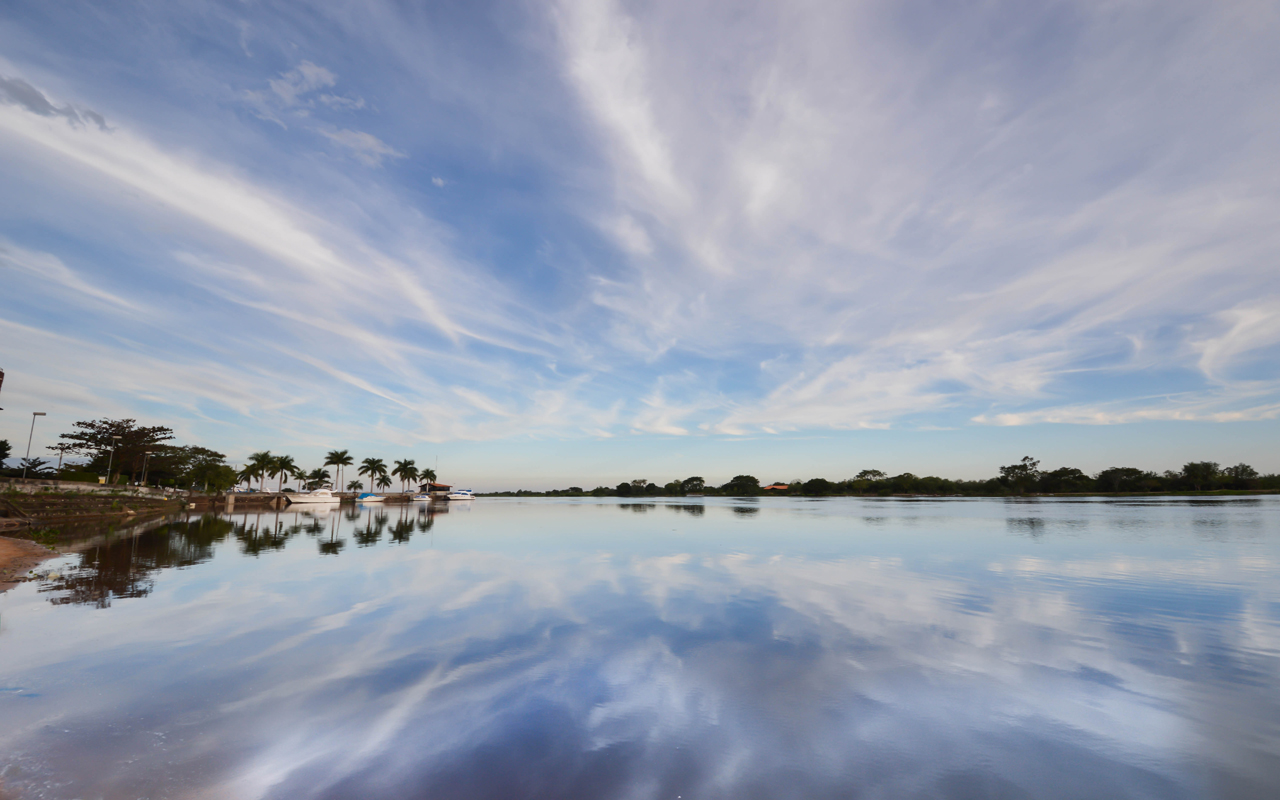
Paraguay River, a 1,600-mile waterway in the heart of South America

What was really at issue was Lopez's fears that free navigation would lead to an enormous Brazilian buildup in the Mato Grosso which would threaten Paraguay militarily, and, through its commercial impact on the North, would especially increase smuggling. It would seem that López had an almost morbid premonition that formal war with Brazil was on the cards.

Accordingly, López issued Lieutenant Page with a passport to explore the Paraguay River up to a certain point which he considered Paraguayan territory; but no further. When Water Witch arrived there, however, Page persuaded himself he could ignore López's prohibition and he pushed on deep into Brazilian territory. Scientifically, this was interesting; politically, reckless. Page established his 450-ton ship could steam up to Corumbá in the Mato Grosso, 1,870 miles (3,010 km) from Buenos Aires, further than had ever been done before; his achievement opened up the Mato Grosso to steam navigation (far and away the best means of access to the province); but he upset López.

Although López tried to be polite about it, it was a dent in American-Paraguayan relations. López no longer trusted Page.

López's pessimism turned out to be well founded. Brazil soon demanded the right to navigate the Upper Paraguay river, threatening war if it did not get it. It went on to establish a steamship line to the Mato Grosso. Over time the navigation of the river became a political necessity for the Brazilian Empire; disputes over it were one of the causes of the subsequent Paraguayan War.

Opening up the Mato Grosso

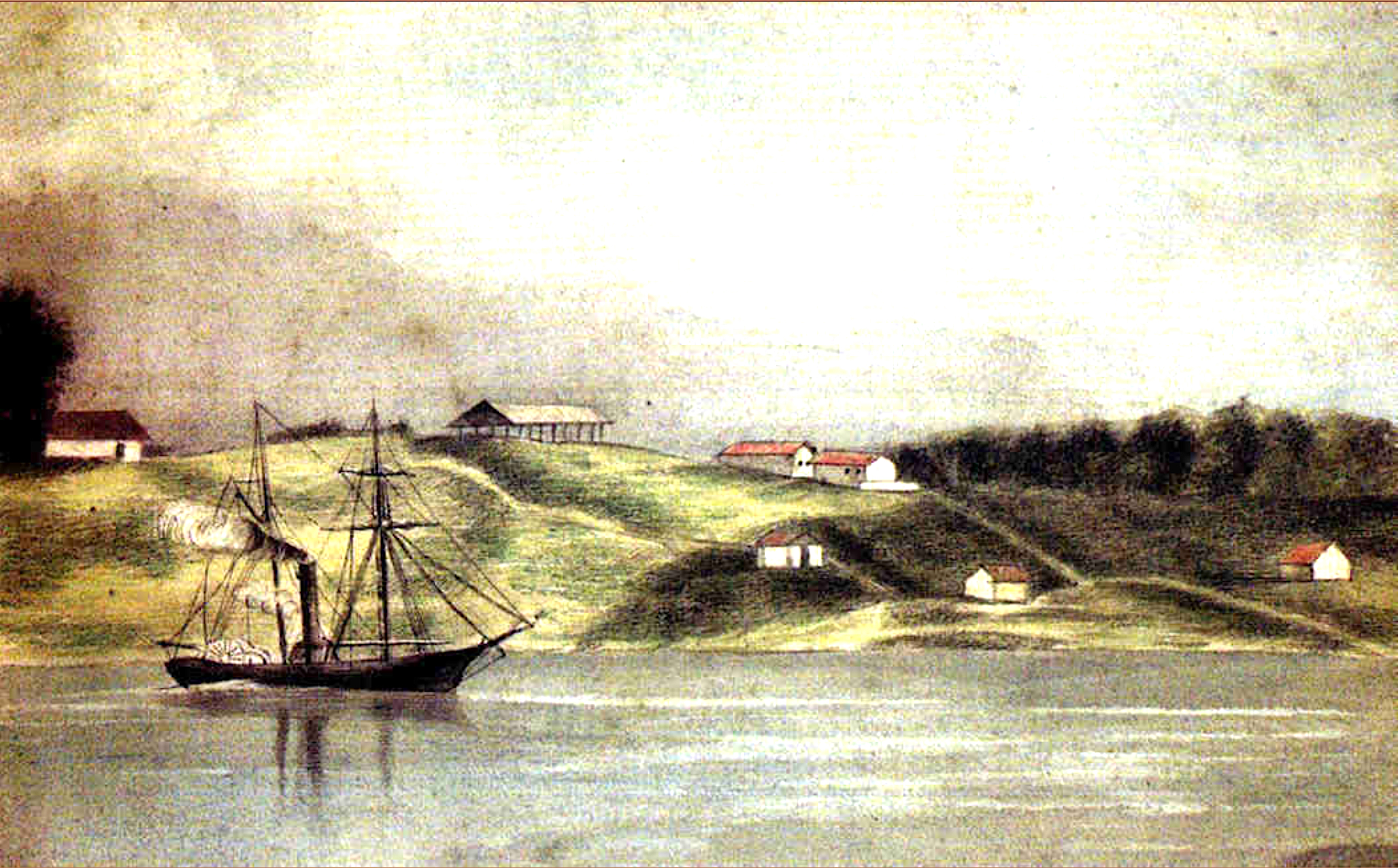
1. Corumbá, 1853, arrival of USS Water Witch

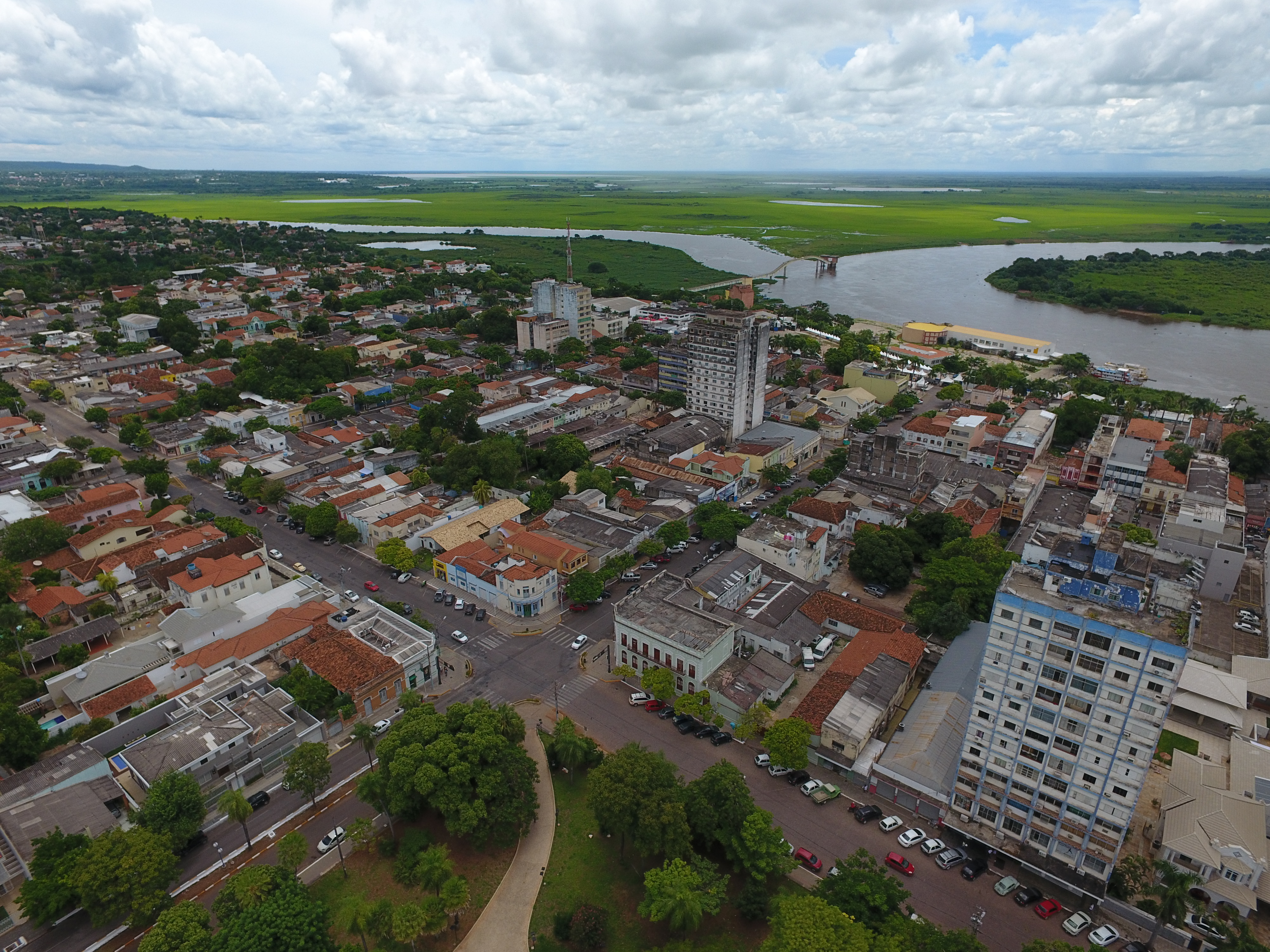
2. Corumbá today viewed by drone

1. Water Witch proved a steamship could reach Corumbá, nearly 2,000 miles from the sea. Brazil was keen to encourage immigration into the region. This was a security worry for Paraguay, however.
2. Water Witch's achievement opened up the Mato Grosso to steam navigation, greatly developing the remote region.

==== Edward Hopkins again; Water Witch trains her guns on the presidential palace ====
In September 1854 President López informed Lieutenant Page that Edward Hopkins was no longer accepted as U.S. Consul in Paraguay. The Rhode Island company could send another representative and that would be fine, but Paraguay would have no more dealings with Hopkins.

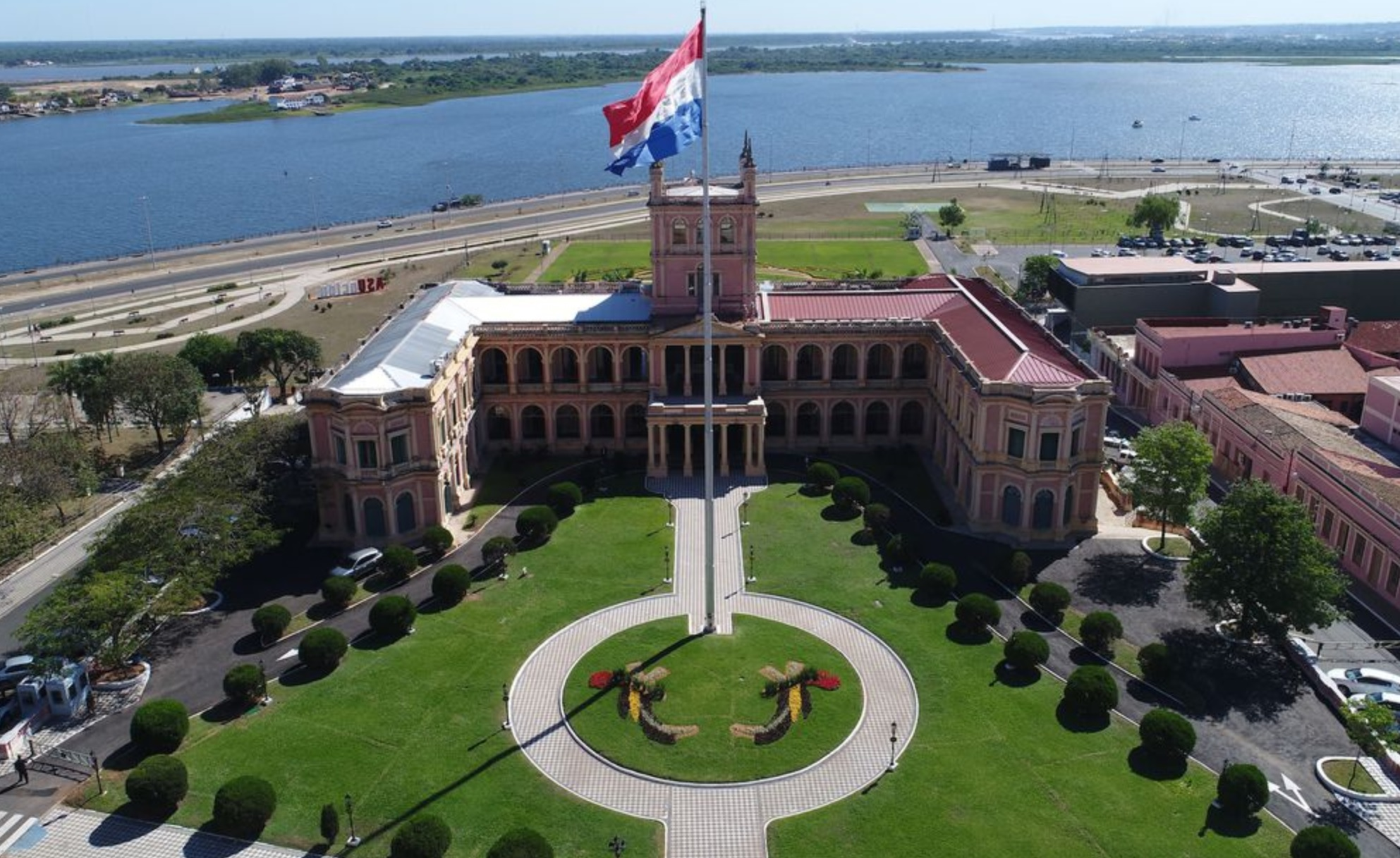
The presidial palace (Palacio de los López) today, Paraguay river in background

As mentioned, Hopkins had in his possession certain papers he was supposed to deliver up and López refused to let him leave the country until he did so. Lieutenant Page, although he had a very poor opinion of Hopkins (the contempt was mutual), decided he ought to help a fellow American, and applied for the necessary permits. However, the Paraguayan government and Page got into a prickly dispute about the paperwork, the government insisting all applications had to be made in Spanish, which language Page refused to use. So Page defied López and removed Hopkins from Paraguay anyway in USS Water Witch.

This raised López's animosity, since the implication was that Water Witch, a guest of Paraguay, was prepared to fight its way out of the country to remove a person defying the Paraguayan government. It seems that each side thought the other might be planning on violence, and Water Witch trained her guns on the presidential palace. A furious López responded by banning all foreign vessels of war from Paraguayan waters. (It was why he refused to ratify the U.S.-Paraguay treaty of friendship, above).

==== Fort Itapirú fires on USS Water Witch ====
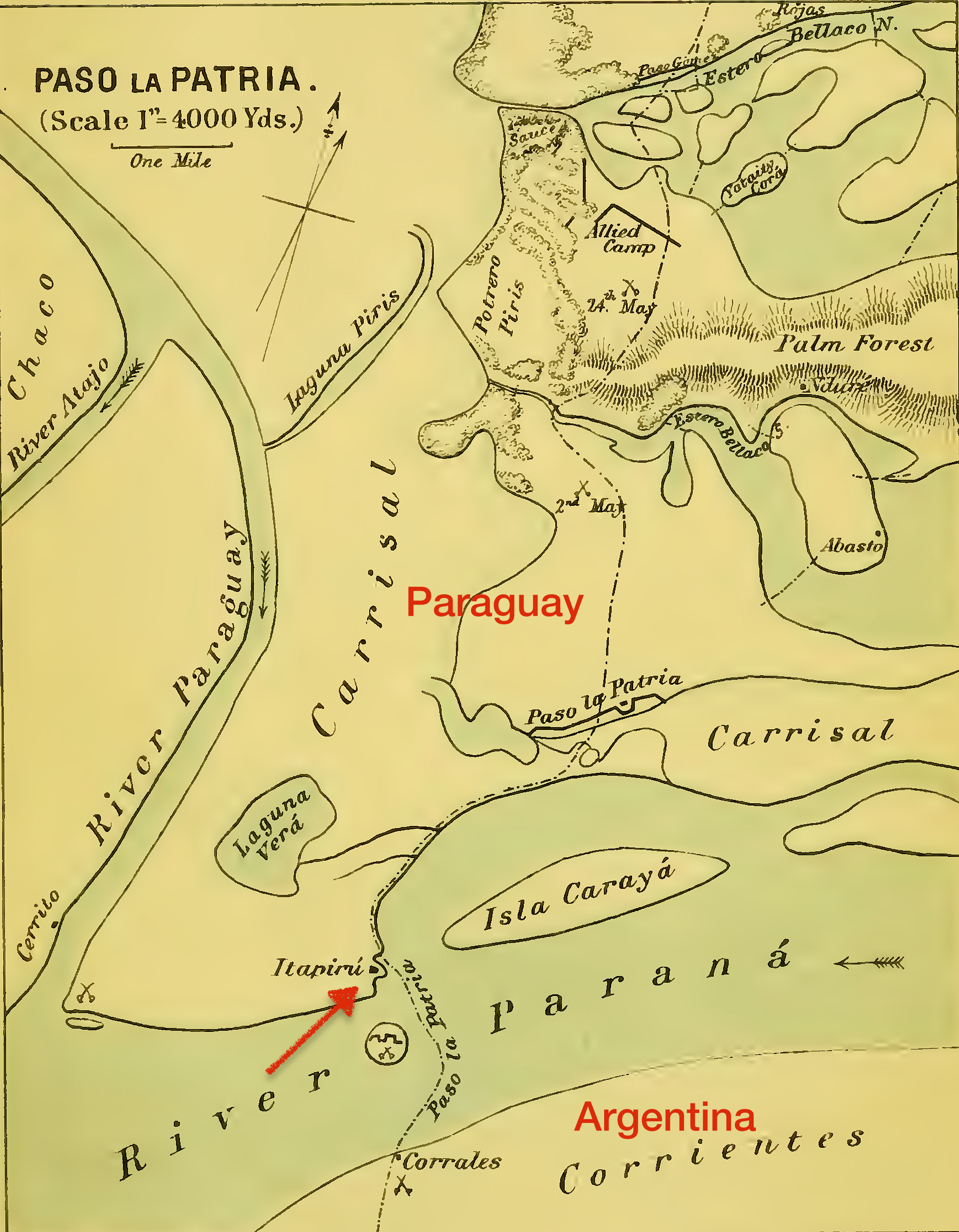
Fort Itapirú on the Upper Paraná river, and the Canal Privado behind Carayá island (Thompson, 1869)

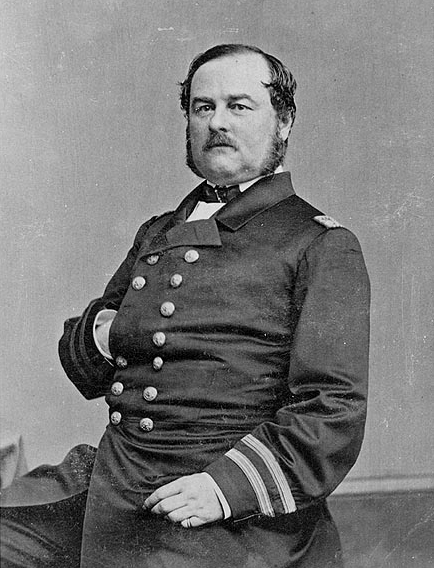
Lt. William Jeffers, who defied Fort Itapirú

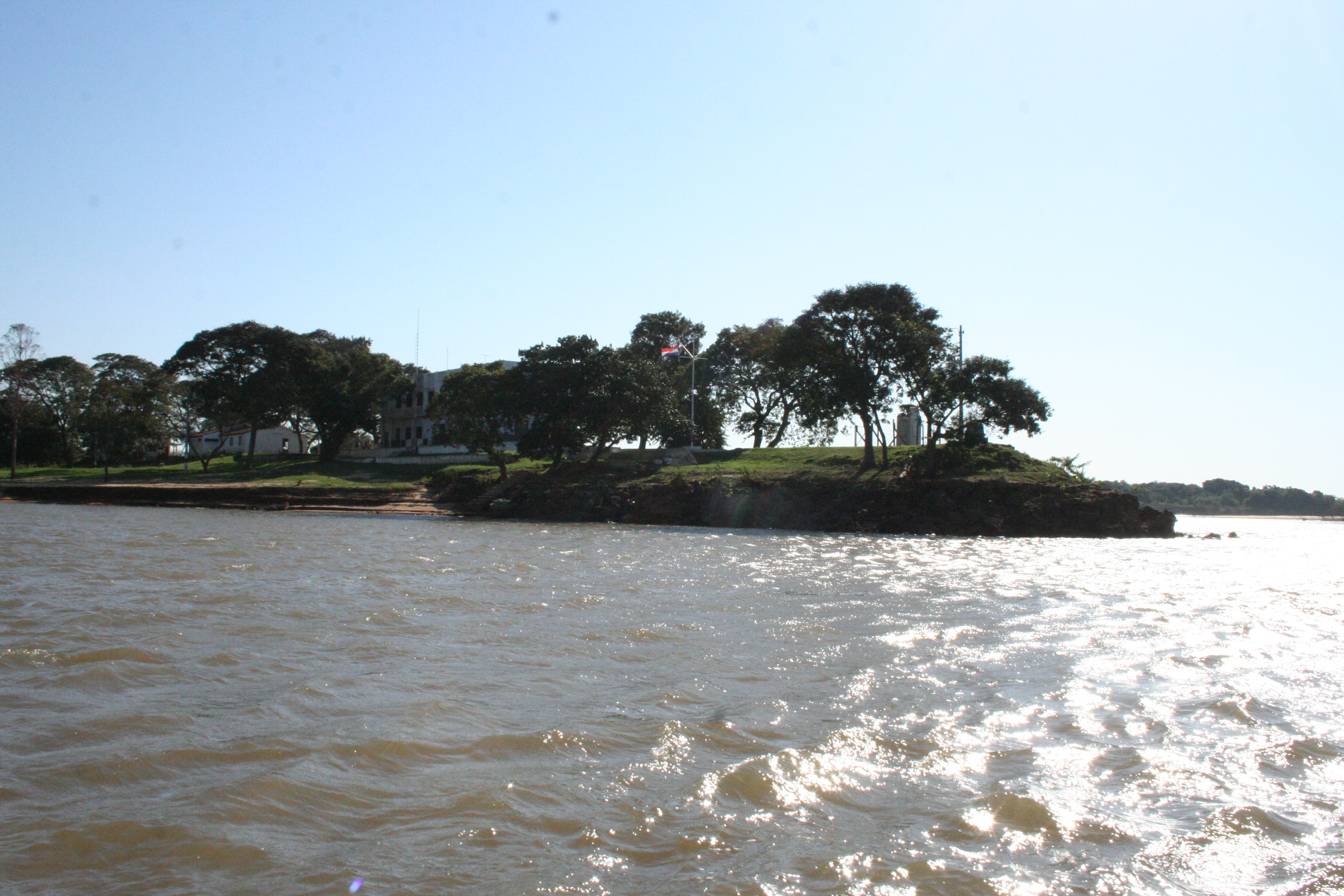
Itapirú fort today, Upper Paraná. The remains of the old brick fort, destroyed in the War of the Triple Alliance, can just be discerned under the flagstaff.

USS Water Witch incident
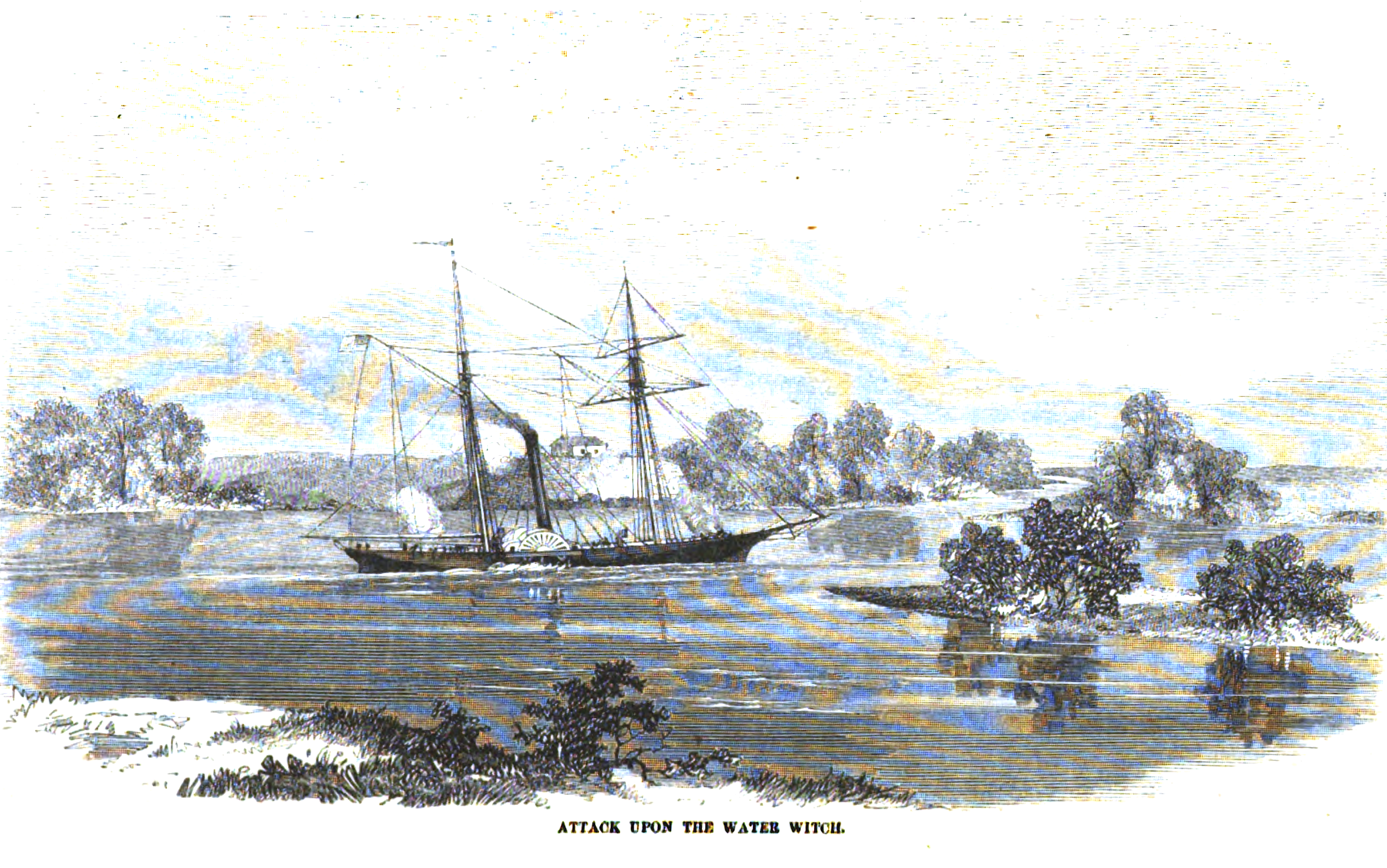
- USS Water Witch is fired on by Fort Itapirú for trespassing in Paraguayan territorial waters (1 February 1855)
Date	1 February 1855
Location	Paraná River, Paraguay
Result	Paraguay expedition

Belligerents
United States	Paraguay

Commanders and leaders
Lieutenant William Nicholson Jeffers	Vicente Duarte

Strength
1 steamer	1 fort

Casualties and losses
1 killed 1 steamer disabled	

In January 1855, while Water Witch was in Argentine waters, Lieutenant Page led off a small expedition to explore an Argentine river, leaving his executive officer, Lieutenant William Nicholson Jeffers, in charge of the ship, with orders to explore the Upper Paraná river.

The Upper Paraná flows west until it encounters the Paraguay River, when it turns south and is called the Lower Paraná. The Upper Paraná — which Jeffers was to explore — was (and is) an international boundary between Argentina and Paraguay, and at that time was at least two miles wide.

A few miles upstream the Upper Paraná there was a long island called Carayá that divided the river into two channels. The southern channel was international, but so far as Paraguay was concerned the northern channel, called the Canal Privado was in Paraguayan territorial waters, was indeed a sensitive military zone.

The reason was that, mostly, the Paraguayan coast was swampy and not easily invaded, but an exception occurred around the village of Paso de Patria, where there was a firm beach where a landing could be made. (Indeed, in the later War of the Triple Alliance, an island neighboring Carayá island was actually used by Brazilian forces to invade Paraguay, being the scene of the battle of Purutué Bank.) This vulnerable spot was defended by a military camp at Paso de Patria, and the entrance to the channel was protected by a Paraguayan fort called Itapirú. The map, drawn by colonel George Thompson of the Paraguayan army just few years later for another purpose, shows the scene.

Itapirú was only a small semicircular brick fort, but it had six large cannon, and its gunners were accurate. Ten years later, in the War of the Triple Alliance, the fort defied a strong Brazilian naval force for 40 days.

On 1 February 1855 USS Water Witch, Lieutenant Jeffers, carrying an Argentine pilot, approached Fort Itapirú where it guarded the Canal Privado. He must have known he was risking confrontation, because he moved the starboard gun to the port side, cleared for action, and ordered forty shrapnel, twelve regular shells, and thirty stand of grape prepared. He knew López had banned foreign warships from Paraguayan waters — with Water Witch in mind — and he was carrying a pilot who knew the river. His excuse was that he had tried to go through the main channel but had run on a sandbar. Two sources speculate that the move was probably a calculated insult to López. It was, at least, bad timing, because there was a tense political situation: Paraguay was expecting an invasion by a large Brazilian fleet.

At about 1:20 pm the fort sent a Paraguayan canoe alongside and a man offered Jeffers a copy of López's decree banning foreign vessels. Jeffers refused to accept it on the ground that it was in Spanish. Jeffers did this, not because there was nobody on board who knew Spanish — there was — but in retaliation for Paraguay's earlier refusal to receive the friendship treaty in English. Thus Jeffers was navigating in waters claimed by Paraguay while refusing to communicate with its officials. When within 300 yards of the fort Jeffers received a hail in Spanish. "Not understanding", he continued.

According to Jeffers, the fort then fired two blank shots, followed by a live round. The live shot killed the helmsman, Samuel Chaney. Water Witch retaliated with her three howitzers, but apparently did little damage. His way ahead uncertain because of a risk of grounding, Jeffers reversed course and ran the gauntlet again. The fort hulled Water Witch ten times, destroyed two boats and damaged a paddle wheel. Water Witch limped into an Argentine port.

Water Witch's armament was only three bronze howitzers, carried as protection against hostile indigenous people. She had not been designed to take on a fort armed with heavy caliber artillery. For twenty minutes Jeffers and his crew were in danger of their lives. According to Jeffers "The [Paraguayan] fire was slow but remarkably well directed". He also reported that some American gunners deserted from their quarters. According to the Paraguayan military report they abandoned their guns and fled below deck; when the ship ceased firing, so did the fort. Several gunners were afterwards court-martialed for deserting while under fire.

When Lieutenant Page found out about it he went downriver and tried to persuade Commodore William D. Salter, commander of the U.S. squadron in South America, to give him orders to attack the fort. Salter refused, and referred it to Washington.

According to the official Paraguayan military report, published in the country's newspaper, the fort sent an officer to warn Water Witch she was not allowed to enter the Canal Privado, handing her commander a copy of López's decree; but he rudely threw it back, saying he had nothing to do with any Paraguayan, and was going to go ahead anyway. Further, that three warning blank shots were fired, but the ship's crew laughed loudly, ridiculing the fort's gunnery; nor did they respond to three verbal hails.

==== Assessment ====
Back in the U.S., Lieutenant Page claimed the Paraguayan fort had fired at Water Witch without provocation while she was in international waters. Lieutenant Jeffers claimed he was never in the Canal Privado. Modern scholars have not been persuaded, and neither was Secretary of State William L. Marcy, who found Page and Jeffers directly responsible for the Water Witch incident. It appears Marcy interviewed Water Witch's hospital steward who confirmed the Paraguayan version of the incident.

In late 1856 the U.S. sent special agent Richard Fitzpatrick to Paraguay to try to get the friendship treaty ratified, without even mentioning Water Witch; he was rebuffed.

In any case, the incident was provoked by a junior naval officer who should have known he was risking armed confrontation with a fort under orders to interdict foreign vessels, and with which he refused to parley. President Buchanan claimed that López's navigation prohibition did not apply to USS Water Witch because she was not a vessel of war, just a scientific research vessel, ignoring that USS Water Witch came to the fort stripped for action with her ammunition on deck.

==== Summary ====
That the Paraguayan fort had fired on Water Witch without justification may seem improbable in light of the above. This, then, was the other of the three official causes for sending the Paraguay expedition.

=== Incompetent diplomacy ===
In less than six months an accumulation of diplomatic altercations had produced a full-fledged dispute that would almost to lead to war. In summary, the sequence of mistakes leading to the breakdown in relations was: (1) a diplomat failing to proof-read an international treaty; (2) while a guest of Paraguay and in defiance of its government, insensitively steaming into Brazil; (3) the inappropriate behavior of consul Hopkins; (4) defiantly taking Hopkins and documents away in an U.S. warship; (5) using Lieutenant Page in the sensitive matter of the unratified treaty; (6) defying Fort Itapirú. These things might have been avoided if both sides had had a competent diplomatic service to untangle misunderstandings in good time, but they did not.

==== Paraguay ====
López has been described as "an egotist who refused to maintain an adequate diplomatic service". Paraguay had a minister of foreign relations in Asunción, but he was a mere figurehead: López did not even allow his foreign ministers to open diplomatic correspondence. López had no representatives abroad "and did not care to get information about the outside world".

At various times López was troubled by foreign envoys (e.g. Hopkins) who were exceeding their instructions. He did not know to take the elementary precaution of requiring them to produce their diplomatic credentials.

==== United States ====
At that time there was no professional Foreign Service. Congress begrudged the cost of the diplomatic establishment. Until 1856, appointments in the American diplomatic and consular services were unsalaried; therefore, the financial incentive to apply for a post (if any) was the opportunity to make money in a foreign country. Diplomatic and consular appointments were made on the spoils system; too often, the quality was poor. In Latin America the U.S. was represented in some countries, not in others.

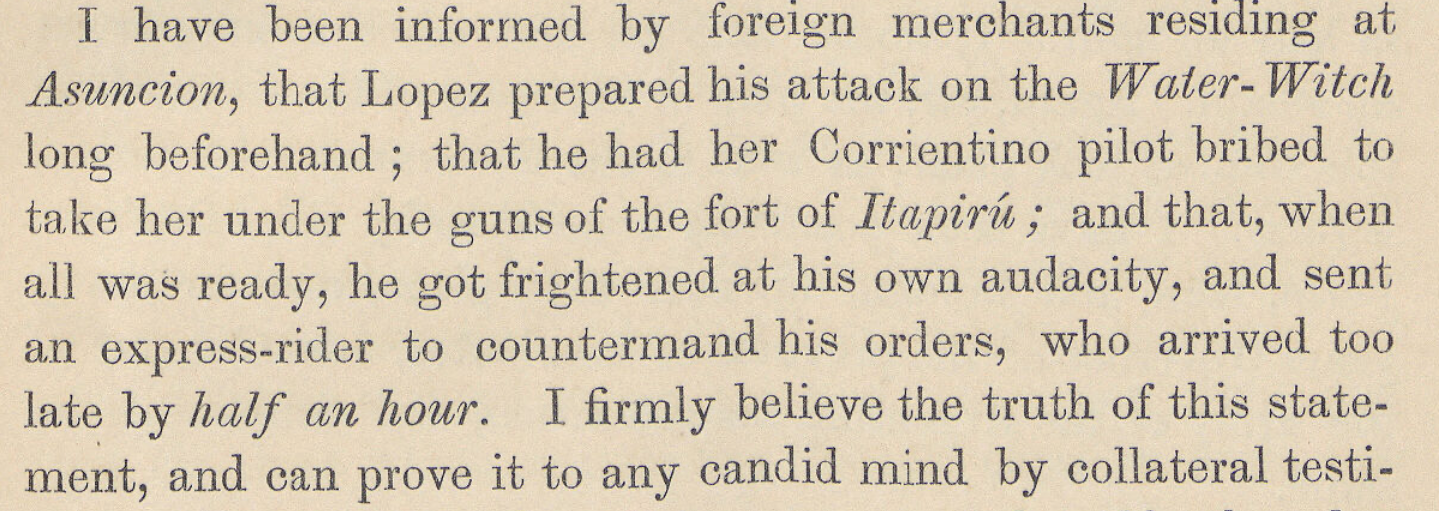
Edward A. Hopkins' memorial to President Buchanan (1858). Hopkins often found reality "too cumbersome" to bear.

Until consul Hopkins arrived the United States did not have any kind of representation in Asunción. When it had needed to, it sent a diplomat from Buenos Aires. The quality of this part-time representation could be poor. The mistakes that got into the U.S.-Paraguay treaty of friendship did so because of the carelessness of one of those visitors, who cannot have proof-read the document. Hopkins, the first U.S. consul, got the post because nobody else applied. After he left the job of representing America was given to Lieutenant Page, effectively a persona non grata in Paraguay, who was anyway a junior naval officer with no diplomatic aptitude. In one assessment, "The dispatch of a strong American task force to bring Paraguay to book was the culmination of fifteen years of diplomatic futility".

== President Buchanan's motives ==
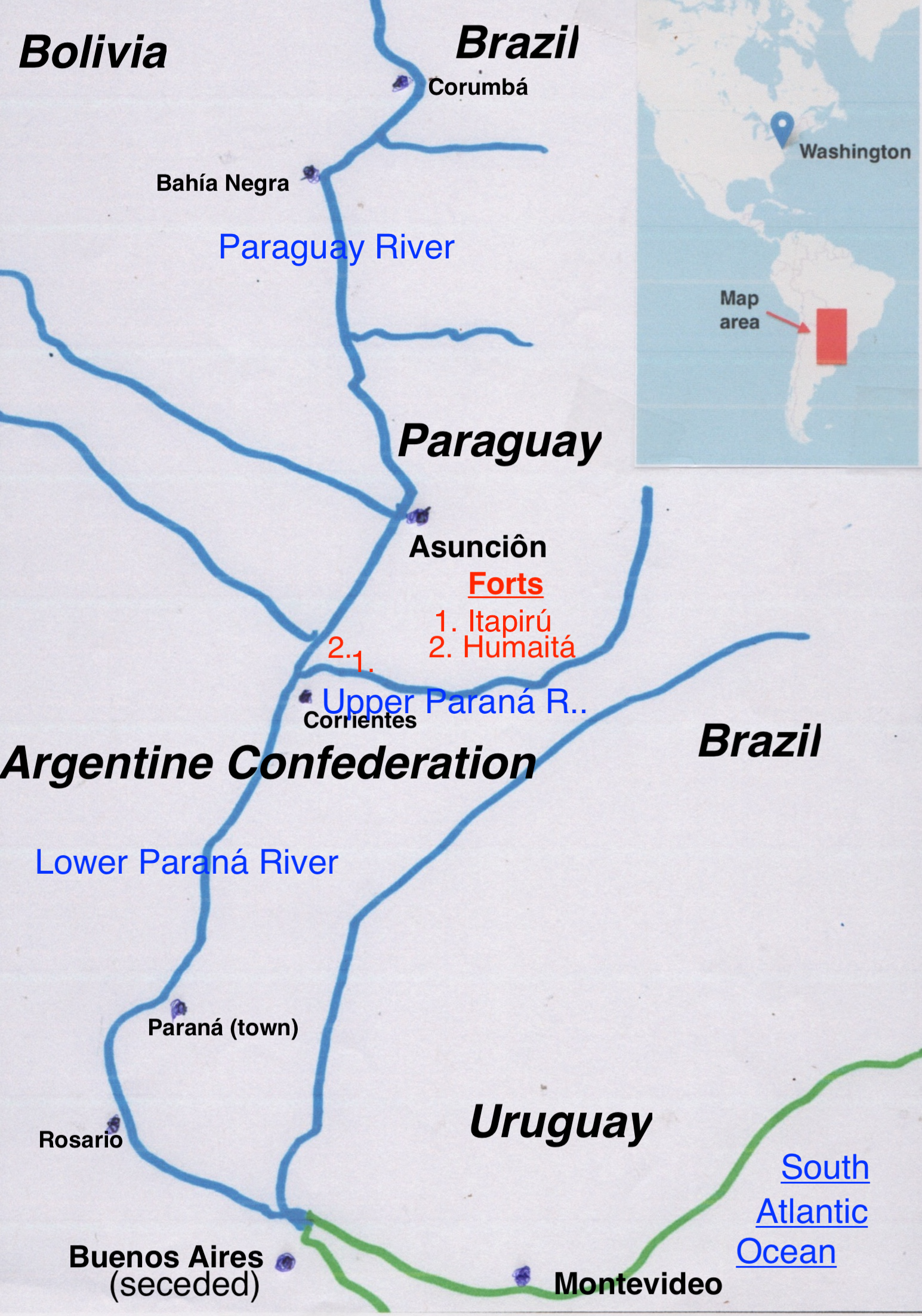
Towns, rivers and forts mentioned in this article

There was no public pressure for action against Paraguay; newspaper coverage was sparse and, if anything, adverse to Hopkins and Page. The Water Witch incident was almost forgotten in public consciousness when, three years later, it was suddenly revived by President Buchanan in his first annual message to Congress.

It is not certain that Buchanan himself believed his complaints were valid. He personally knew something about Hopkins' track record; he presumably knew that Secretary of State Marcy had thought Lieutenant Jeffers was probably to blame for the Fort Itapirú incident; and it could be guessed why President López might be unwilling to ratify a treaty of friendship. Yet the Paraguay expedition was despatched "without bothering about a real investigation of the rather complicated antecedents of the trouble". Several authors have thought Buchanan had an ulterior motive. "The reason for the sending of the expedition plainly lies outside the scope of American-Paraguayan relations".

=== Ulterior motive theories ===
One theory is that Buchanan sent the Paraguay expedition to distract American public opinion from the domestic problems that plagued his presidency. "Stymied on the domestic front, Buchanan looked to the foreign policy area... President Buchanan hoped to restore national unity by sending a large fleet to Paraguay to gain redress for alleged wrongs done to American honor. That did not occur and the nation ultimately descended into a brutal civil war. Another interpretation is that Buchanan wanted to demonstrate that "the United States had the will and the power to enforce the Monroe Doctrine". Still another is that the expedition was sent for a wider purpose, the protection of American commerce in that part of the world. The New York Times said:

[I]t is upon all the Spanish-American States that this demonstration will have a salutary effect. They will now learn, once for all, that our patience is exhausted... After this expedition shall have achieved its object, it will immediately become apparent that our people, scattered throughout the length and breadth of Spanish America, are more respected... We shall hear no more of massacres, as at Panama—of murders, at Nicaragua—of wholesale robberies, as in Mexico and Peru...

Yet another theory is that Buchanan was out to reassure an important body of supporters: Southern plantocrats who feared the U.S. was going soft on plans to establish slave territories in South America.

The Republican Congressional Committee claimed that "Mr Buchanan's war on Paraguay was not for glory, but to furnish means of corruption". They said the Paraguay expedition was an opportunity to dispense political patronage; several examples were given.

A more sinister theory held that Buchanan was a dupe of Southern conspirators who meant to weaken the United States by "withdrawing from the forts and arsenals of the North all the munitions of war, thus leaving them unprovided with arms whenever the plans for the Great Rebellion should be matured".

=== Precedents ===
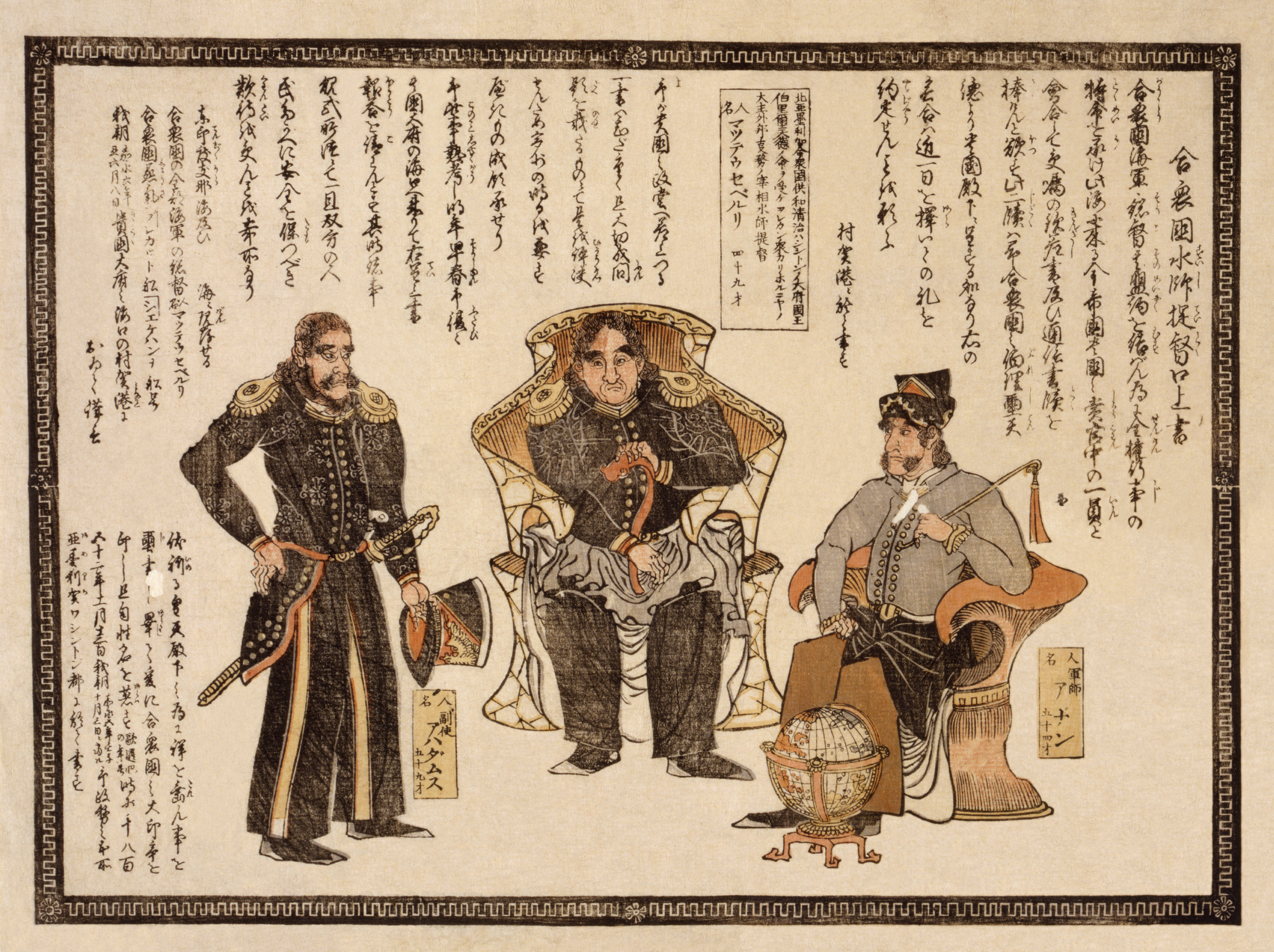
Buchanan may have meant to emulate the earlier Perry Expedition which had 'opened up' Japan

The Water Witch expedition to South America was one of several in which units of the Navy had been ordered to explore and open up parts of the world to intercourse with the United States. The most famous of these today is the Perry Expedition (1852-3 and 1854–5) which, under the presidencies of Millard Fillmore and Franklin Pierce, had "opened up" Japan, until then a country which had kept itself in strict isolation. The Perry Expedition had threatened force in 1853 and the divided Japanese leadership had decided to accept America's demands. Paraguay, thanks to its traditional isolation, had a reputation as an "inland Japan"; but Hopkins, the Rhode Island company and Page publicised the theory that Paraguay had more to offer than Japan. Buchanan may have wanted to emulate the achievement of his predecessors. (One of the vessels of the Perry Expedition, the Supply, was used on the Paraguay expedition.)

== The expedition ==
The Paraguay expedition consisted of two functions: the naval force, and an accompanying diplomatic mission.

=== The naval arm ===
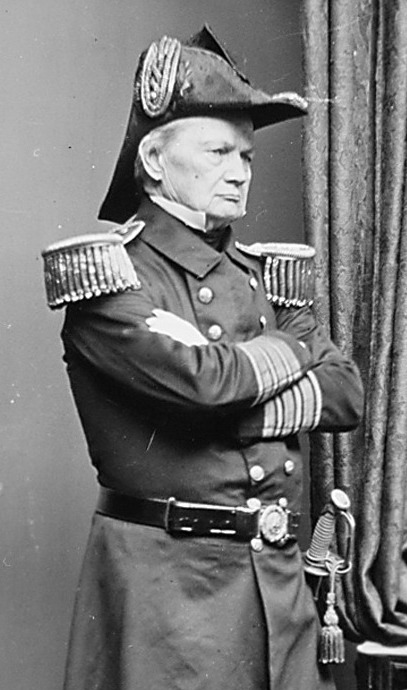
William B. Shubrick, the expedition's commodore. He told López Paraguay needed a good lawyer — and recommended one.

Up to that time it was the largest naval expedition ever to leave the United States. It accounted for 25% of the Navy's personnel and operational vessels.

US Ship	Type	Commander	Remarks
Sabine	Frigate	Captain H.A. Adams	Flag Officer W.B. Shubrick
St Lawrence	Frigate	Captain J.B. Hull	Flag Officer F. Forrest
Falmouth	Sloop-of-war	Commander E. Farrand	
Preble	Sloop-of-war	Commander T.A. Jenkins	
Dolphin	Brig	Commander Charles Steedman	
Bainbridge	Brig	Lt. Commanding F.B. Renshaw	
Perry	Brig	Lt. Commanding R.I. Tilghman	
Memphis	Steamer*	Commander J.B. Marchand	Renamed USS Mystic
Atlanta	Steamer*	Commander D.B. Ridgely	Renamed USS Sumpter
Caledonia	Steamer*	Commander A.L. Case	Renamed USS Mohawk
Southern Star	Steamer*	Commander A.M. Pennock	Renamed USS Crusader
Westernport	Steamer*	Commander T.T. Hunter	Renamed US Wyandotte
Fulton	Steamer	Lt. Commanding J.J. Almy	Subsequently, the flagship
Water Witch	Steamer	Lt. Commanding R.B. Pegram	
M.W. Chapin	Steamer*	Lt. Commanding William Ronckendorff	Renamed USS Anacostia
Metacomet	Steamer*	Lt. Commanding W.H. Macomb	Renamed USS Pulaski
Harriet Lane	Revenue steamer	Captain John Faunce	
Supply	Armed store ship	Lt. Commanding F.M. Stanly	
Release	Armed store ship	Lt. Commanding W.A. Parker	

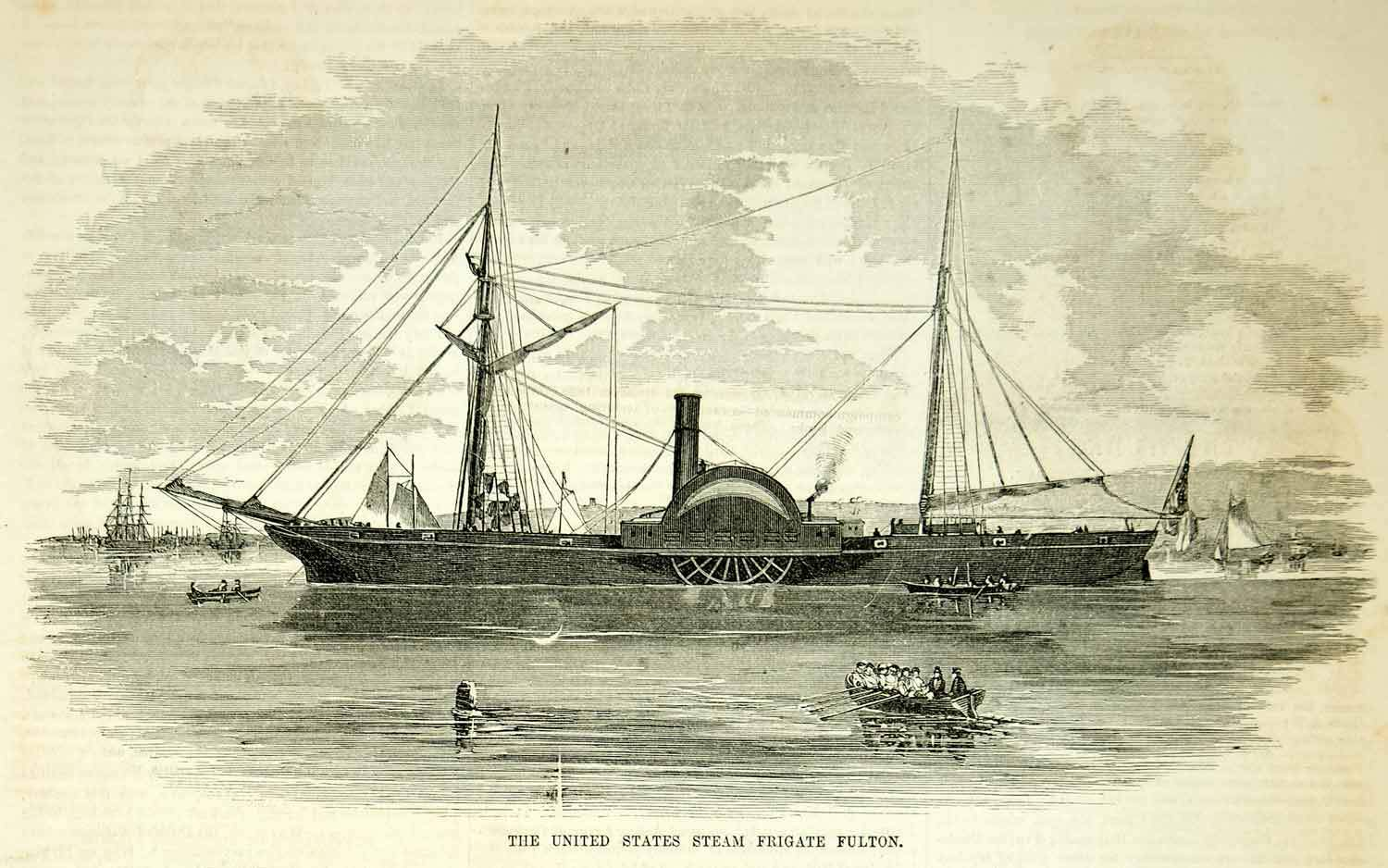
USS Fulton, the vessel that entered Paraguayan waters to negotiate

These ships carried 200 guns and 2,500 men.

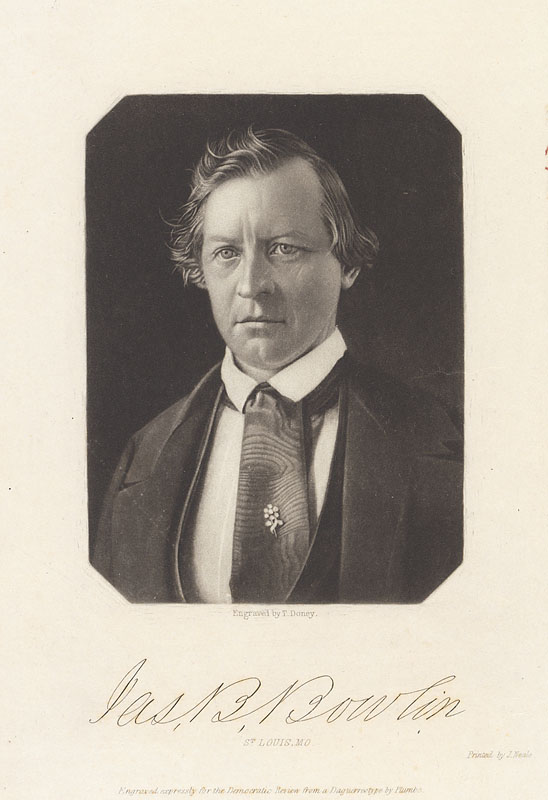
Diplomat James B. Bowlin. Believing that Paraguay had been wronged, his conciliatory attitude resolved the difficulties.

At that time the Navy had few steamships. There was "perennial resistance to modernization by the Navy Department's Board of Navy Commissioners, which was in later years composed of aging line officers. some dating from the War of 1812, and even earlier".

Most of the American sailer fleet drew too much water to ascend the rivers. Therefore, the United States chartered seven commercial steamers and adapted them as naval vessels. The charters gave the United States the option to buy them outright, which it did. In the table they are denoted by an asterisk.

=== The diplomatic arm, and its instructions ===
President Buchanan appointed a diplomat to accompany the expedition. He was Judge James Butler Bowlin, a prominent and well-respected St Louis politician with "a reputation as a forceful, no-nonsense diplomat".

Bowlin was instructed to demand:

- "an apology for the attack upon the Water Witch";
- "an apology for the rude and offensive manner in which Commander Page's proposition for an exchange of the ratifications of the Treaty was received, and for the rejection of that of Mr Fitzpatrick upon the grounds alleged";
- "an indemnification of not less than five thousand dollars to be paid to the representatives of the seaman who was killed upon the occasion"; and
- "a suitable indemnification in behalf of the United States and Paraguay Company for their losses and damages in consequence of the treatment of the servants of that Company by the Paraguayan government".

As to the last point, Bowlin was not to accept less than $500,000. If, however, Paraguay would not pay even that, the claim was to go to international arbitration. "An indispensable preliminary, however, to this adjustment, will, of course, be an acknowledgment on the part of the Paraguayan government of its liability to the Company". In other words, the arbitrators were to assume Paraguay was liable; their sole function was to determine the monetary amount.

=== The military challenge ===
Asunción in the heart of South America. The satellite images reveal the river valleys.

Should Bowlin be unable to achieve an agreement with Paraguay on these issues, he was to turn matters over to Commodore Shubrick. Then Shubrick was to:-

- Blockade the Paraguay River to prevent commerce.
- Attack and destroy the Paraguayan Fortress of Humaitá.
- Proceed to the capital Asunción and capture it by force if necessary.

Shubrick could have blockaded Paraguay, but the rest of his orders may not have been feasible for any naval force of the wooden-warship era.

Paraguay lay in the heart of South America and had to be approached — and if necessary, fought — through tricky rivers, requiring the skills of a brown-water navy. Fulton alone ran aground four times on her ascent to Asunción, once being stuck for four days. There were strong currents; the sailing warships, if they could have ascended at all, would have been practically useless. The steamships chartered by the expedition were defective (see below); the New York Tribune called them "canal boats" and claimed they were ridiculed everywhere. Apart from other defects, they had never been designed as war vessels, and their boilers and engines were exposed and extremely vulnerable to artillery fire.

The Fortress of Humaitá was an array of batteries overlooking a tight horseshoe bend in the Paraguay River. It barred the way to Asunción. It was by no means easy to capture and destroy this fortress. "A hard nut to crack", it was afterwards known as the Gibraltar of South America. Shubrick himself called it "formidable". Its batteries had furnaces for making cannonballs red hot. While not an exact parallel, in the subsequent War of the Triple Alliance (1864–1870) it took a combined Brazilian-Argentine force more than two years, incurring major casualties; and, unlike Commodore Shubrick, the allies had ironclad warships and a large siege army with logistical support.

For hostile vessels, even the river approach to Humaitá was dangerous.

Shubrick had only 291 marines and with such a small force land operations were out of the question.

One scholarly assessment is that Shubrick's warlike resources were "woefully inadequate" for the job. Another is that "it is highly unlikely that López was not aware of the weakness of the United States force".

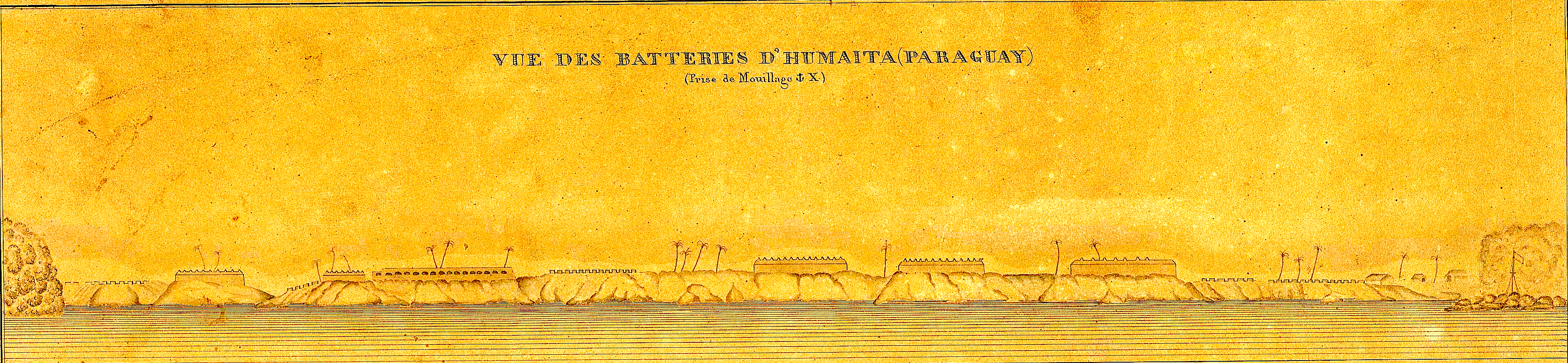
Panoramic view of the batteries of Humaitá (horizontally scroll), surreptitiously sketched by Lt. Mouchez of the French Navy. Extending 6,000 feet, they overlooked a tight bend in the river.

As for capturing Asunción, the allies in the War of the Triple Alliance were to do it in January 1869, but they had large armies and incurred very large casualties. The Paraguayans fought fanatically, losing (on a cautious estimate) between one fourth and one half of their population.

If Shubrick had blockaded Paraguay, it would have been financially inconvenient for that country, but not disastrous, because Paraguay was self-sufficient. Previously, Paraguay had for years defied dictator Manuel de Rosas of Buenos Aires (1835–1852) when he had tried to do the same.

It appears that by November 1858 it had dawned on President Buchanan and his cabinet that López, if attacked, meant to fight: in which case (according to The New York Times) "it is the settled conviction of the Cabinet that the Expedition will be defeated".

== Approach to Asunción ==
Units of the expedition began arriving in Montevideo, Uruguay in December 1858. It caused intense alarm in the region.

Judge Bowlin, however, appreciated it was essential to convey America's peaceful intentions. To do that, he wrote, the diplomatic mission intended to go up to Paraguay in USS Fulton alone, other U.S. vessels to go no further than Corrientes, Argentina. Maybe Paraguay would object to Fulton entering its territorial waters, in which case they would travel on a Paraguayan steamer, for "I am resolved to have no controversy with them on so immaterial a point".

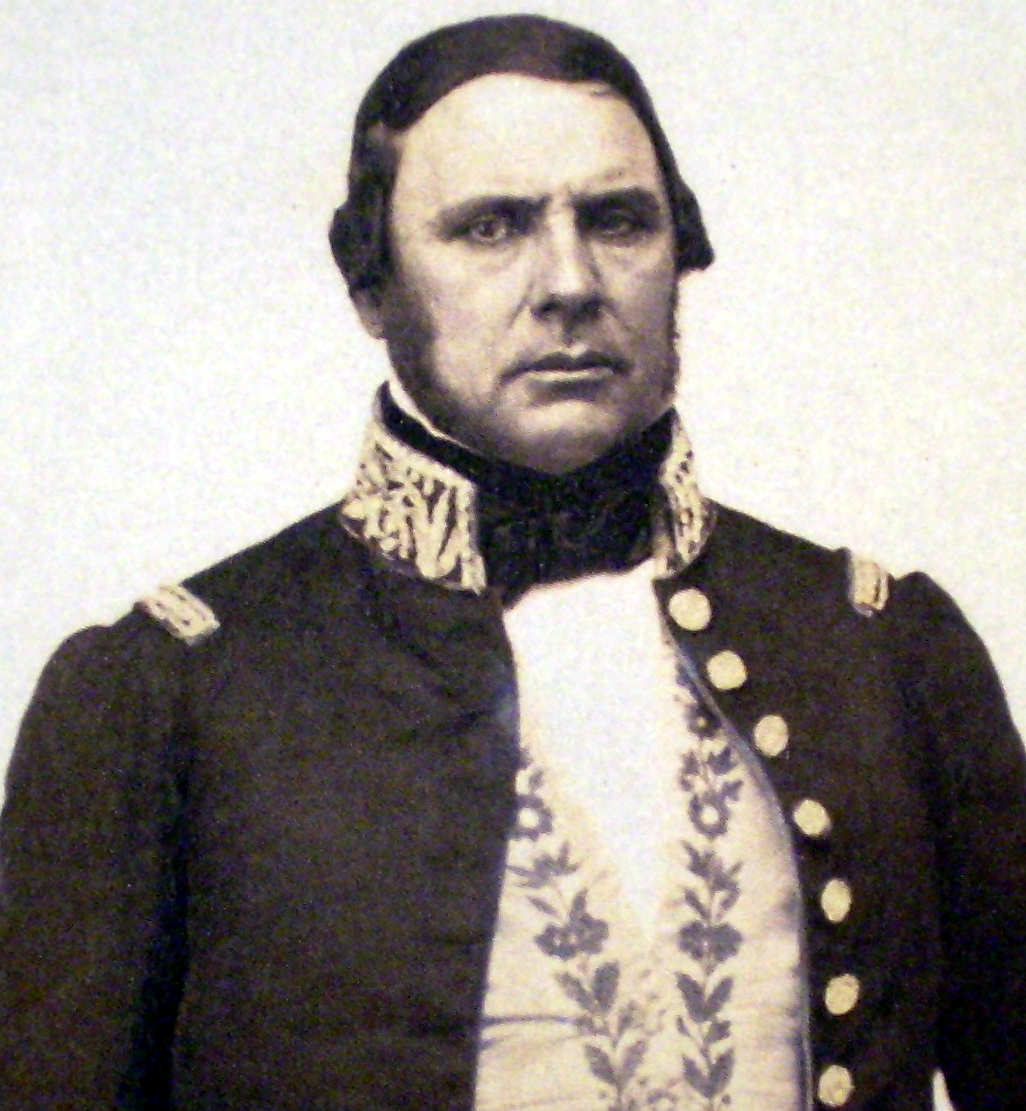
Justo José de Urquiza, President of the Argentine Confederation, was anxious to promote a settlement between López and the U.S.A.

The larger ships remained in Montevideo while the lighter vessels went up the Paraná River, where all of them ran aground more than once and had to be extricated by the revenue cutter Harriet Lane, on loan from New York Harbor, and named after Buchanan's niece. Some stopped at Rosario, Argentina, while others steamed up to the town of Paraná. At that time the small town was capital of the Argentine Confederation, because the State of Buenos Aires had seceded. There they met Justo José de Urquiza, president of the Argentine Confederation.

General Urquiza had major problems of his own. His cash-strapped Argentine Confederation was struggling with the State of Buenos Aires, which had successfully bribed his navy to defect. He had good relations with López of Paraguay, and wanted to keep it that way, because he hoped for an alliance against Buenos Aires. Conversely, Buenos Aires hated López, so American aggression would suit them well, wrote Bowlin. Urquiza decided to try his utmost to persuade López to come to a friendly settlement with Commissioner Bowlin, and went to Asunción himself, preceding the Americans. Afterwards, it was credibly alleged that Urquiza had managed to get hold of a copy of Bowlin's secret instructions, hence knew the American negotiating hand; he did not fail to divulge it to López.

As Judge Bowlin got nearer to the Paraguayan capital his sense of fairness and deepening knowledge led to him to become increasingly skeptical about the Rhode Island company's claim, which he called "swaggering boasting".

As planned, no American vessels went further than Corrientes, Argentina, except USS Fulton, which steamed on to Paraguay. Fulton carried Commodore Shubrick, Commissioner Bowlin, and secretary and interpreter Sam Ward. (After the parties came to terms, Water Witch was invited up to Asunción.)

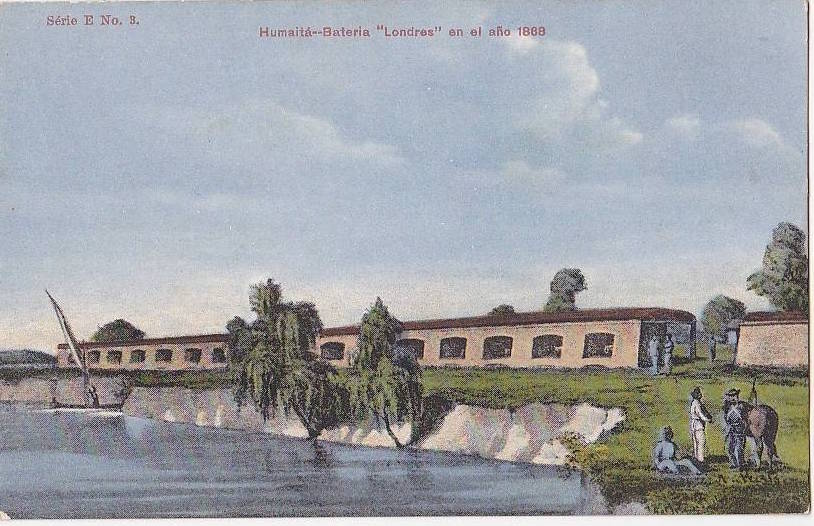
The Londres Battery of the Humaitá fortifications, here partly dismantled, but normally protected by layers of heaped earth. No wooden warships ever tried to force their way past Humaitá.

The Fortress of Humaitá was a few miles up the mouth of the Paraguay River, and Fulton approached it with caution. They came to the Londres battery. "Bowlin was probably unaware that 12,000 Paraguayan troops and most of the national artillery park were then massed at Humaitá to contest passage of the river if necessary".

According to one account,

Sixteen ominous apertures pointed their gloom, and whatever else they may contain, upon us; and, like the eyes of the figure in the picture, seemed to follow the vessel’s motion, with a precision that is not always agreeable under similar circumstances. These apertures are those of the casemate battery, constructed of brick, but very deep, and defended by the very formidable battery of sixteen eight-inch guns... To the left of the casemate we discovered a more substantial structure, viz.: twenty-five gun battery of thirty-two and twenty-four pounders, besides two eight-inch. Spacious barracks showed that no mean force defended the place, and though there was neither the disturbance nor the disorder of men rushing to their guns, or forming battalions, I occasionally caught a glimpse of the mass that awaited in the rear the ordeal through which we were passing. None of the batteries were manned except the casemate, whose large guns were prepared for the destruction they might well occasion.

To a hail from the shore, the USS Fulton came to anchor, and despatched a boat saying she was Fulton, an American naval vessel bound to Asunción with a United States Commissioner on board. They asked if there was any objection to the Fulton proceeding on her course. A pacific answer was shortly received. Fulton arrived at the Paraguayan capital on 24 January 1859, 1,300 miles (2,100 km) from the sea.

== Negotiations ==
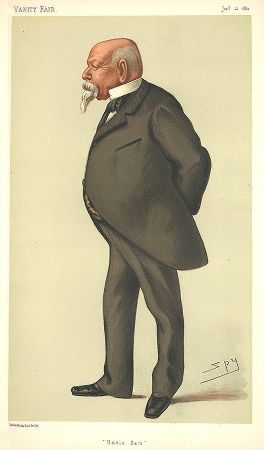
Sam Ward, secretary to the diplomatic mission, was bribed by President López. (An older Ward, 1880.)

By now López understood the Americans came in a conciliatory spirit, and they were received respectfully. While López knew a blockade would cause Paraguay some financial loss, he thought it could not last for long because America was about to descend into civil war. He was not intimidated. However, López had his troubles with Brazil, and did not need another enemy. If he could do it with dignity, he wanted a treaty of friendship with America, and Bowlin was offering him one. A form of words could be found — and was found — to save face over the Water Witch incident.

The stumbling block was the claim by the Rhode Island company. López was prepared to pay up to $250,000 to get rid of it, but Bowlin's instructions did not allow him to settle for under $500,000. However, by now Bowlin was convinced the claim was worthless, and he persuaded López that, if he went to arbitration, Paraguay would do well. He offered to testify for Paraguay in person. Commodore Shubrick even gave López the name of a top American lawyer.

Bowlin's secretary and translator was Sam Ward, a brother of poet Julia Ward Howe. Sam, an accomplished bon viveur, was later famous as the "King of the Lobby". At that time Ward was in straitened financial circumstances, but he soon changed all that by making a private deal with President López. Ward was to lobby in Washington to get the treaty ratified, and he was to get himself appointed secretary to the arbitration commission and use his influence to get its award as far as possible below $500,000. For the first service Ward was to get a lump sum; for the second, a 2% commission on any amount Paraguay saved. A later scholar wrote that the Rhode Island company figured out Ward had been bribed, and tried to outbribe him. However, the corruption of Sam Ward probably made little difference in the end.

There was a serious last-minute snag in the negotiations which, however, was smoothed over, possibly with a little creative bending of Bowlin's mandate.

== The settlement ==
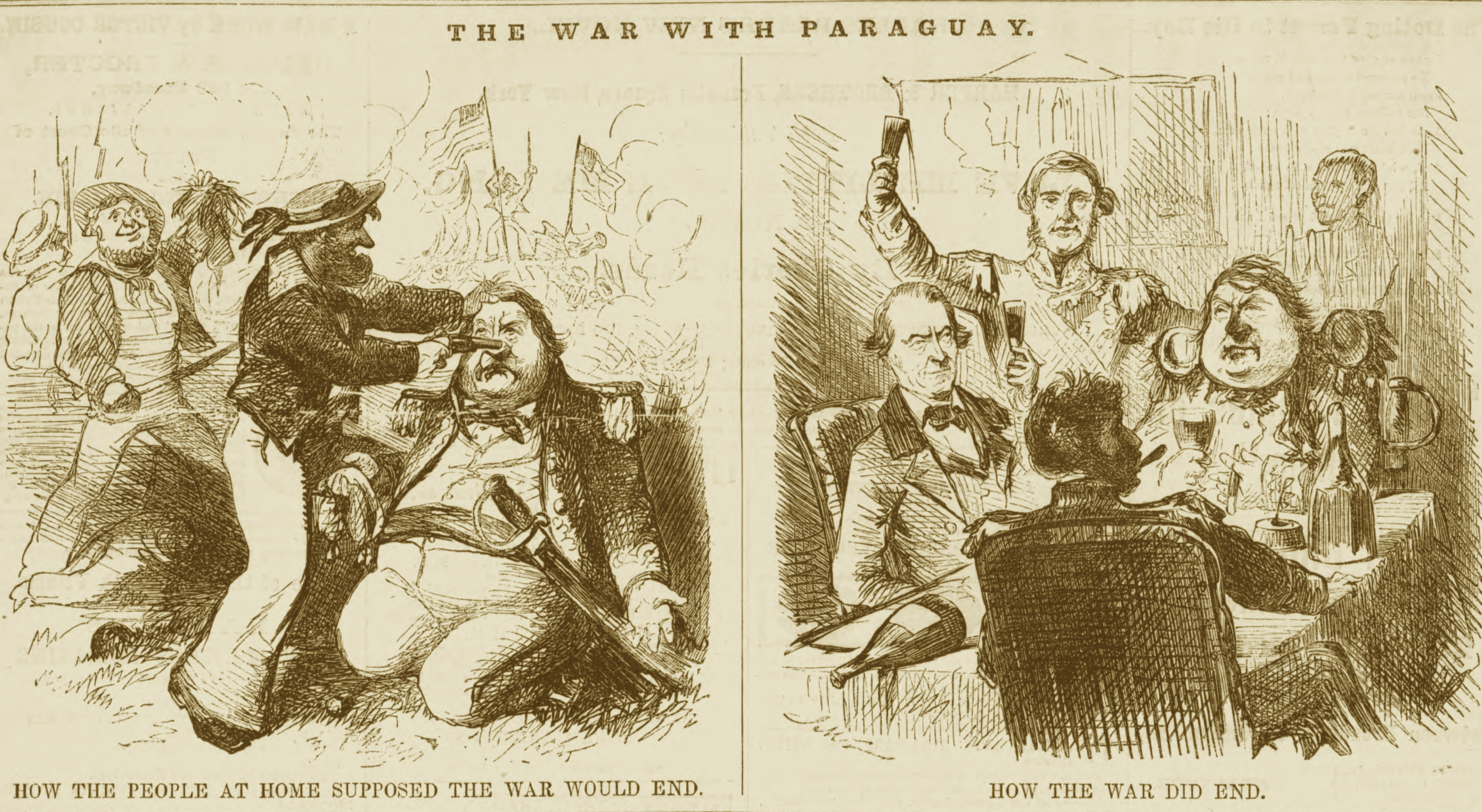
Settlement (cartoon in Harper's Weekly, 30 April 1859)

Commissioner Bowlin and President López came to a settlement, as follows.

- A form of words was found to save face over the incident of Water Watch and the fort. The government of Paraguay did not admit it was to blame, saying the fort was only obeying standing orders, there being no intent to insult the American flag. However Paraguay deplored the incident had happened because it was open to misinterpretation.
- Paraguay quietly sent a draft for 10,000 pesos for the helmsman's family.
- Paraguay said that, in refusing to ratify the friendship treaty, it had nothing to apologize for. It had wanted a treaty with America all along. The mistakes that prevented Paraguay from ratifying were the fault of American representatives.
- A virtually identical treaty — in English and Spanish — was signed, ratified by Paraguay promptly, and sent to Washington for ratification.
- The Rhode Island company's claim was to be adjudicated by an international commission comprising two arbitrators, one American, the other Paraguayan. If the arbitrators could not agree, a neutral umpire was to decide it.
- The arbitrators were to have a free hand: they could award any sum, including nothing at all. (This was not stated explicitly, but subtle language in the Arbitration Convention allowed it.)

In agreeing this settlement, particularly the last point, Bowlin undoubtedly deviated from his instructions. One scholar wrote that since Bowlin was a lawyer he must have known what he was doing, but it is not necessarily so.

USS Fulton left Asunción on 13 February 1859.

== Aftermath ==
=== Military assessment ===
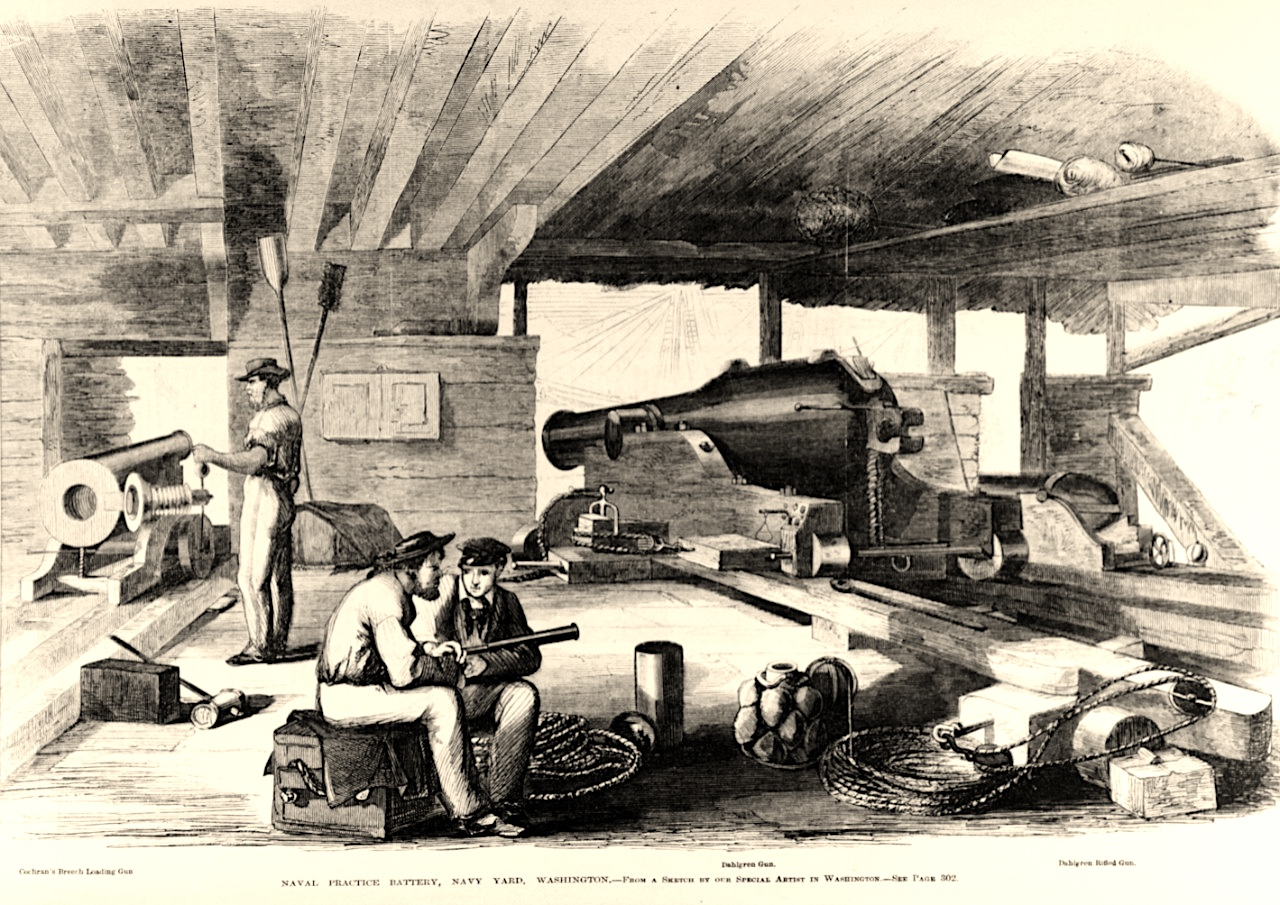
11" Dahlgren gun (center). Their most powerful siege weapon, it could not be used without its carriage.

The Paraguay expedition revealed worrying deficiencies in the antebellum Navy, not because of the officers and men, but owing to incompetent shore-based administration, fueled by inadequate naval budgets. Wrote one scholar:

It was fortunate indeed that the American legation accomplished an acceptable settlement with the swiftness that they did. The serious vulnerability of the Squadron did not become known to the Paraguayans; and the military bluff of the Commodore and Commissioner was carried off with commendable skill. The Squadron was not faced with a test of its offensive power; in the event military action had become necessary, it is unlikely that the naval force could have accomplished its mission with much success.

==== Deficiencies ====
There was a critical shortage of munitions and ordnance: they would have supported a 7-hour bombardment, but not more. There were not enough small arms cartridges. The largest siege weapon — the 11-inch Dahlgren gun — could not have been used for its carriage had not arrived. In one assessment, the Paraguay expedition, if the negotiations had failed "would not have [had] any blockade or other military capability".

There were serious problems in the supply of coal for the steamers.

Seven merchant steamers were chartered, repaired at Navy yards and converted into naval vessels, with an option to buy them (which was exercised). In use, they were assessed unfit as war vessels:

Vessel	Assessment (by her commanding officer or Commodore's investigating commission)	Page
Atlanta	Unfitted for a war vessel	85
Westernport	Totally unsuited for a man-of-war	91
Memphis	For a man-of-war cruiser I deem her totally unfit and unsafe	95
Caledonia	The vessel is very unmanageable under canvas ... I do not like to think what our fate would be if caught on a lee shore with the engine stopped, a thing very likely to occur [since in] twenty-two days, it has given out five times	97
Southern Star	I beg to express a decided opinion that she is entirely unfit for purposes of war	102
Metacomet	Even if put in the best order we do not consider her a seaworthy vessel as, in our opinion, a heavy gale of wind would be fatal to her	110
M.W. Chapin	(a) The Chapin can do nothing without steam ... and with it alone can make little or no progress against a moderate wind and sea (b) The steaming, sailing, and weatherly qualities of the Chapin proved so bad that, in order to reach the United States within a reasonable time, I deemed it proper that she should be helped along by a hawser from one of the other two steamers	112; 95

The flagship USS Sabine was nearly lost in a bad storm, being on her beam ends for five hours. Shubrick blamed a badly repaired tiller and substandard gun ports which had splintered.

=== The international arbitration ===
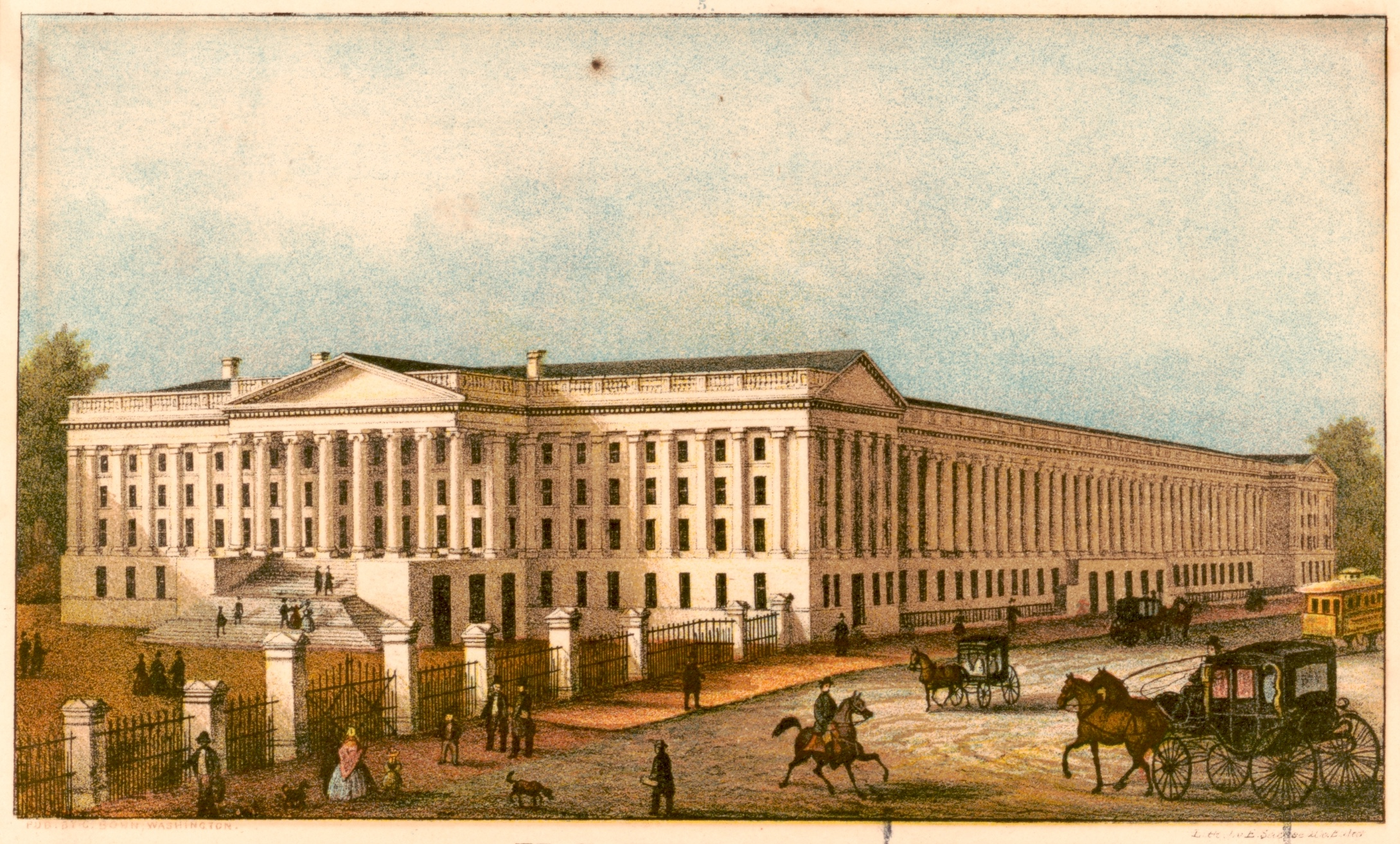
U.S. Treasury Building, Washington, 19th century engraving

Hearings of the international arbitral commission were held at the Treasury Department, Washington D.C., starting June 22, 1860. The commissioners received arguments and examined witnesses over sixteen sessions.

Paraguay hired James Mandeville Carlisle. "A distinguished and clever lawyer, Carlisle had taken part in other international disputes and had excellent political connections". He argued more cases before the Supreme Court than any other counsel of his time. He had been recommended to President López by Commodore Shubrick himself, which suggests Shubrick wanted Paraguay to win.

President Buchanan appointed his old friend Judge Cave Johnson of Tennessee as one arbitrator, and President López appointed José Berges as the other. Berges knew that Sam Ward, the commission's secretary, was on the Paraguayan payroll, for they had traveled to London together where he had paid Ward with his own hands.

==== Zero damages ====
The theory for the claimants was that they were doing well in Paraguay until López became jealous of their success and decided to ruin them. The arbitrators rejected this as absurd. It was the arrogant behavior of Hopkins that was their ruin, neither were they doing very well. Their award (13 August 1860) was as follows:

That the said claimants, "The United States and Paraguay Navigation Company", have not proved or established any right to damages upon their said claim against the Government of the Republic of Paraguay; and that, upon the [evidence], the said government is not responsible to the said company in any damages or pecuniary compensation whatever, in all the premises.

In his detailed reasons Cave Johnson alluded to the "enormous, if not criminal exaggeration of the demands of this company". Hence the company, which could have got $250,000 if Bowlin had had a free hand, received nothing.

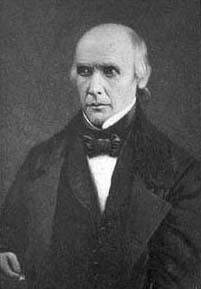
1. America's arbitrator

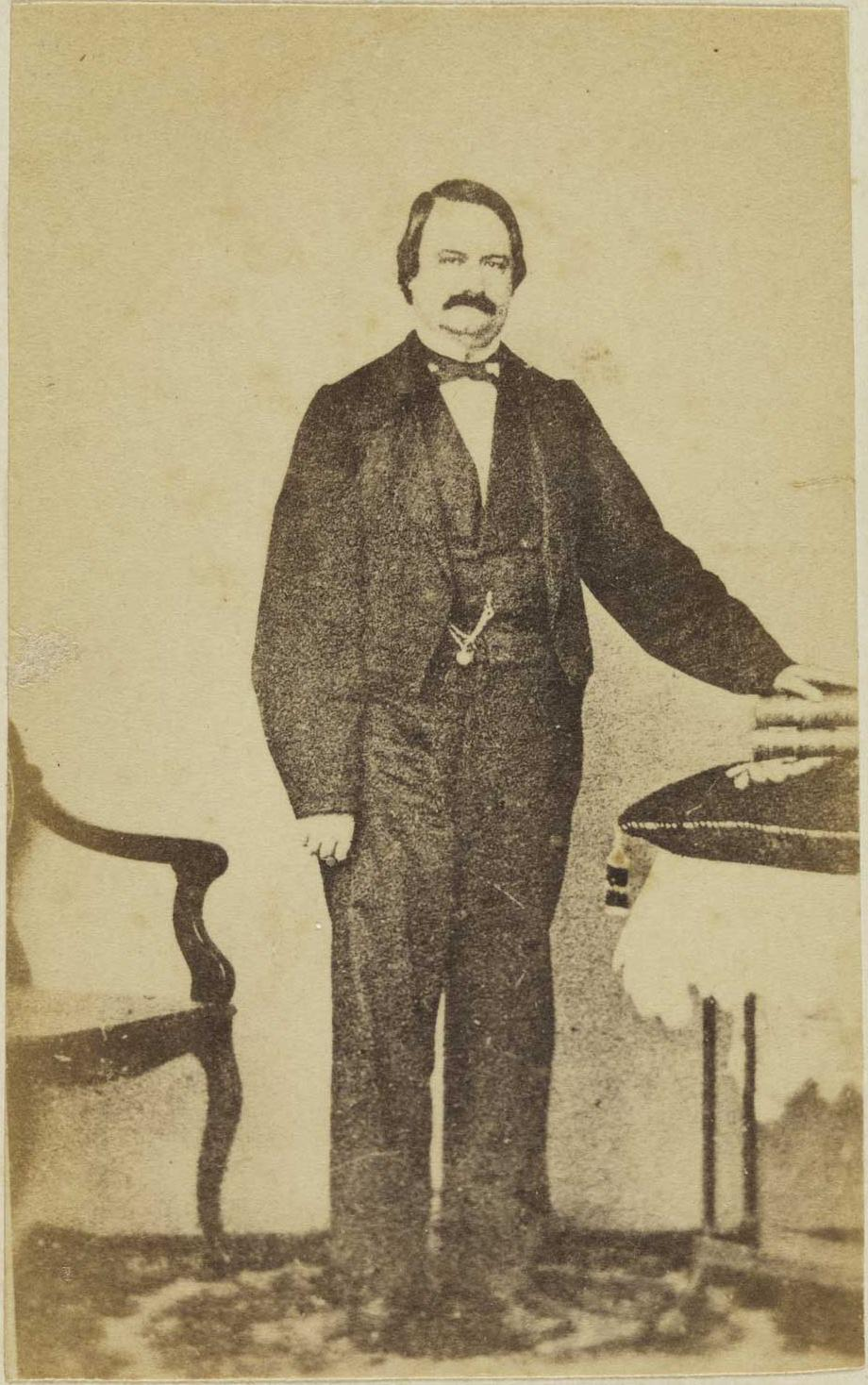
2. Paraguay's arbitrator

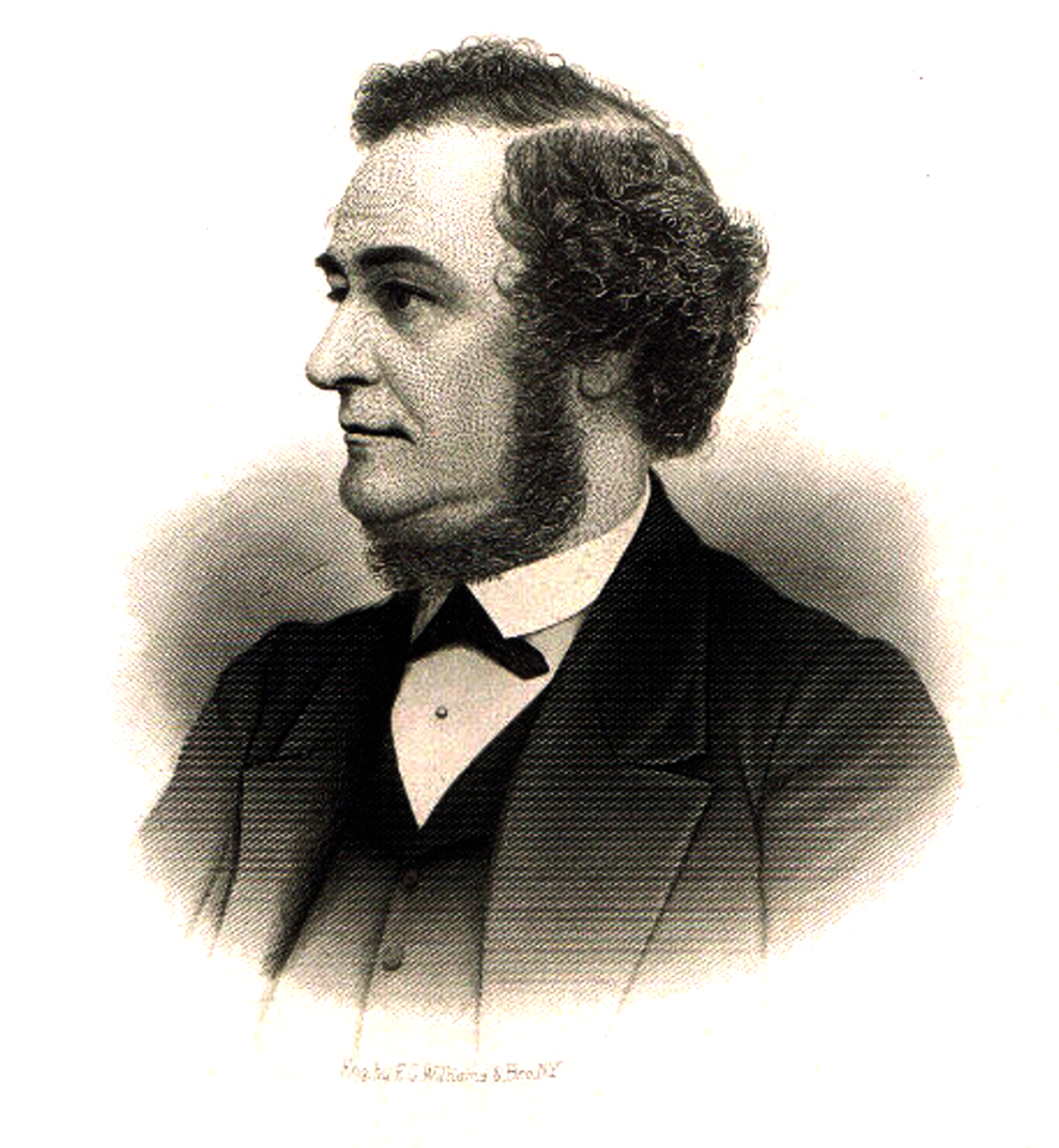
3. Paraguay's lawyer
1. Judge Cave Johnson. Formerly a Postmaster General, he had introduced the postage stamp.
2. José Berges. Paraguay's minister of Foreign Affairs, he was later shot for treason.
3. James Mandeville Carlisle, possibly the best lawyer of the day, represented Paraguay.

From his concluding remarks it seems Cave Johnson agreed it had been a case of attempted State-supported extortion:

It has always been the pride and glory of the government and citizens of the United States "to submit to nothing wrong" from any government or people, but, at the same time, demand of them "nothing but what is right"; and the day is far distant, as I sincerely hope, when East India fortunes are to be accumulated, with their approbation and sanction, by the plunder of feeble States, extorted from them at the cannon's mouth. For the reasons above given, I am clearly of opinion that the award should be in favor of the Republic of Paraguay".

The New York Times said "the fishiness of the claim has been most satisfactorily proven. The Administration fears ridicule, for never did so big a mountain produce so small a mouse".

=== Cost of the expedition ===
The Paraguay expedition cost perhaps $3 million. The cost of chartering and refitting the steamers and supplying them with coal and stores alone amounted to $486,256.57.

=== Disinformation ===
In his memoirs President Buchanan said his administration's foreign policy met with "great and uncommon success", instancing the Paraguay expedition. Exaggerating the extent to which U.S. ships approached Asunción, he claimed Paraguay issued "ample apologies", even though Paraguay had not apologized at all. He mentioned that Paraguay paid $10,000 for the deceased helmsman, but not that his administration had demanded $500,000 minimum for the Rhode Island company, which got nothing. As for the costs of the expedition,

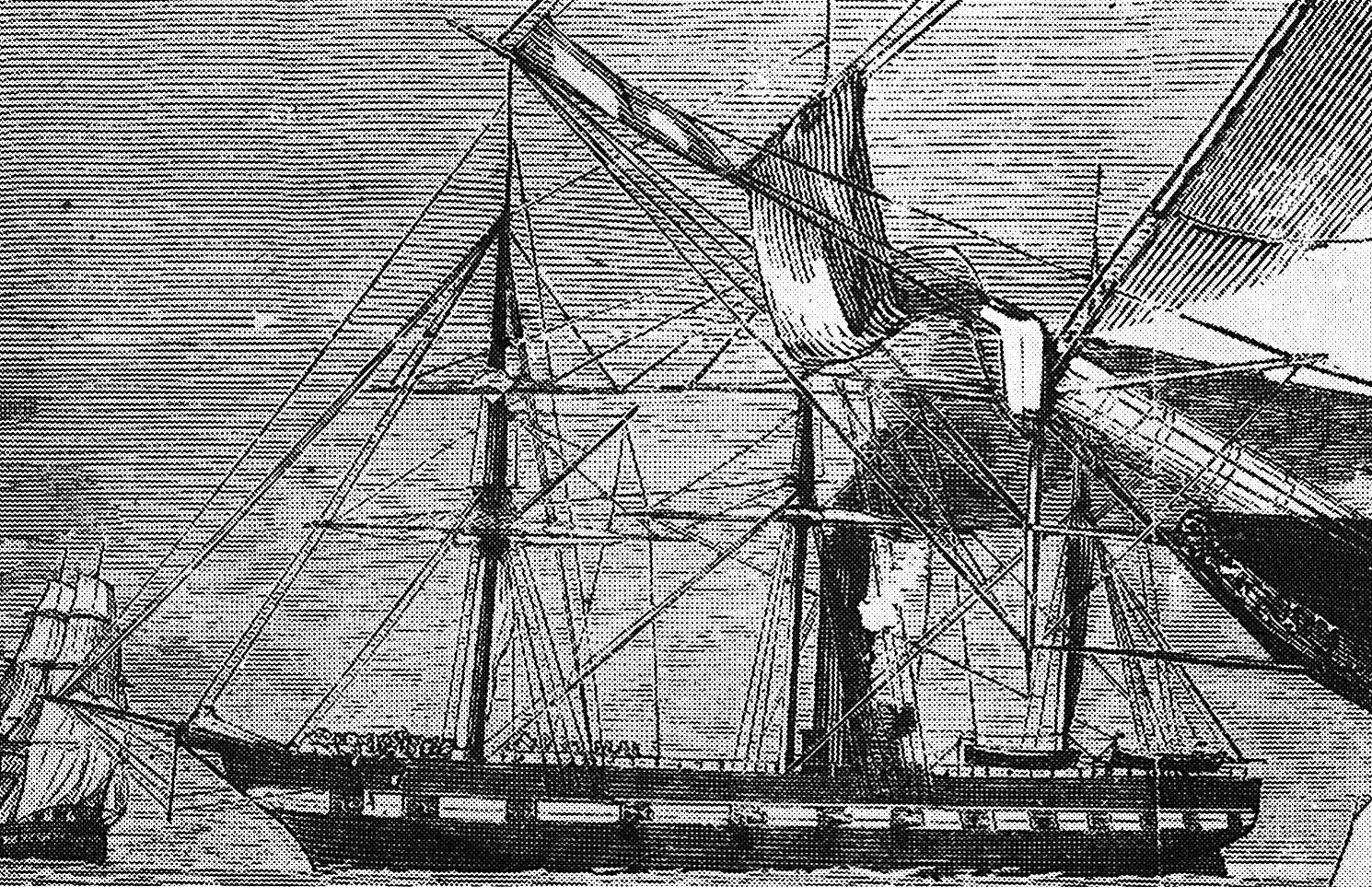
Southern Star, "an accursed ship", one of seven defective steamers sold to the U.S. government in what was said to be a scam

It is a remarkable fact in our history, that its entire expenses were defrayed out of the ordinary appropriations for the naval service. Not a dollar was appropriated by Congress for this purpose, unless we may except the sum of $289,000 for the purchase of seven small steamers of light draft, worth more than their cost, and which were afterwards usefully employed in the ordinary naval service.

That naval officers reported them unfit for purpose was not mentioned. The Republican Congressional Committee riposted that "The expense of the naval service of Mr. Buchanan's past two years is almost twenty-seven millions, doubling that of Mr. Madison's naval expenses during the war with Great Britain, when the glory of our flag of stars illuminated the ocean".

Some elements of the disinformation of the time innocently got into mainstream works, even surviving to the present day.

=== Paraguayan consequences ===
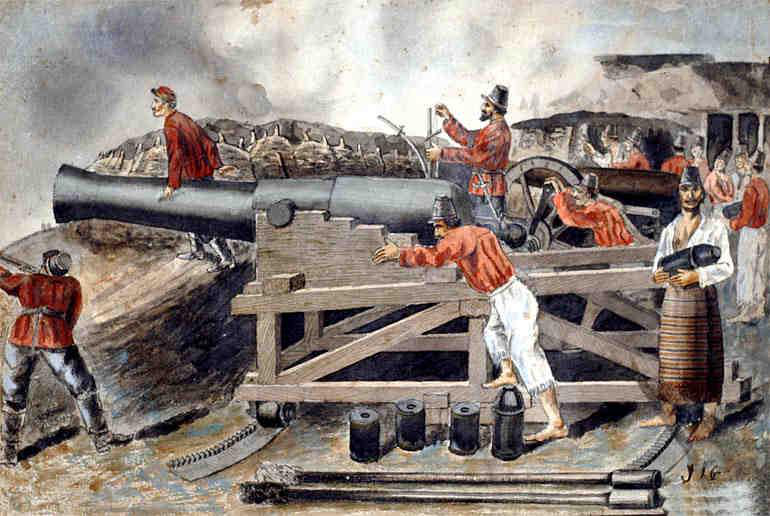
Paraguay became a warlike power and learned to cast sophisticated artillery pieces like this one, El Criollo, made on the Whitworth pattern

In the estimation of John Hoyt Williams, López had reason to be pleased.

He had mastered the second threat of massive naval coercion by a superior power at minimal cost to his pride or reputation... That an incident so grotesque and potentially dangerous could be permitted to grow from series of minor misunderstandings reflected no credit on either contestant. López, father and son, however, were alike in their determination to make Paraguay so strong that further intervention was impossible.

Paraguay continued with its program of technical modernization, most of which was military or defensive in nature, importing hundreds of foreign technicians. For Professor Williams, "The hundreds of heavy-caliber guns at Humaitá and elsewhere, the navy, railroad and telegraph, and munitions manufactures all helped bring about the horrendous War of the Triple Alliance".

=== The fate of José Berges ===
The ultimate fate of José Berges, Paraguay's arbitrator and briber of Sam Ward, was not a happy one. In the War of Paraguay against the Triple Alliance (1864–70) the country was governed by López's son, Francisco Solano. When the war was going badly for Paraguay, José Berges, like many other prominent Paraguayans, was accused of treason. They were arrested, brought to the town of San Fernando, severely tortured (Berges was "reduced to groveling idiocy"), forced to confess to a conspiracy that probably never existed, and shot; this event was called the San Fernando massacre.

=== Persistence ===
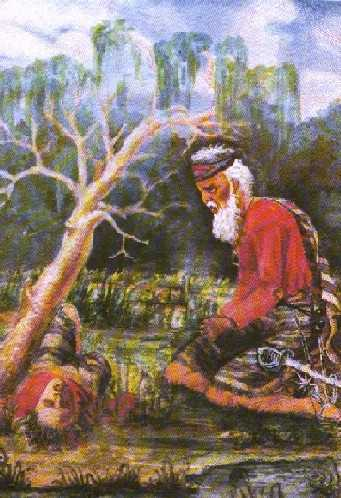
Paraguay was ruined in the subsequent War of the Triple Alliance

Buchanan refused to accept the arbitrators' award, arguing that they had no power to award no damages at all. In 1861, President Lincoln sent Charles Ames Washburn to Asunción to revive the claim, but the Paraguayan government declined to reopen it. Paraguay was ruined in the War of the Triple Alliance (1864–1870) and its archives were dispersed and disorganized.

Still Hopkins did not give up. In 1885, the U.S. government revived the claim. In 1887 (when corruption in Paraguayan politics "was taken for granted"), a minister signed a document agreeing to settle the claim for $90,000 in gold "with the previous consent and complete approval of Mr Edward A. Hopkins". Although ratified by one house of the Paraguayan legislature, it failed to pass the other.

The treaty of friendship, commerce, and navigation between Paraguay and the United States was still in force as of January 1, 1948.

== Sources ==
=== General ===
- Ayers, Edward L. (2009). Berncaw, Nancy; Ownby, Ted (eds.). The New Encyclopedia of Southern Culture. Vol. 13: Gender. University of North Carolina Press. ISBN 978-0-8078-3287-5.
- Barnes, William; Morgan, John Heath (1961). The Foreign Service of the United States: Origins, Development, and Functions. Department of State.
- Benítes, Gregorio (1904). La triple alianza de 1865: Escapada de un desastre en la Guerra de Invasion al Paraguay (in Spanish). Asunción: Talleres Mons.
- Bermejo, Ildefonso Antonio (1873). Repúblicas americanas: episodios de la vida privada, política y social en la República del Paraguay (in Spanish). Madrid: Imp. de R. Labajos.
- Bowlin, James B (1938). Manning, William R. (ed.). Diplomatic Correspondence of the United States: inter-American affairs, 1831–1860. Vol. X. Washington: Carnegie Endowment for International Peace.
- Box, Pelham Horton (1930). The Origins of the Paraguayan War. University of Illinois Studies in the Social Sciences (rep. 1967 Russell & Russell. N.Y.).
- Buchanan, James (1863). The Administration on the Eve of the Rebellion: History of Four Years Before the War. London: Sampson Low, Son & Marston.
- Buchanan, James (1917). "First Annual Message". In Muller, Julius W. (ed.). Presidential Messages and State Papers: Being the Epoch-Making National Documents of all the Presidents from George Washington to Woodrow Wilson, Collected and Arranged, with Brief Biographical Sketches. Vol. V. New York: The Review of Reviews Company.
- Burton, Captain Sir Richard (1870). Letters from the Battle-fields of Paraguay. London: Tinsley Brothers.
- Calvo, Carlos (1864). Una página de derecho internacional, o La América del Sur ante la ciencia del derecho de gentes moderno (in Spanish). Paris: A. Durand.
- Carr, Wilbur J. (1907). "The American Consular Service". The American Journal of International Law. I (II): 891–913. doi:10.2307/2186497. JSTOR 2186497.
- Commission Under the Convention Between the United States & Paraguay (1860). Statements and Arguments for Claimants and for the Republic, and Opinion and Award of Commissioners. Washington: Henry Polkinhorn, printer.
- Corriston, Mark (December 1983). The Paraguay Expedition (PDF) (MA). Emporia State University.
- Denison, John Ledyard (1862). A Pictorial History of the Navy of the United States. San Francisco CA: Henry Hill for Francis Dewing.
- Espil, Courtney Letts de (1953). "John Pendleton and His Friendship with Urquiza". The Hispanic American Historical Review. 33 (1). Duke University Press: 152–167. JSTOR 2509650.
- Flickema, Thomas Orin (1966). The United States and Paraguay, 1845–1860: misunderstanding, miscalculation, and misconduct (PhD thesis). Wayne State University.
- Flickema, Thomas O. (July 1968). "The Settlement of the Paraguayan-American Controversy of 1859: A Reappraisal". The Americas. 25 (1). Cambridge University Press: 59–69. doi:10.2307/980097. JSTOR 980097.
- Flickema, Thomas O. (1970). ""Sam Ward's Bargain": A Tentative Reconsideration". The Hispanic American Historical Review. 50 (3). Duke University Press: 538–542. doi:10.2307/2512196. JSTOR 2512196.
- Garavaglia, Juan Carlos (2010). "Rentas, deuda pública y construcción estatal: la Confederación Argentina, 1852-1861". Desarrollo Económico (in Spanish). 50 (198): 223–248. JSTOR 41219100.
- Harrison, John P. (1955). "Science and Politics: Origins and Objectives of Mid-Nineteenth Century Government Expeditions to Latin America". The Hispanic American Historical Review. 35 (2): 175–202. JSTOR 2508721.
- Hopkins, Edward Augustus (1858). Historico-political memorial upon the regions of the Rio de la Plata and conterminous countries; to James Buchanan, President of the United States. New York: Pudney & Russell, printers.
- Hutchinson, Thomas J. (1868). The Paraná With Incidents of the Paraguayan War and South American Recollections from 1861 to 1868. London: Edward Stanford.
- Kennedy, Commander A. J. (1869). La Plata, Brazil and Paraguay During the Present War. London: Edward Stanford.
- Laing, E.A.M. (1976). "The Royal Navy on the River Parana During the Allied Intervention, 1845–1846". The American Neptune. XXXVI: 125–137.
- Littlehales, G.W. (1899). "The Navy as a Motor in Geographical and Commercial Progress". Journal of the American Geographical Society of New York. 31 (2): 123–149. JSTOR 196932.
- Manning, William R., ed. (1939). Diplomatic Correspondence of the United States: inter-American affairs, 1831–1860. Vol. X. Washington: Carnegie Endowment for International Peace.
- McClay, Edgar Stanton (1898). A History of the United States Navy from 1775 to 1898. Vol. II. New York: D. Appleton.
- McKanna, Clare V. (1971). "The Water Witch Incident". The American Neptune. XXXI (1). Salem, Massachusetts: The Peabody Museum of Salem: 7–18.
- Miller, Hunter, ed. (1948). Treaties and other international acts of the United States of Amerirca. Vol. 8. Washington: U.S. Government Printing Office.
- Moore, John Bassett (1898). History and Digest of the International Arbitrations to Which the United States Has Been a Party. Vol. II. Washington DC: Government Printing Office.
- Mora, Frank O.; Cooney, Jerry Wilson (2007). Paraguay and the United States: Distant Allies. University of Georgia Press. ISBN 978-0820338989.
- Mörner, Magnus (1959). "Review: La expedición norteamericana contra el Paraguay, 1858-1859. Tomo II by Pablo Max Ynsfran". The Americas. 15 (4). Cambridge University Press: 416–418. doi:10.2307/978873. JSTOR 978873. (article in English)
- Naval History and Heritage Command (26 October 2015). "Water Witch III (SwStr)".
- Pacheco, Josephine F. (2010). The Pearl: A Failed Slave Escape on the Potomac. University of North Carolina Press. ISBN 9780807888926.
- Page, Thomas Jefferson (1859). La Plata, the Argentine Confederation and Paraguay. Narrative of the exploration of the tributaries of the river La Plata during the years 1853,'54,'55, and '56 under the orders of the United States government. New York: Harper.
- Parramore, Thomas C. (1965). "The Ironic Fate of the Southern Star". The North Carolina Historical Review. 42 (3): 335–344. JSTOR 23517781.
- Peterson, Harold F. (1942). "Edward A. Hopkins: A Pioneer Promoter in Paraguay". The Hispanic American Historical Review. 22 (2). Duke University Press: 245–261. doi:10.2307/2506869. JSTOR 2506869.
- Peterson, Harold F. (1955). "Review: La Expedición Norteamericana Contra el Paraguay, 1858-1859. Primera Parte. Los Antecedentes. by Pablo Max Ynsfran". The Hispanic American Historical Review. 35 (3): 416–7. doi:10.2307/2509543. JSTOR 2509543. (article in English)
- Republican Congressional Committee (1860). The Ruin of the Democratic Party: Reports of the Covode and Other Committees. Washington.
- Secretary of the Navy (1860a). "Report, Navy Department, December 2, 1859". The Executive Documents, Printed by Order of the Senate of The United States, First Session Of The Thirty-Sixth Congress, 1859–60. Vol. III. Washington.
- Secretary of the Navy (1860b). Expenses – Paraguay Expedition (Misc. Doc. No. 86). Washington DC: Thomas H. Ford printer.
- Smith, Gene Allen; Bartlett, Larry (2009). ""A Most Unprovoked, Unwarranted and Dastardly Attack": James Buchanan, Paraguay, and the Water Witch Incident of 1855" (PDF). Northern Mariner/Le Marin du Nord. 19 (3). Canadian Nautical Research Society.
- Stampp, Kenneth M. (1990). America in 1857: A Nation on the Brink. Oxford University Press. ISBN 0-19-503902-5.
- Steedman, Charles (1912). Mason, Amos Larence (ed.). Memoir and Correspondence. Cambridge: Privately printed.
- Still, William N. Jr. (1988). Ironclad Captains: The Commanding Officers of the USS Monitor. National Oceanic and Atmospheric Administration.
- "The Demonstration Against Paraguay". New York Times. 24 September 1858. p. 4.
- "The Paraguay Expedition". New York Times. 18 November 1858. p. 4.
- Thompson, George (1869). The War In Paraguay: With a Historical Sketch of the Country and Its People and Notes Upon the Military Engineering of the War. London: Longman’s, Green and Co.
- Verney, Michael A. (2020). ""The Universal Yankee Nation"". Diplomatic History. 44 (2): 337–364. JSTOR 10.2307/27212490.
- Warren, Harris Gaylord (1949). Paraguay, An Informal History. University of Oklahoma Press.
- Warren, Harris Gaylord (1959). "Review: La expedición norteamericana contra el Paraguay. 1858–1859. Segunda Parte. Los resultados. by Pablo Max Ynsfran". The Hispanic American Historical Review. 39 (2): 286–7. doi:10.2307/2509886. JSTOR 2509886. (article in English)
- Warren, Harris Gaylord; Warren, Katherine F. (1985). Rebirth of the Paraguayan Republic: The First Colorado Era, 1878-1904. Pittsburgh, PA: University of Pittsburgh Press. ISBN 0-8229-3507-4.
- Washburn, Charles (1871). The History of Paraguay: With Notes of Personal Observations, and Reminiscences of Diplomacy Under Difficulties. Vol. I. Boston: Lee and Shephard.
- Whigham, Thomas (1988). "Some Reflections on Early Anglo-Paraguayan Commerce". The Americas. 44 (3): 279–284. JSTOR 1006907.
- Whigham, Thomas L. (2002). The Paraguayan War, Volume 1, Causes and Conflict. Lincoln and London: University of Nebraska Press. ISBN 0-8032-4786-9.
- Whigham, Thomas L. (2018a). The Paraguayan War: Causes and Early Conduct (2nd ed.). Calgary, AB: University of Calgary Press. ISBN 978-1-55238-994-2.
- Whigham, Thomas (2018b). "Court of Blood: Treason and Terror under Paraguay's Francisco Solano López". The Americas. 75 (2): 325–348. doi:10.1017/tam.2017.85.
- Williams, John Hoyt (1971). "The Archivo Nacional in Asuncion, Paraguay". Latin American Research Review. , Vol=6 (1): 101–118. JSTOR 2502212.
- Williams, John Hoyt (1972). "Woodbine Parish and the 'Opening' of Paraguay". Proceedings of the American Philosophical Society. 116 (4). American Philosophical Society: 343–349. JSTOR 985904.
- Williams, John Hoyt (1975). "From the Barrel of a Gun: Some Notes on Dr. Francia and Paraguayan Militarism". Proceedings of the American Philosophical Society. 119 (1). American Philosophical Society: 73–86. JSTOR 986650.
- Williams, John Hoyt (1977). "Foreign Tecnicos and the Modernization of Paraguay, 1840–1870". Journal of Interamerican Studies and World Affairs. 19 (2). Cambridge University Press: 233–257. doi:10.2307/174705. JSTOR 174705.
- Williams, John Hoyt (1979). The Rise and Fall of the Paraguayan Republic, 1800-1870. University of Texas Press. ISBN 0292770170.
- Williams, John Hoyt (1980). "The Undrawn Line: Three Centuries of Strife on the Paraguayan-Mato Grosso Frontier". Luso-Brazilian Review. 17 (1). University of Wisconsin Press: 17–40. JSTOR 3513374.
- Yanaway, Philip E. (1976). "The United States Revenue Cutter Harriet Lane, 1857–1884". The American Neptune. XXXVI (3). Salem, Massachusetts: The Peabody Museum of Salem.
- Ynsfran, Pablo Max (1954). "Sam Ward's Bargain With President López of Paraguay". The Hispanic American Historical Review. 34 (3). Duke University Press: 313–331. doi:10.2307/2508877. JSTOR 2508877.

=== Paraguayan government publications ===
- "Una ocurrencia desagradable". Semanario de Avisos y Conocimientos Útiles (in Spanish). No. 56. Asunción. 5 August 1854.
- "Documentos oficiales". Semanario de Avisos y Conocimientos Útiles (in Spanish). No. 62. Asunción. 16 September 1854.
- "El Water Witch Americano". Semanario de Avisos y Conocimientos Útiles (in Spanish). No. 82. Asunción. 3 February 1855.
