= List of shipwrecks in May 1944 =

The list of shipwrecks in May 1944 includes ships sunk, foundered, grounded, or otherwise lost during May 1944.

== 1 May ==
List of shipwrecks: 1 May 1944
Ship	State	Description
Asosan Maru	Imperial Japanese Army	World War II: Convoy Higashi Matsu No. 5: The Asosan Maru-class auxiliary transport ship was torpedoed in the Philippine Sea east of Mindanao, Philippines 7°07′N 129°56′E by USS Bluegill (United States Navy). The submarine returned the next day and sank her with gunfire. Three men were killed.
CH-10	Imperial Japanese Navy	World War II: Convoy Higashi-Matsu No. 6: The CH-4-class submarine chaser ran aground and was wrecked off the north tip of Palau (07°20′N 134°30′E). She was abandoned by her crew the next day.
HMS HDML 1380	Royal Navy	The Harbour Defence Motor Launch sank in the Aegean Sea in a storm. Seven crew died in the sinking or of their wounds.
Janeta	United Kingdom	World War II: The cargo ship (5,312 GRT, 1929) was torpedoed and sunk in the South Atlantic 900 nautical miles (1,700 km) south by west of Ascension Island (18°14′S 20°00′W) by U-181 (Kriegsmarine) with the loss of thirteen of her 48 crew. Survivors were rescued by USS Alger (United States Navy), Freja (Sweden) and another vessel.
KT 2	Kriegsmarine	World War II: The transport was sunk in an Allied air raid on Genoa, Italy.
Medea	Germany	World War II: The transport ship struck a mine and sank in the Jade Bight.
SF 283	Kriegsmarine	World War II: The Siebel ferry was sunk by Allied fighter-bomber aircraft at Metkovic, Croatia.
Siena	Germany	World War II: The cargo ship was torpedoed and sunk in the Mediterranean Sea off Port-Vendres, Pyrénées-Orientales, France by HMS Untiring (Royal Navy). Four of her 43 crew were killed.
U-277	Kriegsmarine	World War II: The Type VIIC submarine was depth charged and sunk in the Arctic Ocean south west of Bear Island, Norway (73°24′N 15°32′E) by a Fairey Swordfish aircraft of 842 Squadron, Fleet Air Arm, based on HMS Fencer (Royal Navy) with the loss of all 50 crew.
UJ 209	Kriegsmarine	World War II: The submarine chaser, a former Gabbiano-class corvette, was sunk at Breda di Piave, Veneto, Italy by Allied aircraft. Later raised.
USS YP-95	United States Navy	The yard patrol boat ran aground and sank in Beyer Bay, Adak, Alaska.

== 2 May ==
List of shipwrecks: 2 May 1944
Ship	State	Description
Amagi Maru	Japan	World War II: The cargo ship was torpedoed and damaged in the Andaman Sea by HMS Tantalus (Royal Navy). Torpedoed again the next day and sunk 40 nautical miles (74 km) south of Port Blair, Andaman Islands (10°54′N 93°12′E). Four troops were killed. Survivors rescued by Kyo Maru No. 1 (Imperial Japanese Navy).
O 7	Germany	The decommissioned O 7-class submarine, that had been sold for scrap, was captured by the Germans in May 1940 but was not used/commissioned due to her age and remained laid up. She sprung a leak and sank at her moorings at Den Helder. Raised and scrapped at an unknown date.
USS Parrott	United States Navy	The Clemson-class destroyer was in collision with the Liberty ship John Morton (United States) at Norfolk, Virginia and was beached. Severely damaged, she was not repaired.
Ryoyo Maru	Imperial Japanese Army	World War II: The cargo ship was torpedoed and sunk in the Kuril Islands (48°04′N 153°16′E) by USS Tautog (United States Navy).
U-674	Kriegsmarine	World War II: The Type VIIC submarine was sunk in the Arctic Ocean near Narvik, Norway (70°32′N 4°37′E) by a rocket attack from a Fairey Swordfish aircraft of 842 Squadron, Fleet Air Arm based on HMS Fencer (Royal Navy) with the loss of all 49 crew.
U-959	Kriegsmarine	World War II: The Type VIIC submarine was depth charged and sunk in the Arctic Ocean south east of Jan Mayen, Norway (69°20′N 0°20′W) by a Fairey Swordfish aircraft of 842 Squadron, Fleet Air Arm, based on HMS Fencer (Royal Navy) with the loss of all 53 crew.

== 3 May ==
List of shipwrecks: 3 May 1944
Ship	State	Description
USS Donnell	United States Navy	World War II: Convoy CU 22: The Buckley-class destroyer escort was torpedoed and damaged in the Atlantic Ocean 450 nautical miles (830 km) south west of Cape Clear Island, County Cork, Ireland (47°48′N 19°55′W) by U-473 (Kriegsmarine) with the loss of 29 of her 213 crew. She was taken in tow and arrived at Dunnstafnage Bay, Scotland on 12 May. Declared a constructive total loss, she was subsequently used as an accommodation ship at Lisahally, County Londonderry, Northern Ireland.
Fushima Maru	Japan	World War II: The cargo ship was torpedoed and sunk in the Kuril Islands by USS Tautog (United States Navy).
Kenan Maru	Japan	World War II: The cargo ship was torpedoed and sunk in the Pacific Ocean north west of Saipan by USS Sand Lance (United States Navy).
SM 103	Kriegsmarine	The KSK-2-class naval drifter/submarine chaser was sunk on this date.
Shingu Maru	Japan	World War II: The cargo ship was bombed and sunk in the South China Sea south west of Takao, Formosa by Consolidated B-24 Liberator aircraft of the United States Fourteenth Air Force.
Teisen Maru	Japan	World War II: The transport was torpedoed and sunk in the Sulu Sea (12°54′N 114°07′E) by USS Flasher (United States Navy). Her crew of 93, (6 Japanese, 27 Germans and 60 Chinese), sailed in lifeboats to French Indochina arriving on 9 May. 9 passengers seem to have been lost.
U-852	Kriegsmarine	World War II: The Type IXD2 submarine was depth charged and damaged in the Arabian Sea by six Vickers Wellington aircraft of 8 and 621 Squadrons, Royal Air Force. She was beached on the coast of Italian East Africa at 9°32′N 50°59′E with the loss of seven on her 66 crew. Survivors were taken as prisoners of war by the Somaliland Camel Corps.
UJ-2304	Kriegsmarine	World War II: The auxiliary sub chaser was bombed and sunk by a Soviet Naval Air Force Douglas A-20 Havoc aircraft in the Black Sea.

== 4 May ==
List of shipwrecks: 4 May 1944
Ship	State	Description
Daibu Maru	Japan	World War II: Convoy TE-04: The iron ore carrier was torpedoed and sunk in the East China Sea west of the Bashi Channel (20°50′N 117°55′E) by USS Tinosa (United States Navy). A gunner was killed. Survivors were rescued by Kazan Maru (Imperial Japanese Navy).
Daiyoku Maru	Japan	World War II: Convoy TE-04: The Type 1K Standard Merchant ore carrier (a.k.a. Taiyoku Maru) was torpedoed and sunk in the East China Sea west of the Bashi Channel (20°50′N 117°55′E) by USS Parche (United States Navy). Fifteen gunners, two passengers and twelve crewmen were killed.
Eiryu Maru	Imperial Japanese Navy	World War II: The Eiryu Maru-class auxiliary minesweeper was torpedoed, exploded, and sank in the Philippine Sea 162 miles (261 km) east of Davao, Mindanao, Philippines (07°14′N 129°12′E) by USS Pargo (United States Navy) with the loss of four crewmen.
HMS Elgin	Royal Navy	World War II: The Hunt-class minesweeper (710/930 t, 1919) struck a mine in the English Channel nine nautical miles (17 km; 10 mi) east of the Isle of Portland, Dorset. She was taken in to Portsmouth, Hampshire but was not repaired.
Kinrei Maru	Japan	World War II: Convoy TE-04: The Kinrei Maru-class ore carrier was torpedoed and sunk in the East China Sea west of the Bashi Channel (20°50′N 117°55′E) by USS Bang (United States Navy). Six crewmen were killed.
Sapporo Maru	Imperial Japanese Navy	World War II: The Yatsushiro Maru-class naval trawler/auxiliary storeship was sunk in Truk Lagoon north of Fefan Island, (31°30′N 125°57′E) in an air raid by Consolidated B-24 Liberator aircraft of VB-109, United States Navy, or by Task Force 58 carrier aircraft. Two crew members were killed.
Shoryu Maru	Japan	World War II: Convoy TE-04: The iron ore carrier was torpedoed and sunk in the East China Sea (20°50′N 117°55′E) by USS Parche (United States Navy). Two gunners, twenty passengers and 42 crewmen were killed.
Taibu Maru	Japan	World War II: The cargo ship was torpedoed and sunk in the Luzon Strait south of Formosa by USS Tinosa (United States Navy).
Taiyoku Maru	Japan	World War II: The cargo ship was torpedoed and sunk in the Luzon Strait south of Formosa by USS Parche (United States Navy).
Tajima Maru	Imperial Japanese Navy	World War II: The guard ship/trawler was shelled and sunk in the Pacific Ocean north of Wake Island by USS Tuna (United States Navy). At least two crew survived.
Toyohi Maru	Japan	World War II: Convoy TE-04: The iron ore carrier was torpedoed and sunk in the East China Sea west of the Bashi Channel (20°50′N 118°00′E) by USS Tinosa (United States Navy). Sixteen gunners, fifteen watchmen, and 56 crewmen were killed.
U-371	Kriegsmarine	World War II: The Type VIIC submarine was depth charged and damaged in the Mediterranean Sea off Constantine, Algeria (37°49′N 5°39′E) by HMS Blankney (Royal Navy), L'Alcyon, Sénégalais (both Free French Naval Forces), USS Joseph E. Campbell and USS Pride (both United States Navy). She surfaced and was scuttled with the loss of two of her 52 crew.
U-846	Kriegsmarine	World War II: The Type IXC/40 submarine was depth charged and sunk in the Bay of Biscay north of Cape Ortegal, Spain (46°04′N 9°20′W) by a Vickers Wellington aircraft on 407 Squadron, Royal Canadian Air Force with the loss of all 57 crew.

== 5 May ==
List of shipwrecks: 5 May 1944
Ship	State	Description
USS Fechteler	United States Navy	World War II: Convoy GUS 38: The Buckley-class destroyer escort was torpedoed and sunk in the Mediterranean Sea (36°07′N 2°40′W) by U-967 (Kriegsmarine) with the loss of 29 of her 215 crew. Survivors were rescued by USS Laning (United States Navy) and other ships.
HMS MTB 708	Royal Navy	World War II: The Fairmile D motor torpedo boat (102/118 t, 1943) was bombed by aircraft of Coastal Command, Royal Air Force, and then shelled and sunk by Allied warships in the English Channel.
USS PT-247	United States Navy	World War II: The Higgins 78'-class PT boat was sunk by Imperial Japanese Navy barges and shore batteries off Bougainville Island (06°38′S 156°01′E).
Shirane Maru	Japan	World War II: The transport ship was torpedoed and sunk in the Pacific Ocean off Honshu by USS Pogy (United States Navy.
UJ 2318	Kriegsmarine	The KSK-2-class naval drifter/submarine chaser was wrecked on this date.

== 6 May ==
List of shipwrecks: 6 May 1944
Ship	State	Description
Aden Maru	Imperial Japanese Army	World War II: Take Ichi convoy: The Daifuku Maru No. 1-class transport ship was torpedoed and sunk in the Celebes Sea (02°42′N 124°07′E) by USS Gurnard (United States Navy). A total of 499 troops, four gunners and twelve crewmen were killed.
Almora	Germany	World War II: The cargo ship (2,433 GRT, 1905) was torpedoed and sunk in the Norwegian Sea off Hustadvika, Norway by Fairey Barracuda, and Supermarine Seafire aircraft based on HMS Furious and Grumman Wildcat aircraft based on HMS Searcher (both Royal Navy). Eight crew were killed.
Anadyr	United Kingdom	World War II: The cargo ship (5,278 GRT, 1930) was torpedoed and sunk in the Atlantic Ocean 600 nautical miles (1,100 km) south east of Recife, Brazil (10°55′S 27°30′W) by U-129 (Kriegsmarine) with the loss of six of her 53 crew.
Eduard Geiss	Germany	World War II: The cargo ship was bombed and sunk in the North Sea off Borkum, Lower Saxony by British aircraft.
F 132	Kriegsmarine	World War II: The Type A Marinefahrprahm was bombed and set on fire by Soviet aircraft off Sebastopol and was later sunk by own artillery.
Nisshin Maru	Imperial Japanese Navy	World War II: Convoy MI-02: The tanker was torpedoed and sunk south of Balibac Island (07°19′N 116°52′E) by USS Crevalle (United States Navy). Fifteen crewmen were killed.
Saarburg	Germany	World War II: The tanker was torpedoed and sunk in the Norwegian Sea by Fairey Barracuda and Supermarine Seafire aircraft based on HMS Furious and Grumman Wildcat aircraft based on HMS Searcher (both Royal Navy).
Tazima Maru	Imperial Japanese Army	World War II: Take Ichi convoy: The Toyohashi Maru-class auxiliary transport was torpedoed and sunk in the Celebes Sea (02°42′N 124°07′E) by USS Gurnard (United States Navy). Fifty-eight troops, nine gunners and three crewmen were killed.
Tenshinzan Maru	Japan	World War II: Take Ichi convoy: The cargo liner (a.k.a. Amatsuzan Maru) was torpedoed, shelled, and torpedoed again and sunk in the Celebes Sea by USS Gurnard (United States Navy). Ninety-five troops were killed.
Tento	Germany	World War II: The cargo ship (4,917 GRT, 1921) struck a mine and sank in Kiel Bay, Germany. The wreck was subsequently dispersed by explosives.
Toyoura Maru	Japan	World War II: Convoy TAMO-18: The cargo ship was torpedoed and sunk in the East China Sea north of the Ryukyu Islands (32°16′N 127°08′E) by USS Spearfish (United States Navy). Three passengers and 32 crewmen were killed.
U-66	Kriegsmarine	World War II: The Type IXC submarine was depth charged in the Atlantic Ocean west of the Cape Verde Islands (17°17′N 32°29′W) by aircraft based on USS Block Island (United States Navy). She was then rammed and sunk by USS Buckley (United States Navy) with the loss of 24 of her 60 crew.
U-473	Kriegsmarine	World War II: The Type VIIC submarine was sunk in the Atlantic Ocean south-west of Ireland (49°29′N 21°22′W) by HMS Starling, HMS Wild Goose and HMS Wren (all Royal Navy) with the loss of 23 of her 53 crew.
U-765	Kriegsmarine	World War II: The Type VIIC submarine was depth charged and sunk in the Atlantic Ocean (52°30′N 28°28′W) by two Fairey Swordfish aircraft of 825 Squadron, Fleet Air Arm, based on HMS Vindex and also by HMS Aylmer, HMS Bickerton and HMS Bligh (all Royal Navy) with the loss of 37 of her 48 crew.
UJ 2314	Kriegsmarine	The KSK-2-class naval drifter/submarine chaser was sunk on this date.

== 7 May ==
List of shipwrecks: 7 May 1944
Ship	State	Description
Moder II	Norway	World War II: The fishing cutter (124 GRT, 1870) was intercepted and captured in Varangerfjord, Norway, by TK-215, TK-218, and TK-219 (all Soviet Navy). She was set on fire and sunk. All fifteen people on board were taken as prisoners by the motor torpedo boats.
Rossbach	Kriegsmarine	World War II: The tanker (5,894 GRT, 1917) was torpedoed and sunk in the Kii Channel (33°14′N 134°40′E) by USS Burrfish (United States Navy).
HMCS Valleyfield	Royal Canadian Navy	World War II: Convoy ONM 234: The River-class frigate (1,445/2,115 t, 1943) was torpedoed and sunk in the Atlantic Ocean south east of Cape Race, Newfoundland (at 46°03′N 52°24′W), by U-548 (Kriegsmarine) with the loss of 129 of her 167 crew. Survivors were rescued by HMCS Giffard (Royal Canadian Navy).

== 8 May ==
List of shipwrecks: 8 May 1944
Ship	State	Description
Bizon	Germany	World War II: The cargo ship was sunk off the Corbière Lighthouse, Jersey Channel Islands by motor torpedo boats 91, 92, 227 and 229 (Free French Naval Forces).
Cordelia	Germany	World War II: The tanker struck a mine and sank in the Adriatic Sea off Venice, Italy.
Cornelis Anni	Kriegsmarine	World War II: The motorboat was sunk in the Black Sea by Soviet motor torpedo boats or Soviet artillery.
Dagö	Kriegsmarine	World War II: The Peilboot struck a mine and sank in the Jade Bight.
Elbe V	Kriegsmarine	World War II: The barge was torpedoed and sunk in the Black Sea by Soviet Red Army artillery.
G 3102	Kriegsmarine	World War II: The motorboat was damaged by Soviet artillery and was scuttled in the Black Sea.
Kunikawa Maru	Imperial Japanese Navy	World War II: The Kamikawa Maru-class auxiliary transport struck a mine at Balikpapan and was grounded. After being refloated she was repaired, work finished on 26 September 1944.
Miyazaki Maru	Japan	World War II: The cargo ship was torpedoed and sunk in the Pacific Ocean by USS Tautog (United States Navy).
Poseidone	Kriegsmarine	World War II: The tanker struck a mine and sank off Punta Sabbioni, Italy. She was refloated in 1945-46, repaired and returned to service.
TK-217	Soviet Navy	World War II: The A-2 (Higgins 78')-class motor torpedo boat was sunk by V 6107 (Kriegsmarine). Two crewmen were killed, the rest of crew rescued by TK-209 (Soviet Navy)."
V 1701 Unitas 2	Kriegsmarine	World War II: The Vorpostenboot (341 GRT) was sunk in Narva Bay by a damaged Ilyushin Il-2 aircraft that crashed into it during an attack. The whole German crew survived, with only two wounded.

== 9 May ==
List of shipwrecks: 9 May 1944
Ship	State	Description
Delfin 1	Kriegsmarine	The Delfin 1-class motor patrol boat was sunk on this date.
MO-435	Soviet Navy	The MO-230 (PTc)-class motor launch was sunk on this date.
MO-437	Soviet Navy	The MO-230 (PTc)-class motor launch was sunk on this date.
MO-439	Soviet Navy	The MO-230 (PTc)-class motor launch was sunk on this date.
MO-443	Soviet Navy	The MO-230 (PTc)-class motor launch was sunk on this date.
Odin	Germany	World War II: The cargo ship struck a mine and sank in the Norwegian Sea off Narvik, Norway.
USS PC-558	United States Navy	World War II: The PC-461-class submarine chaser (335 GRT) was torpedoed and sunk in the Mediterranean Sea northeast of Palermo (38°41′N 13°43′E) by U-230 (Kriegsmarine) with the loss of 29 of her 64 crew. Survivors were rescued by USS PC-1235 (United States Navy).
Prodromos	Germany	World War II: Crimean Offensive: The cargo ship was shelled and sunk in the Black Sea off Cherson, Soviet Union by shore-based artillery.
Sturmfogel	Germany	World War II: Crimean Offensive: The motor boat foundered in a storm in the Black Sea while evacuating troops.
T-886	Soviet Navy	World War II: The auxiliary minesweeper was sunk by German aircraft in Kola Bay. 28 crew and 35 troops were killed.
TK-209	Soviet Navy	World War II: The A-2 (Higgins 78')-class motor torpedo boat exploded and sank, probably from battle damage from the previous day's battle with V 6101, V 6102, V 6107, and V 6108 (all Kriegsmarine). Three people killed.
TK-304	Soviet Navy	World War II: The G-5-class motor torpedo boat was sunk by a mine off Yalta, Crimea with the loss of four lives.
UJ-2314	Kriegsmarine	World War II: The auxiliary submarine chaser was bombed and sunk by a Soviet Naval Air Force Douglas A-20 Havoc aircraft in the Black Sea.

== 10 May ==
List of shipwrecks: 10 May 1944
Ship	State	Description
BK-413	Soviet Navy	The Project 1124/No. 41-class armored motor gunboat was lost on this date.
Choan Maru No. 2 Go	Imperial Japanese Navy	World War II: The Chojo Maru-class auxiliary transport was torpedoed and sunk in the Pacific Ocean 120 nautical miles (220 km; 140 mi) south south west of Guam, Marianas Islands (11°31′N 143°41′E) by USS Silversides (United States Navy). 41 crewmen and 12 passengers were killed. The survivors were rescued by CH-30 (Imperial Japanese Navy).
Karukaya	Imperial Japanese Navy	World War II: Convoy MI-03: The Wakatake-class destroyer was torpedoed and sunk in the South China Sea 150 miles (240 km) northwest of Manila (15°47′N 119°32′E) by USS Cod (United States Navy). 13 crewmen were killed and 60 missing.
Keiyo Maru	Japan	World War II: The aircraft transporter was torpedoed and sunk in the Pacific Ocean north west of Saipan by USS Tambor (United States Navy).
Mikage Maru No. 18	Imperial Japanese Navy	World War II: The Mikagi Maru No. 18-class auxiliary collier/oiler was torpedoed and sunk in the Pacific Ocean 120 nautical miles (220 km; 140 mi) south south west of Guam, Marianas Islands (11°31′N 143°41′E) by USS Silversides (United States Navy). 14 crewmen were killed. The survivors were rescued by CH-30 (Imperial Japanese Navy).
Okinawa Maru	Imperial Japanese Navy	World War II: The requisitioned transport ship was torpedoed and sunk in the Pacific Ocean 120 nautical miles (220 km; 140 mi) south south west of Guam, Marianas Islands (11°31′N 143°41′E) by USS Silversides (United States Navy). 15 crewmen were killed. The survivors were rescued by CH-30 (Imperial Japanese Navy).
PiLB 319	Kriegsmarine	World War II: The PiLB 40 type landing craft sank in the Black Sea between Sevastopol and Sulina due to overloading and damage, but most of the soldiers aboard were rescued.
PiLB 402	Kriegsmarine	World War II: The PiLB 40 type landing craft was sunk by Soviet fighter-bombers off Sevastopol. Her whole crew was posted missing.
Patria	Sweden	World War II: The schooner struck a mine and sank off Møn, Denmark.
Rossano	Germany	World War II: The cargo ship was sunk in an Allied air raid on Genoa, Italy. The wreck was broken up in 1946.
SF 287	Kriegsmarine	World War II: The Siebel ferry was attacked by Allied fighter-bomber aircraft in the port of Rogač, Croatia and was destroyed by fire.
Shohei Maru	Japan	World War II: Convoy MI-03: The transport was torpedoed and sunk in the South China Sea 150 nautical miles (280 km) northwest of Manila (15°47′N 119°32′E) by USS Cod (United States Navy). Twelve passengers and eight crewmen were killed.
StuBo 1007, StuBo 1011, StuBo 1013 and StuBo 1075	Kriegsmarine	World War II: The StuBo42 type landing crafts were sunk by Soviet aircraft and artillery fire off Sebastopol.
Teja	Germany	World War II: Crimean Offensive: The transport was bombed and sunk in the Black Sea by Soviet Naval Air Force Douglas A-20 Havoc aircraft and by aircraft of the Soviet Fourth Air Army and Eighth Air Army. About 3,600 German and Romanian troops on board lost their lives.
Totila	Germany	World War II: Crimean Offensive: The transport was bombed and sunk in the Black Sea by Soviet Naval Air Force Douglas A-20 Havoc aircraft and by aircraft of the Soviet Fourth Air Army and Eighth Air Army. Up to 5,000 German and Romanian troops on board lost their lives.

== 11 May ==
List of shipwrecks: 11 May 1944
Ship	State	Description
Choi Maru	Imperial Japanese Navy	World War II: The Choi Maru-class auxiliary transport ship was torpedoed and set on fire, sinking the next day in the Banda Sea off the south west coast of Buru Island (03°28′S 126°03′E) by USS Rasher (United States Navy). 22 crewmen were killed.
Danubius	Romania	World War II: Crimean Offensive: The transport ship was sunk in the Black Sea by aircraft of the Soviet Fourth Air Army and Eighth Air Army.
Empire Heath	United Kingdom	World War II: The cargo ship (6,643 GRT) was torpedoed and sunk in the South Atlantic (approximately 29°31′S 29°50′W) by U-129 (Kriegsmarine) with the loss of her master, a passenger, nine gunners and 46 crewmen. The only survivor was taken on board U-129 as a prisoner of war.
Helga	Germany	World War II: Crimean Offensive: The transport ship (1,620 GRT, 1919) was bombed and sunk in the Black Sea off Sevastopol by aircraft of the Soviet Fourth Air Army and Eighth Air Army.
Marin II	Yugoslav Partisans	World War II: The hospital boat was sunk by S 30, S 36, and S 61 (all Kriegsmarine). 59 wounded on board, including a German officer who was a prisoner of war, were killed. Four survivors, including her commanding officer, were rescued by NB-3, NB-8, and PC-57 (all Yugoslav Partisans).
Mitakesan Maru	Imperial Japanese Navy	World War II: The Toyo Maru-class auxiliary transport (a.k.a. Mitsukesan Maru) was torpedoed and sunk in the Pacific Ocean 20 nautical miles (37 km) west of Lolo Point, Saipan (14°57′N 145°30′E) by USS Sand Lance (United States Navy). A crewman was killed.
Sabine Howaldt	Germany	World War II: The cargo ship (5,956 GRT) struck a mine and sank in the North Sea off Borkum, Lower Saxony (53°35′N 6°15′E). There were no casualties.
Seiryu Maru	Japan	World War II: Convoy No. 4510: The cargo ship was torpedoed and sunk in the Pacific Ocean off the Bonin Islands (25°50′N 141°50′E) by USS Sturgeon (United States Navy). A total of 131 construction troops, seven gunners and nine crewmen were killed.
UJ-104	Germany	World War II: Crimean Offensive: The auxiliary submarine chaser was torpedoed and sunk in the Black Sea by TK-353 (Soviet Navy).
V 1311 Döse	Kriegsmarine	World War II: The Vorpostenboot was torpedoed and sunk in the North Sea off Hook of Holland, South Holland, Netherlands by Royal Navy motor torpedo boats.
V 6113 Gote	Kriegsmarine	World War II: The Vorpostenboot was torpedoed and sunk in the Barents Sea off Tana, Norway by Ilyushin Il-4 aircraft of the Soviet Ninth Guards Regiment. 11 of her 67 crew were killed and 21 wounded.
USS YF-415	United States Navy	The self-propelled covered lighter was sunk by an explosion off the east coast of the United States.

== 12 May ==
List of shipwrecks: 12 May 1944
Ship	State	Description
Argentea	Italy	World War II: The cargo ship was sunk in an Allied air raid on Genoa. She was later refloated and scrapped.
Asia	Italy	World War II: The cargo ship was sunk in an Allied air raid on Genoa.
Banei Maru No.2	Japan	World War II: The cargo ship was torpedoed and sunk in the Pacific Ocean by USS Tautog (United States Navy).
Docelitas	Italy	World War II: The cargo ship was sunk in an Allied air raid on Genoa.
Durostor	Royal Romanian Navy	World War II: The auxiliary minelayer was sunk in the Black Sea (44°37′N 31°57′E) by Soviet aircraft. All were rescued but two crew died of their wounds.
F 130	Kriegsmarine	World War II: The Type A Marinefahrprahm was damaged by Soviet aircraft, abandoned, and later captured by S-33 (Soviet Navy) that later scuttled her by shelling.
F 709	Kriegsmarine	World War II: The Type MZ-A Marinefährprahm was sunk at La Spezia, Italy by an American air raid. She was raised and returned to service.
Geiserich	Germany	World War II: Crimean Offensive: The cargo ship was bombed and damaged in the Black Sea by aircraft of the Soviet Fourth Air Army and Eighth Air Army. She was towed to Constanța but was declared a total loss.
Kasumi Maru	Imperial Japanese Navy	World War II: The auxiliary transport ship struck a mine and sank in the Malacca Strait about 20 nautical miles (37 km; 23 mi) north east of Tanjung, Sumatra (03°24′S 99°29′E).
Marco Polo	Germany	World War II: The ocean liner was scuttled at La Spezia, Italy. She was refloated in 1949 and scrapped in 1950.
Romania	Kriegsmarine	World War II: Crimean Offensive: The auxiliary cruiser was bombed and sunk in Cherson by aircraft of the Soviet Fourth Air Army and Eighth Air Army. All crew and passengers were saved.
Shohei Maru	Imperial Japanese Navy	World War II: Convoy MI-03: The Shohei Maru-class auxiliary transport ship (7,255 GRT, 1931) was torpedoed and sunk about 27 nautical miles (50 km; 31 mi) off Luzon's west coast, off Masinloc (15°47′N 119°32′E) by USS Cod (United States Navy). 13 crewmen were killed, 60 were reported missing.
SKA-0376	Soviet Navy	World War II: The MO-class minesweeper was torpedoed and sunk in the Black Sea (41°58′N 41°27′E) by U-24 (Kriegsmarine). There were 20 dead and 1 survivor.
TS-3	Kriegsmarine	World War II: The torpedo training ship was sunk by a mine in the Baltic Sea north of Darßer Ort, Germany. A cargo ship rescued 47 crew.
UJ 309	Kriegsmarine	World War II: The KSK-2-class naval drifter/submarine chaser was sunk by Soviet aircraft off Sebastopol.>
UJ 310	Kriegsmarine	World War II: The KSK-2-class naval drifter/submarine chaser was sunk by Soviet aircraft off Sebastopol.

== 13 May ==
List of shipwrecks: 13 May 1944
Ship	State	Description
AF 73	Kriegsmarine	World War II: The Artilleriefährprahm struck a mine and sank in the North Sea off Walcheren.
Awa Maru	Japan	World War II: The cargo ship was torpedoed and sunk in the Pacific Ocean off Honshu by USS Pogy (United States Navy.
BT-V	Sweden	World War II: The tanker was sunk by a bombardment at Stettin, Germany. Four crew were killed.
Gisela	Germany	World War II: The auxiliary sailing vessel was sunk at Rhodes, Greece by British aircraft.
I-48	Soviet Navy	The KM-class motor launch was lost on this date.
Johann Faulbaum	Germany	World War II: The cargo ship was bombed and sunk by Royal Air Force aircraft at Jarfjord near Kirkenes, Norway.
Magda	flag unknown	World War II: The boat was sunk off Symi, Greece by British aircraft.
MO-404	Soviet Navy	World War II: The MO-4-class patrol vessel was sunk by German aircraft in the Gulf of Finland. 12 crew were killed.
R 215	Kriegsmarine	World War II: The minesweeper was sunk by Allied fighter-bombers at Chiavari, Italy with the loss of 5 lives.
Ro-501	Imperial Japanese Navy	World War II: The Type IXC/40 submarine (a.k.a. Satsuki No. 2) was depth charged and sunk in the Atlantic Ocean south of the Azores, Portugal (18°07′59″N 33°12′59″W) by USS Francis M. Robinson (United States Navy) with the loss of all 52 crew.
S 141	Kriegsmarine	World War II: The Schnellboot was shelled and sunk in the English Channel off Selsey Bill, Sussex, United Kingdom by La Combattante (Free French Naval Forces). There were 20 killed and 6 survivors.
TK-27	Soviet Navy	The D-3-class motor torpedo boat was lost on this date.

== 14 May ==
List of shipwrecks: 14 May 1944
Ship	State	Description
Bisan Maru	Japan	World War II: The transport (a.k.a. Miyama Maru) was torpedoed and sunk in the Pacific Ocean north north west of Palau by USS Bowfin and USS Aspro (both United States Navy). Eighty-three civilian refugees and two crewmen were killed. Survivors were rescued by Jokuja Maru (Japan).
Inazuma	Imperial Japanese Navy	World War II: The Fubuki-class destroyer was torpedoed and sunk in the Celebes Sea off Tawitawi (5°08′N 119°38′E) by USS Bonefish (United States Navy) with the loss of 161 lives. 121 or 125 survivors were rescued by Hibiki (Imperial Japanese Navy).
Koho Maru	Imperial Japanese Army	World War II: Convoy 3503: The Type 1B Standard Peacetime cargo ship was torpedoed and sunk in the Pacific Ocean south west of Apra (13°43′N 144°42′E) by USS Sand Lance (United States Navy). Seven gunners and 43 crewmen were killed.
M 435	Kriegsmarine	World War II: The minesweeper was attacked off Schiermonnikoog, Friesland, Netherlands by rocket-armed Bristol Beaufighter aircraft of Coastal Command, Royal Air Force. She was taken under tow by M 369 (Kriegsmarine) but consequently sank.
MO-122	Soviet Navy	World War II: The MO-class minesweeper was sunk in the Baltic Sea by Schnellboots (Kriegsmarine). Nine crewmen were killed.
Patagonia	Kriegsmarine	World War II: The transport ship was bombed and severely damaged at Kirkenes, Norway by Soviet aircraft.
Schlei	Germany	World War II: The tug struck a mine and sank in the Kiel Canal west of Rendsburg, Schleswig-Holstein.
U-1234	Kriegsmarine	The Type IXC/40 submarine collided with the tug Anton (Germany) at Gotenhafen, Pomerania and sank. There were 13 dead and 35 survivors. She was later raised and repaired. Returned to service in October 1944.
Vesta	Netherlands	World War II: The cargo ship was bombed and sunk in the North Sea north of Terschelling, Friesland, Netherlands by Bristol Beaufighter aircraft of No. 236 Squadron RAF and No. 254 Squadron RAF. There were ten dead and 17 survivors.

== 15 May ==
List of shipwrecks: 15 May 1944
Ship	State	Description
Jokuja Maru	Imperial Japanese Army	World War II: The Standard Type 1A transport (a.k.a. Djokja Maru) was torpedoed and sunk in the Pacific Ocean north northwest of Palau (10°10′N 131°32′E) by USS Aspro (United States Navy). Seven gunners and four crewmen were killed.
USS LCT-984	United States Navy	The landing craft tank was being transported as deck cargo on a landing ship tank when it broke lose in heavy seas, fell overboard and was swamped off the Hawaii Territory. She was scuttled by USS PC-1079 (United States Navy).
USS LCT-988	United States Navy	The landing craft tank was being transported as deck cargo on a landing ship tank when it broke lose in heavy seas, fell overboard and sank off Hawaii Territory.
R-179	Kriegsmarine	World War II: The Type R-151 minesweeper was sunk off Le Havre, Seine-Maritime, France by a mine.
Seiei Maru No. 2 Go	Imperial Japanese Navy	The auxiliary guard boat was lost on this date.
Sipan	Kriegsmarine	World War II: The coaster was sunk by Allied aircraft in Jansko cove near Slano, Yugoslavia. Raised by Yugoslavia, repaired and returned to service post War.
U-731	Kriegsmarine	World War II: The Type VIIC submarine was depth charged and sunk in the Atlantic Ocean by two Consolidated PBY Catalina aircraft of the United States Navy and also by HMT Blackfly and HMS Kilmarnock (both Royal Navy) with the loss of all 54 crew.

== 16 May ==
List of shipwrecks: 16 May 1944
Ship	State	Description
I-176	Imperial Japanese Navy	World War II: The Kaidai-class submarine was depth charged and sunk in the Pacific Ocean off Buka Island, Solomon Islands (4°01′S 15°29′E) by USS Franks, USS Haggard and USS Johnston (all United States Navy) with the loss of all 86 crew.
U-616	Kriegsmarine	World War II: The Type VIIC submarine was depth charged and damaged in the Mediterranean Sea east of Cartagena, Spain by USS Ellyson, USS Emmons, USS Gleaves, USS Hambleton, USS Macomb, USS Nields and USS Rodman (all United States Navy) and by a Vickers Wellington aircraft of 36 Squadron, Royal Air Force. She was consequently scuttled the next day at 36°46′N 0°52′E due to damage received. All 53 crew survived, 30 of them were rescued by USS Ellyson.
UJ 1210 Zeebrügge	Kriegsmarine	World War II: The Tirol-class naval whaler/submarine chaser was sunk off Varangerfjord by Soviet aircraft. Six crew were killed and 11 wounded.

== 17 May ==
List of shipwrecks: 17 May 1944
Ship	State	Description
F 4754	Kriegsmarine	The MZ-A landing craft was sunk on this date.
Hukko Maru	Japan	World War II: Convoy 3503: The transport ship was torpedoed and sunk in the Pacific Ocean(14°55′N 142°30′E) by USS Sand Lance (United States Navy). A soldier, a gunner and nine crewmen were killed.
M 3614 Toewijding	Kriegsmarine	The auxiliary minesweeper was lost on this date.
Nichiwa Maru	Japan	World War II: Convoy 3503: The transport was torpedoed and sunk in the Pacific Ocean (14°5′N 142°40′E) by USS Tunny (United States Navy). A total of 324 troops, a gunner and six crewmen were killed.
Shinrei Maru	Japan	World War II: The transport was bombed and sunk at Surabaya by aircraft from HMS Illustrious (Royal Navy).
Taikoku Maru	Japan	World War II: Convoy 3503: The transport was torpedoed and sunk in the Pacific Ocean by USS Sand Lance (United States Navy). Two crewmen were killed.
Toryu Maru	Japan	The freighter ran aground and sank off Choshi.
U-616	Kriegsmarine	World War II: The Type IXC submarine was depth charged and sunk in the Mediterranean Sea off Algeria by USS Hilary P. Jones and three other vessels (all United States Navy).

== 18 May ==
List of shipwrecks: 18 May 1944
Ship	State	Description
HNLMS MTB 203 Arend	Royal Netherlands Navy	World War II: The White 73'-class motor torpedo boat struck a mine and sank in the English Channel off Boulogne, Pas-de-Calais, France. One crew was killed.
Shinryu Maru	Imperial Japanese Army	World War II: The Shinryu Maru-class auxiliary transport was torpedoed and sunk in the Sulu Sea (07°34′S 113°18′E) by USS Puffer (United States Navy). 12 passengers, 10 gunners and 11 crewmen were killed.
Zuiho Maru	Imperial Japanese Navy	World War II: The guard ship was sunk in the Pacific Ocean off Duke of York Island, New Guinea by Lockheed P-38 Lightning, Bell P-39 Airacobra and Curtiss P-40 Warhawk aircraft of the United States Army Air Force.

== 19 May ==
List of shipwrecks: 19 May 1944
Ship	State	Description
Baja	Kriegsmarine	The auxiliary river minelayer was sunk on this date.
Fort Missanabie	United Kingdom	World War II: Convoy HA 43: The Fort ship (7,147 GRT) was torpedoed and sunk in the Mediterranean Sea (38°20′N 16°38′E) by U-453 (Kriegsmarine) with the loss of twelve of her 60 crew. Survivors were rescued by Urania (Regia Marina) and Spero (Norway). She was the last ship sunk in the Mediterranean Sea by a Kriegsmarine U-boat.
Fukutoku Maru No. 1	Imperial Japanese Navy	The auxiliary guard boat (139 GRT) was lost on this date.
I-16	Imperial Japanese Navy	World War II: The Type C submarine (2,554 GRT) was hedgehogged and sunk in the Pacific Ocean 140 nautical miles (260 km) north west of Cape Alexander, Solomon Islands (05°10′S 158°10′E) by USS England (United States Navy) with the loss of all 107 hands.
Kehrwieder	Kriegsmarine	World War II: The minelayer was bombed and destroyed at La Spezia, Italy.
M 3121	Kriegsmarine	World War II: The KFK 2-class naval drifter/minesweeper was sunk in the Gulf of Finland by Soviet Ilyushin Il-2 aircraft.
Meisho Maru	Imperial Japanese Navy	World War II: The guard ship was torpedoed and sunk in the Pacific Ocean by USS Skate (United States Navy).
Shinko Maru No. 1 Go	Imperial Japanese Navy	The auxiliary guard boat was lost on this date.
U-960	Kriegsmarine	World War II: The Type VIIC submarine (1,070 GRT) was depth charged, shelled and sunk in the Mediterranean Sea north-west of Algiers (37°20′N 01°35′E) by USS Ludlow, USS Niblack (both United States Navy), Lockheed Ventura aircraft of 500 Squadron, Royal Air Force and Vickers Wellington aircraft of 36 Squadron, Royal Air Force with the loss of 31 of her 51 crew. Survivors were taken as prisoners of war.
U-1015	Kriegsmarine	The Type VIIC/41 submarine (1,070 GRT) collided with U-1014 (Kriegsmarine) and sank in the Baltic Sea west of Pillau, West Prussia (55°09′N 19°11′E) with the loss of 36 of her 50 crew.

== 20 May ==
List of shipwrecks: 20 May 1944
Ship	State	Description
F 251	Kriegsmarine	World War II: The Type A Marinefahrprahm was sunk by Allied aircraft at Dieppe, France.
HNLMS Marken	Royal Netherlands Navy	World War II: The MMS-class minesweeper struck a mine and sank in the Thames Estuary. Of the crew, 16 were killed and only 1 survived.
Miyaura Maru	Japan	World War II: The cargo ship (1,856 GRT) was torpedoed, blew up, broke in two and sank in the Pacific Ocean in the north end of the Morotai Strait between Halmahera and Morotai, Moloku Islands (2°14′N 128°05′E) by USS Bluegill (United States Navy). 96 passengers and 45 crewmen were killed.
Otori Maru	Imperial Japanese Navy	World War II: The Otori Maru-class auxiliary transport ship (2,105 GRT) was torpedoed and sunk in the Java Sea five nautical miles (9.3 km; 5.8 mi) off Semangka Bay, Sumatra (05°40′N 105°27′E) by USS Angler (United States Navy). Four crew were killed.
R 190	Kriegsmarine	World War II: The minesweeper (110 GRT) was sunk in the Strait of Otranto by Allied Supermarine Spitfire aircraft.
S 87	Kriegsmarine	World War II: The Schnellboot (93 GRT) was attacked by Fairey Swordfish aircraft in the North Sea off Ostend, West Flanders, Belgium and was set afire. She was taken in tow by S 83 (Kriegsmarine) but consequently sank. Her crew lost 3 dead, 1 missing and 9 wounded.
Shinju Maru	Japan	World War II: The cargo ship was bombed and sunk southwest of Hong Kong by Consolidated B-24 Liberator aircraft of the United States Fourteenth Air Force.
Soshei Maru	Japan	World War II: The coaster was torpedoed and sunk in the Pacific Ocean off the Marianas Islands by USS Silversides (United States Navy).
HMT Wyoming	Royal Navy	World War II: The 135-foot (41 m), 302-ton minesweeping naval trawler was sunk by a mine 20 nautical miles (37 km; 23 mi) east-north-east of Harwich, Essex near Buoy 54. Five crew were killed.
Yawata Maru	Imperial Japanese Navy	World War II: The guard ship was sunk in the Pacific Ocean 150 nautical miles (280 km) north of Marcus Island by aircraft based on USS San Jacinto (United States Navy).

== 21 May ==
List of shipwrecks: 21 May 1944
Ship	State	Description
Hochheimer	Germany	World War II: The cargo ship was torpedoed and sunk by HMS Sceptre (Royal Navy) off Santoña, Spain (43°42′N 3°30′W).
I-O-73	Kriegsmarine	The Siebelgefäß landing craft was lost on this date.
USS LCT-961	United States Navy	West Loch disaster: The Mk VI-class landing craft tank was lost as deck cargo on a landing ship tank which was lost at Pearl Harbor, Hawaii when mortar shells being offloaded from USS LST-353 exploded starting a chain of explosions and fires. Wreckage raised and resunk in deep water off Pearl Harbor.
USS LCT-963	United States Navy	West Loch disaster: The Mk VI-class landing craft tank was lost as deck cargo on a landing ship tank which was lost at Pearl Harbor when mortar shells being offloaded from USS LST-353 exploded starting a chain of explosions and fires. Wreckage raised and resunk in deep water off Pearl Harbor.
USS LCT-983	United States Navy	West Loch disaster: The Mk VI-class landing craft tank was lost as deck cargo on a landing ship tank which was lost at Pearl Harbor when mortar shells being offloaded from USS LST-353 exploded starting a chain of explosions and fires. Wreckage raised and resunk in deep water off Pearl Harbor.
USS LST-39	United States Navy	LST-39 and LST-480 still ablaze on 22 May 1944 West Loch disaster: The LST-1-class tank landing ship was sunk at Pearl Harbor when mortar shells being offloaded from USS LST-353 exploded starting a chain of explosions and fires. Wreckage raised and used as a barge.
USS LST-43	United States Navy	West Loch disaster: The LST-1-class tank landing ship was sunk at Pearl Harbor when mortar shells being offloaded from USS LST-353 exploded starting a chain of explosions and fires. Wreckage raised and resunk in deep water off Pearl Harbor.
USS LST-69	United States Navy	West Loch disaster: The LST-1-class tank landing ship was sunk at Pearl Harbor when mortar shells being offloaded from USS LST-353 exploded starting a chain of explosions and fires. Wreckage raised and resunk in deep water off Pearl Harbor.
USS LST-179	United States Navy	West Loch disaster: The LST-1-class tank landing ship was sunk at Pearl Harbor, when mortar shells being offloaded from USS LST-353 exploded starting a chain of explosions and fires. Wreckage raised and resunk in deep water off Pearl Harbor.
USS LST-353	United States Navy	West Loch disaster: The LST-1-class tank landing ship was sunk at Pearl Harbor when mortar shells being offloaded exploded starting a chain of explosions and fires. Wreckage raised and resunk in deep water off Pearl Harbor.
USS LST-480	United States Navy	West Loch disaster: The LST-1-class tank landing ship was burned out at Pearl Harbor when mortar shells being offloaded from USS LST-353 exploded starting a chain of explosions and fires. She was beached and abandoned.
Saumur	Germany	The cargo ship was torpedoed and sunk in the Mediterranean Sea off Port-Vendres, Basses-Pyrénées, France by HMS Upstart (Royal Navy).
Shonan Maru No. 7	Imperial Japanese Navy	The auxiliary submarine chaser was sunk on this date.
Solbjørn	Norway	World War II: The coaster (145 GRT, 1916) struck a mine and sank in Follafjord, Norway.
Tolentino	Germany	World War II: The cargo ship was torpedoed and sunk in the Mediterranean Sea off Vendres, Hérault, France by HMS Upstart (Royal Navy).
U-453	Kriegsmarine	World War II: The Type VIIC submarine was depth charged and sunk in the Ionian Sea north east of Cape Spartivento, Calabria, Italy (38°13′N 16°30′E) by HMS Liddesdale, HMS Tenacious and HMS Termagant (all Royal Navy) with the loss of one of her 52 crew.

== 22 May ==
List of shipwrecks: 22 May 1944
Ship	State	Description
Asanagi	Imperial Japanese Navy	World War II: Convoy 4517: The Kamikaze-class destroyer was torpedoed and sunk in the Pacific Ocean 200 nautical miles (370 km) north west of Chichijima (28°20′N 138°57′E) by the submarine USS Pollack (United States Navy). Eighty-two crewmen were killed.
Campopisano	Italy	The cargo ship sank off Secche di Vada, cause unknown.
Hashidate	Imperial Japanese Navy	World War II: The gunboat was torpedoed and sunk by the submarine USS Picuda (United States Navy) in the South China Sea off Pratas Island at 21°08′N 117°20′E while towing the disabled passenger-cargo ship Tsukuba Maru. Casualties are unknown but her commanding officer was killed.
Kosho Maru	Imperial Japanese Navy	World War II: The Showa Maru-class auxiliary gunboat was torpedoed at the entrance to Panang Harbor (04°52′N 127°37′E) by the submarine HMS Sea Rover (Royal Navy). Kosho Maru sank under tow. Two crew were killed.
M 515	Kriegsmarine	World War II: The Type 1916 minesweeper struck a mine and sank in the Baltic Sea off Fehmarn, Schleswig-Holstein.
Ro-106	Imperial Japanese Navy	World War II: The Ro-100-class submarine was hedgehogged and sunk in the Pacific Ocean north of the Admiralty Islands (01°40′N 150°31′E) by the destroyer escort USS England (United States Navy) with all 49 hands.
SG 15	Kriegsmarine	World War II: The escort ship was torpedoed and sunk in the Mediterranean Sea by the submarine HMS Universal (Royal Navy).
Tempei Maru	Imperial Japanese Army	World War II: Convoy H-26: The Horaisan Maru-class auxiliary transport was torpedoed and sunk in Davao Gulf (05°16′S 128°08′E) by the submarine USS Ray (United States Navy). Eleven passengers, five gunners, and nineteen crewmen were killed.
Tsukuba Maru	Japan	World War II: The cargo ship's engine room was damaged by near misses from four Consolidated B-24 Liberator aircraft of the United States Fourteenth Air Force on 20 May. She was torpedoed and severely damaged in the South China Sea southwest of Luzon, Philippines (12°18′N 117°12′E) by USS Picuda (United States Navy) while being towed by Hashidate (Imperial Japanese Navy). She was finished off by United States Army Air Force aircraft the next day.
Ysère	Kriegsmarine	World War II: The gunboat was torpedoed and sunk in the Mediterranean Sea by the submarine HMS Universal (Royal Navy).

== 23 May ==
List of shipwrecks: 23 May 1944
Ship	State	Description
Baldur	Germany	World War II: The cargo ship was torpedoed and sunk while moored at Castro Urdiales, Spain by HMS Sceptre (Royal Navy). Three sailors (two German and a French) and a Spaniard were killed.
Greif	Kriegsmarine	World War II: The torpedo boat was bombed by aircraft and sank in the English Channel off Ouistreham, Calvados, France (49°21′N 00°19′W) while being towed away.
Koshin Maru	Japan	World War II: The coaster was torpedoed and sunk west of Sarawak, Borneo by USS Raton (United States Navy).
Lina Campanella	Germany	World War II: The cargo ship was bombed and severely damaged at Cres, Yugoslavia by Allied aircraft. She was captured by the Yugoslavs and used as a hulk until scrapped in 1950
M 3443	Kriegsmarine	The KSK-2-class naval drifter/minesweeper was sunk on this date.
M 4623 Ludwig Janssen	Kriegsmarine	World War II: The auxiliary minesweeper was sunk in the English Channel off Lézardrieux, Côtes du Nord, France by British aircraft. The whole crew survived, four being wounded.
R 208	Kriegsmarine	World War II: The minesweeper struck a mine laid by RAF aircraft and sank in the Danube near Batta. Three crew were killed.
Ro-104	Imperial Japanese Navy	World War II: The Ro-100-class submarine was hedgehogged and sunk in the Pacific Ocean north of the Admiralty Islands (01°20′N 149°20′E) by USS England (United States Navy).
Taijun Maru	Japan	World War II: Convoy H-26: The cargo ship was torpedoed and sunk in the Molucca Sea (02°42′N 128°08′E) by USS Cero and USS Ray (both United States Navy). Two gunners and three crewmen killed. Two Daihatsu landing barges were lost as cargo.
Wales Maru	Imperial Japanese Army	World War II: The Nanman Maru-class transport was torpedoed and sunk in the South China Sea (7°16′N 109°04′E) by USS Lapon (United States Navy). Fifty men of Unit 234, Independent Flight Corps and thirteen crewmen were killed.

== 24 May ==
List of shipwrecks: 24 May 1944
Ship	State	Description
Bizen Maru	Japan	World War II: The cargo ship was torpedoed and sunk in the South China Sea (07°30′N 109°08′E) by USS Lapon (United States Navy). Three guards and 22 crewmen were killed
F 451	Kriegsmarine	World War II: The Type C Marinefährprahm was torpedoed and sunk in the Tyrrhenian Sea off the coast of Corsica, France by USS PT-202, USS PT-213 and USS PT-218 (all United States Navy). Seven crew were killed.
F 749	Kriegsmarine	World War II: The Marinefährprahm was torpedoed and sunk in the Tyrrhenian Sea off the coast of Corsica by USS PT-202, USS PT-213 and USS PT-218 (all United States Navy). Two crew were killed.
Greif	Kriegsmarine	World War II: The torpedo boat was bombed by British aircraft and then collided with the torpedo boat Kondor (Kriegsmarine) and sank in the Seine Bay. Two crewmen were killed.
Iki	Imperial Japanese Navy	World War II: Convoy HI-63: The Etorofu-class escort ship was torpedoed and sunk in the South China Sea north of the Tambelan Islands by USS Raton (United States Navy). 160 crewmen were killed. The 18 survivors were rescued by Etorofu (Imperial Japanese Navy).
M 39	Kriegsmarine	World War II: The minesweeper was torpedoed and sunk in the English Channel west of Ouistreham, Calvados, France by HMMTB 354 and HMMTB 361 (both Royal Navy). 30 crew were killed.
Ro-116	Imperial Japanese Navy	World War II: The Ro-100-class submarine was hedgehogged and sunk in the Pacific Ocean north of the Admiralty Islands (00°53′N 149°14′E) by USS England (United States Navy) with all 56 hands aboard.
Tatekawa Maru	Imperial Japanese Navy	World War II: The tanker was torpedoed and sunk in the Celebes Sea (05°45′N 125°43′E) by USS Gurnard (United States Navy). Ten gunners and seventeen crewmen were killed.
U-476	Kriegsmarine	World War II: The Type VIIC submarine was depth charged and damaged in the Norwegian Sea off Trondheim, Norway by a Consolidated PBY Catalina aircraft of 210 Squadron, Royal Air Force with the loss of 34 of her 55 crew. She was scuttled the next day at 65°08′N 4°53′E by U-990 (Kriegsmarine), which rescued the survivors.
U-675	Kriegsmarine	World War II: The Type VIIC submarine was depth charged and sunk in the Norwegian Sea west of Ålesund, Norway (62°27′N 3°04′E) by a Short Sunderland aircraft of 4 Squadron, Royal Air Force with the loss of all 51 crew.
UJ 2223	Kriegsmarine	World War II: The Ape-class submarine chaser, a former Gabbiano-class corvette, was torpedoed and sunk off the Vada Rocks by USS PT-202, USS PT-213, and USS PT-218 (all United States Navy), or sunk by US aircraft at Genoa.
Werner Vinnen	Germany	World War II: The cargo ship struck a mine and sank in the Elbe Estuary off Vogelsand.

== 25 May ==
List of shipwrecks: 25 May 1944
Ship	State	Description
AF 12	Kriegsmarine	World War II: The Artilleriefährprahm was bombed off Dunkerque, Nord, France and capsized.
Basarabia	Kingdom of Romania	World War II: The tugboat was bombed and sunk by a Soviet Naval Air Force Douglas A-20 Havoc aircraft in the Black Sea.
Beilul	Germany	World War II: The Adua-class submarine was bombed and sunk at Monfalcone, Italy by Royal Air Force aircraft while being prepared for Kriegsmarine service.
F 924	Kriegsmarine	The Type DM minelayer Marinefahrprahm was sunk on this date.
F 928	Kriegsmarine	World War II: The incomplete Type D Marinefahrprahm was sunk incomplete at CRDA Shipyard, Monfalcone.
F 953	Kriegsmarine	World War II: The incomplete Type D Marinefahrprahm was sunk incomplete at CRDA Shipyard, Monfalcone.
F 954	Kriegsmarine	World War II: The incomplete Type D Marinefahrprahm was sunk incomplete at CRDA Shipyard, Monfalcone.
F 955	Kriegsmarine	World War II: The incomplete Type D Marinefahrprahm was sunk incomplete at CRDA Shipyard, Monfalcone.
M-39	Kriegsmarine	World War II: The minesweeper was torpedoed and sunk off Lion-sur-Mer, France by HMMTB 354 and HMMTB 361 (both (Royal Navy)).
Osaka Maru	Japan	World War II: The transport was torpedoed and sunk in the Pacific Ocean approximately 200 nautical miles (370 km) north west of Yap, Caroline Islands (11°12′N 135°14′E) by USS Flying Fish (United States Navy). Ninety-seven of her 824 passengers were killed.
Solvik	Sweden	World War II: The coastal tanker struck a mine and sank in the Baltic Sea off Swinemünde, Pomerania, Germany. She was later refloated.
Solviken	Germany	World War II: The cargo ship (3,502 GRT, 1940) was torpedoed and sunk in the Barents Sea east of Cape Nordkinn, Norway, by Soviet Air Force, or Soviet Naval Air Force Ilyushin Il-4 aircraft with the loss of two crew.
Taito Maru	Imperial Japanese Navy	World War II: The Haito Maru-class auxiliary transport was torpedoed and sunk in the Pacific Ocean 200 nautical miles (370 km) north west of Yap (11°12′N 135°14′E) by USS Flying Fish (United States Navy). Eighteen crewmen and passengers were killed.
U-990	Kriegsmarine	World War II: The Type VIIC submarine was depth charged and sunk in the North Sea west of Bodø, Norway (65°05′N 7°28′E) by a Consolidated B-24 Liberator aircraft of 59 Squadron, Royal Air Force with the loss of 20 of her 53 crew.
UIT-4	Germany	World War II: The submarine was sunk or destroyed in an Allied air raid on Monfalcone.
UIT-18	Germany	World War II: The submarine was sunk or destroyed in an Allied air raid on Monfalcone.
UJ 204	Kriegsmarine	World War II: The incomplete Ape-class submarine chaser, a former Gabbiano-class corvette, was sunk at CRDA Shipyard, Monfalcone by Allied aircraft.
UJ 2229	Kriegsmarine	World War II: The submarine chaser, a former Chamois-class minesweeper, was sunk off Genoa by HMS Universal (Royal Navy).

== 26 May ==
List of shipwrecks: 26 May 1944
Ship	State	Description
Chiyo Maru	Imperial Japanese Navy	World War II: The Tenyo Maru-class naval trawler/auxiliary storeship (658 GRT 1935) was torpedoed and sunk in the Pacific Ocean 170 nautical miles (310 km; 200 mi) west of Farallón de Pájaros, Mariana Islands (20°30′N 141°45′E) by USS Tambor (United States Navy). 13 crewmen were killed. Survivors were rescued by the auxiliary netlayer Koa Maru No. 2 Go (Imperial Japanese Navy) 170 kilometres (110 mi) west of Farallón de Pajaros.
Matsuyama Maru	Imperial Japanese Navy	World War II: The Katsuyama Maru-class transport ship was shelled and sunk by US Navy ships in Saipan Harbor.
Ro-108	Imperial Japanese Navy	World War II: The Ro-100-class submarine was hedgehogged and sunk in the Pacific Ocean north of the Admiralty Islands off Seeadler Harbor, Manus (00°32′S 149°56′E) by USS England (United States Navy).
San-Yo Maru	Imperial Japanese Navy	World War II: The Kenai Maru-class auxiliary transport ship was torpedoed and sunk in the Pacific Ocean north north west of Mendao, Celebes (02°46′N 124°22′E) by USS Cabrilla (United States Navy). 35 troops killed.
UJ 2229	Kriegsmarine	World War II: The submarine chaser was torpedoed and sunk by HMS Universal (Royal Navy).

== 27 May ==
List of shipwrecks: 27 May 1944
Ship	State	Description
Braunschweig	Germany	World War II: The fishing vessel struck a mine and sank in the Fehmarn Belt.
Ingeborg	Germany	World War II: The cargo ship was sunk in the Baltic Sea off Cape Kolka, Latvia either by a mine or by Soviet Douglas A-20 Havoc aircraft.
Palermo	Germany	World War II: The cargo ship struck a mine and sank in the Tagliamento Estuary, Italy.
USS PT-339	United States Navy	World War II: The ELCO 80'-class PT boat ran aground off the north shore of New Guinea and was scuttled (04°01′S 144°41′E).
U-292	Kriegsmarine	World War II: The Type VIIC/41 submarine was depth charged and sunk in the Norwegian Sea west of Trondheim, Norway (62°37′N 0°57′E) by a Consolidated B-24 Liberator aircraft of 59 Squadron, Royal Air Force with the loss of all 51 crew.

== 28 May ==
List of shipwrecks: 28 May 1944
Ship	State	Description
F 482	Kriegsmarine	World War II: The Type C2 Marinefährprahm was sunk in an Allied air raid on Genoa, Italy.
F 708	Kriegsmarine	World War II: The Marinefährprahm was sunk in an Allied air raid on Genoa.
F 4708	Kriegsmarine	The MZ-A landing craft was sunk on this date.
HMS MTB 732	Royal Navy	World War II: The Fairmile D motor torpedo boat (102/118 t, 1944) was shelled and sunk in the English Channel by La Combattante (Free French Naval Forces).
Snasei Maru	Japan	World War II: The troopship was torpedoed and sunk in the South China Sea off Tsushima Island by USS Sealion (United States Navy).
Tyokai Maru	Japan	World War II: The cargo ship was torpedoed and sunk in the Strait of Malacca by HMS Templar (Royal Navy).
UJ 2210	Kriegsmarine	World War II: The submarine chaser was torpedoed and sunk in the Tyrrhenian Sea off Deiva Marina, Italy by HMMTB 419, HMMTB 420, HMMTB 421 (all Royal Navy) and USS PT-218 (United States Navy). Eight crew were killed.
Vallelunga	Kriegsmarine	World War II: The auxiliary minelayer was sunk at Genoa by Allied aircraft.

== 29 May ==
List of shipwrecks: 29 May 1944
Ship	State	Description
Anshu Maru	Imperial Japanese Navy	World War II: The Shinkyo Maru-class auxiliary transport ship was torpedoed and damaged in the Celebes Sea 19 nautical miles (35 km) south south west of Manado, Dutch East Indies (03°40′N 126°58′E) by USS Rasher (United States Navy). She sank the next day without loss of life.
USS Block Island	United States Navy	World War II: The Bogue-class escort carrier was torpedoed and sunk in the Atlantic Ocean off the Canary Islands, Spain (31°13′N 23°03′W) by U-549 (Kriegsmarine) with the loss of six of her 957 crew.
Horaizan Maru	Japan	World War II: The cargo ship was torpedoed and sunk in the Pacific Ocean off the Marianas Islands by USS Silversides (United States Navy). An unidentified Imperial Japanese Navy midget submarine under tow was dragged down and sunk.
R-123	Kriegsmarine	World War II: The Type R-41 minesweeper was sunk off Le Havre by Allied aircraft.
Shoken Maru	Japan	World War II: The cargo ship was torpedoed and sunk in the Pacific Ocean off the Marianas Islands by USS Silversides (United States Navy). An unidentified Imperial Japanese Navy midget submarine under tow was dragged down and sunk.
Smelyj	Soviet Union	World War II: The tug (71 GRT) was torpedoed and sunk in the Black Sea (42°51′N 41°03′E) by U-23 (Kriegsmarine) with the loss of eleven crew. There were six survivors.
U-549	Kriegsmarine	World War II: The Type IXC/40 submarine was depth charged and sunk in the Atlantic Ocean (31°13′N 23°03′W) by USS Ahrens and USS Eugene E. Elmore (both United States Navy) with the loss of all 57 crew.

== 30 May ==
List of shipwrecks: 30 May 1944
Ship	State	Description
HMS Firmament	Royal Navy	The naval whaler (248 GRT, 1930) ran aground at Alexandria, Egypt and sank.
Inverlane	United Kingdom	World War II: The Admiralty requisitioned Inver-class tanker (9,141 GRT, 1938) was scuttled on Middle Skerry Reef in Burra Sound, Scapa Flow, Orkney Islands as a blockship.
Nordeflinge	United Kingdom	World War II: Convoy UGS 42: The cargo ship (2,873 GRT, 1942) was torpedoed and sunk in the Mediterranean Sea (37°02′N 3°47′E) by Junkers Ju 88 aircraft of II Staffeln, Kampfgeschwader 76 and I & III Staffeln, Kampfgeschwader 77, Luftwaffe. Twelve crewmen were killed. Nordeflinge was on a voyage from the United States to Gibraltar.
No. 317	Soviet Navy	The KM-4-class river minesweeping launch was sunk on this date.
Shiga Maru	Japan	World War II: The coaster was torpedoed and sunk in the Pacific Ocean off Mutoro Zaki, Japan by USS Pompon (United States Navy).
Shisen Maru	Japan	World War II: The cargo ship was torpedoed and sunk in the South China Sea south east of Formosa by USS Guitarro (United States Navy).
Shinyo Maru	Imperial Japanese Navy	World War II: The patrol boat was bombed and sunk in the Pacific Ocean 120 nautical miles (220 km) north east of the Kuril Islands by North American B-25 Mitchell aircraft of the United States Eleventh Air Force.
Showa Maru No. 3	Imperial Japanese Navy	World War II: The submarine chaser was bombed and damaged in the Pacific Ocean 120 nautical miles (220 km) north east of the Kuril Islands by North American B-25 Mitchell aircraft of the United States Fourteenth Air Force. She was declared a constructive total loss.
Vinotra III	Germany	World War II: The barge was sunk in the Mediterranean Sea by HMS Ultor (Royal Navy).

== 31 May ==
List of shipwrecks: 31 May 1944
Ship	State	Description
Henry Burgh	United States	The Liberty ship ran aground in the Farallon Islands and was wrecked. One hundred and ninety-two people were rescued by USS Lawrence (United States Navy).
Hokuyo Maru	Japan	World War II: Convoy HE: The cargo ship was torpedoed and sunk in the Pacific Ocean 70 miles (110 km) west of Matsuwa-To, Kuril Islands (about 48°00′N 151°00′E) by USS Herring (United States Navy). 38 crewmen were killed.
Ishigaki	Imperial Japanese Navy	World War II: Convoy HE:The Shimushu-class escort ship was torpedoed and sunk in the Pacific Ocean 70 miles (110 km) west of Matsuwa-To, Kuril Islands (48°30′N 151°30′E) by USS Herring (United States Navy) with the loss of 167 crew.
Kotaka	Imperial Japanese Navy	World War II: The Kotaka-class gunboat was bombed and sunk on the Yangtze River by Chinese aircraft.
Koto Maru	Imperial Japanese Navy	World War II: Convoy HE: The Koto Maru class auxiliary transport was torpedoed and sunk in the Pacific Ocean 70 miles (110 km) west of Matsuwa-To, Kuril Islands (47°55′N 151°42′E) by USS Barb (United States Navy). Thirty crewmen were killed.
M-13	Kriegsmarine	World War II: The minesweeper struck one of her own mines and sank in the Gironde estuary, France.
Madras Maru	Imperial Japanese Army	World War II: convoy HE: The Akita Maru-class auxiliary transport was torpedoed and sunk in the Pacific Ocean 70 miles (110 km) west of Matsuwa-To, Kuril Islands (48°21′N 151°20′E) by USS Barb (United States Navy). A total of 45 crew, 31 gunners and 63 passengers were killed. One hundred and sixty-one survivors boarded two Daihatsu landing barges that floated free from the sinking ship and sailed to land.
Palma	Yugoslav Partisans	World War II: Convoy: The transport was sunk by S 153, S 155, S 156, and S 158 (all Kriegsmarine).
PC-76 MC-22	Yugoslav Partisans	World War II: The small patrol boat was sunk in Oilib harbour by the German 392nd Infantry Division. Three crew were killed, her commanding officer killed himself.
Ro-105	Imperial Japanese Navy	World War II: The Ro-100-class submarine was hedgehogged and sunk in the Pacific Ocean north of the Admiralty Islands (00°47′N 149°56′E) by USS England (United States Navy) with all 55 hands.
Slaga	Yugoslav Partisans	World War II: Convoy: The transport was sunk by S 153, S 155, S 156, and S 158 (all Kriegsmarine). Between the boats sunk by the Germans, 159 Partisans, Italians and British advisors, 1 American pilot, 37 women and 5 children were taken prisoner.
Sokol	Yugoslav Partisans	World War II: Convoy: The transport was sunk by S 153, S 155, S 156, and S 158 (all Kriegsmarine).
U-289	Kriegsmarine	World War II: The Type VIIC submarine was depth charged and sunk in the Barents Sea south west of Bear Island, Norway (73°32′N 0°28′E) by HMS Milne (Royal Navy) with the loss of all 51 crew.
Unknown transports	Yugoslav Partisans	World War II: Convoy: The two transports were sunk by S 153, S 155, S 156, and S 158 (all Kriegsmarine).

== Unknown date ==
List of shipwrecks: Unknown date 1944
Ship	State	Description
Aghia Paraskevi	Greece	World War II: The Greek schooner was sunk either by Allied aircraft on 9 May, by Greek Partizans on 19 May at Stava, or on 20 May by unclear cause.
DC 20 Braunschweig	Kriegsmarine	The naval drifter was lost sometime in May.
F 590	Kriegsmarine	The Type C Marinefahrprahm was sunk sometime in May.
F 945	Kriegsmarine	The incomplete Type D Marinefahrprahm was sunk at Arsenal Toulon sometime in May.
F 4704	Kriegsmarine	The MZ-A landing craft was sunk sometime in May.
HMS LCA 130	Royal Navy	The landing craft assault (8.5/11.5 t, 1941) burned sometime in May at Marve.
HMS LCA 364, HMS LCA 382, HMS LCA 398, HMS LCA 417, HMS LCA 433, HMS LCA 459, HMS LCA 492, HMS LCA 526, HMS LCA 573, and HMS LCA 761	Royal Navy	The landing craft assaults (8.5/11.5 t, 1942-43) were lost sometime in May.
HMS LCE 5, HMS LCE 14, HMS LCE 21	Royal Navy	The landing craft (emergency repair)s were lost sometime in May.
HMS LCM 131, HMS LCM 182, HMS LCM 183, HMS LCM 207, HMS LCM 209	Royal Navy	The landing craft mechanizeds were lost in the East Indies sometime in May.
HMS LCM 212, HMS LCM 215, HMS LCM 218, HMS LCM 219, HMS LCM 243, HMS LCM 324, HMS LCM 527, HMS LCM 534, HMS LCM 540, HMS LCM 588, HMS LCM 1029, HMS LCM 1045, HMS LCM 1071, HMS LCM 1083, HMS LCM 1123, HMS LCM 1171, HMS LCM 1205	Royal Navy	The landing craft mechanizeds were lost overseas sometime in May.
HMS LCM 1380 and HMS LCM 1381	Royal Navy	The landing craft mechanizeds were lost in the Mediterranean Sea sometime in May.
HMS LCM 272, HMS LCM 277, HMS LCM 285, HMS LCM 288	Royal Navy	The landing craft mechanizeds were lost overseas sometime in May.
HMS LCP(L) 8, HMS LCP(L) 263, HMS LCP(L) 287, HMS LCP(L) 577	Royal Navy	The landing craft personnel (large)s were lost sometime in May.
HMS LCP(R) 584	Royal Navy	The landing craft personnel (ramp) sank in Home Waters sometime in May.
HMS LCP(R) 614, HMS LCP(R) 634, HMS LCP(R) 663, HMS LCP(R) 824, HMS LCP(R) 834, HMS LCP(R) 912, HMS LCP(R) 913, HMS LCP(R) 995	Royal Navy	The landing craft personnel (ramp)s were lost overseas sometime in May.
HMS LCP(R) 643	Royal Navy	The landing craft personnel (ramp)s were lost at Naples, Italy sometime in May.
HMS LCP(S) 25, HMS LCP(S) 50, HMS LCP(S) 61, HMS LCP(S) 73, HMS LCP(S) 74, HMS LCP(S) 101, HMS LCP(S) 135, HMS LCP(S) 137	Royal Navy	The landing craft personnel (support)s were lost sometime in May.
HMS LCP(S) 74	Royal Navy	The landing craft personnel (support) was lost overboard at Messina, Italy sometime in May.
HMS LCS(M) 59	Royal Navy	The landing craft support (mortar) was lost sometime in May.
USS Medusa	United States	The repair ship grounded on Buna Shoal off Buna, New Guinea, suffering hull damage. She was able to steam under her own power to Sydney, Australia, for repairs and soon returned to service.
Sansego	Italian Social Republic	World War II: The coaster was sunk by Allied aircraft at Mali Losinj. Raised by her Yugoslav owners, repaired and returned to service with previous name "Hrvatska" in 1946.
Stephen Crane	United States	World War II: The Liberty ship was bombed and damaged in the Pacific Ocean by Japanese aircraft and beached. Later refloated and eventually was declared a constructive total loss. Towed to the James River, Virginia, and laid up. Scrapped in Baltimore, Maryland in 1958.
U-240	Kriegsmarine	World War II: The Type VIIC submarine departed from Kristiansand, Norway on patrol on 13 May. No further trace, lost with all 50 crew between the 13 and 17 May.
UJ 2223	Kriegsmarine	World War II: The Gabbiano-class corvette was bombed and sunk at Genoa by United States aircraft on 16 August 1944, or sunk by the patrol torpedo boats USS PT-202, USS PT-213, and USS PT-218 (all United States Navy) on 24 May 1944.
UJ 310	Kriegsmarine	World War II: Crimean Offensive: The submarine chaser was sunk in the Black Sea by aircraft of the Soviet Fourth Air Army and Eighth Air Army between 5 and 12 May.
UJ 2310	Kriegsmarine	World War II: Crimean Offensive: The submarine chaser was beached at Sevastopol, Soviet Union between 5 and 12 May.
UJ 2313	Kriegsmarine	World War II: Crimean Offensive: The submarine chaser was sunk in the Black Sea by aircraft of the Soviet Fourth Air Army and Eighth Air Army between 5 and 12 May.
UJ 2314	Kriegsmarine	World War II: Crimean Offensive: The submarine chaser was sunk in the Black Sea by aircraft of the Soviet Fourth Air Army and Eighth Air Army between 5 and 12 May.
UJ 2315	Kriegsmarine	World War II: Crimean Offensive: The submarine chaser was beached at Sevastopol between 5 and 12 May.
