= USS Nields =

Benson-class destroyer

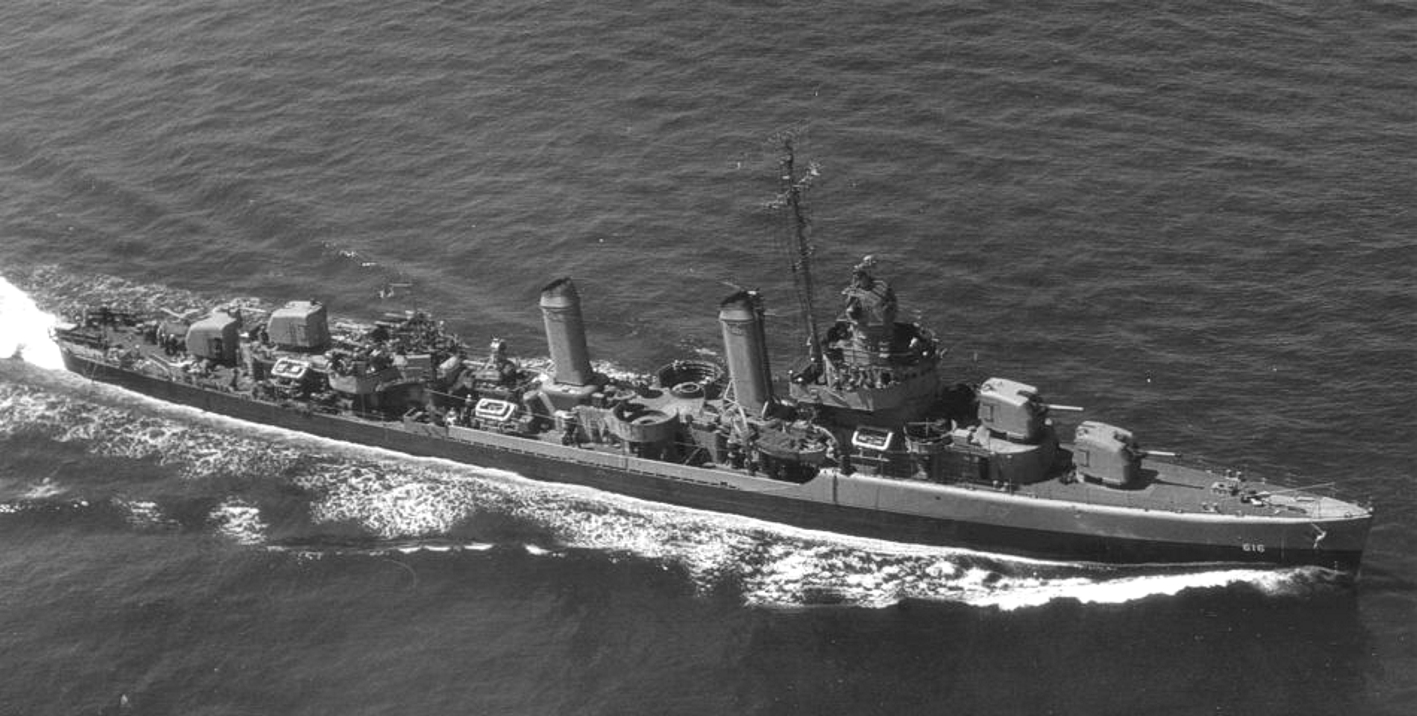
- USS Nields (DD-616)

History

United States
- Name: USS Nields (DD-616)
- Namesake: Henry C. Nields
- Builder: Fore River Shipyard
- Laid down: 15 June 1942
- Launched: 1 October 1942
- Commissioned: 15 January 1943
- Decommissioned: 26 March 1946
- Stricken: 15 September 1970
- Fate: Sold 8 May 1972 and broken up for scrap.

General characteristics
- Class & type: Benson-class destroyer
- Displacement: 1,620 tons
- Length: 348 ft 4 in (106.17 m)
- Beam: 36 ft 1 in (11.00 m)
- Draught: 17 ft 4 in (5.28 m)
- Speed: 37.5 knots (69.5 km/h)
- Complement: 259
- Armament: 4 x 5-inch 38 caliber, 4 x 40 mm., 7 x 20 mm., 5 x 21 inch (533 mm) torpedo tubes, 6 depth charge projectors, 2 depth charge tracks

USS Nields (DD-616) was a Benson-class destroyer in the United States Navy during World War II.

== Namesake ==
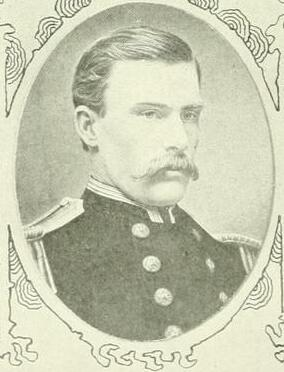
Portrait of namesake Henry C. Nields

Henry C. Nields was born on 18 March 1838 in West Chester, Pennsylvania. He was appointed Mate on 11 February 1863 and Acting Ensign on 11 July 1864. Assigned to USS Metacomet, he earned Admiral David G. Farragut's praise for his part in the rescue of survivors from USS Tecumseh after that monitor had gone down, mined within 600 yards (550 m) of Confederate guns during the Battle of Mobile Bay. Nields and his boat crew saved one officer, eight enlisted men, and Tecumseh's pilot, braving "one of the most galling fires" that Farragut had ever seen. Advanced to the rank of Lieutenant Commander on 1 July 1870, Nields died on 13 December 1880.

== Construction and commissioning ==
Nields was laid down on 15 June 1942 by the Bethlehem Steel Company, Fore River, Massachusetts; launched on 1 October 1942; sponsored by Miss Ella S. Nields, daughter of Lieutenant Commander Nields; and commissioned at the Boston Navy Yard on 15 January 1943.

== 1943 ==
Following shakedown and training off the east coast, Nields escorted two tankers to Aruba, Netherlands West Indies, and Cristobal, Panama Canal Zone, returning to Norfolk, Virginia, on 11 April 1943. Thence she proceeded to Boston, Massachusetts, before joining DesRon 16 at New York City. Assigned to transatlantic convoy duty, the destroyer departed New York on 28 April on her first North African run, screening convoy USG-8. Arriving at Oran, Algeria, on 19 May, Nields refueled and commenced patrolling the approaches to that anchorage. On patrol on 21 May, awaiting the departure of the convoy on its return voyage, Nields received a submarine contact report from a British observation plane and immediately headed for the area. At 1716, Nields established sound contact. At 1718 she dropped a pattern of 9 depth charges. At 1723, sound contact was regained and another 9-charge pattern was fired. At 1731 and at 1741, further charges were fired from her "K" guns, forward and port. Within seconds of the last attack, oil patches were observed. The Italian submarine Italian submarine Gorgo was one of three such submarines to be sunk by American forces.

The convoy, GUS–7A, sortied on 22 May, arriving New York on 8 June. By 26 June, Nields was back at Oran. Between that date and 5 July she conducted antisubmarine patrols off Algeria. On the 5th, she sortied with the "Cent" attack force, screening U.S. convoy NCF-1 and British convoy KMF-18. On the 10th, as Allied waves hit the beaches, the destroyer guarded Transport Area Two. There until the 13th, she guarded the transports from enemy aerial and underwater attack. On the 16th, she arrived back at Oran, whence she returned to New York, with convoy UGF-9, on 3 August. A period of refresher training out of Casco Bay, Maine, followed.

== 1944 ==
Mediterranean and UK convoys (UGF-10, GUF-12, UTF-3, KMF-25-A, TU-03, and TU-6), occupied Nields for the remainder of 1943, and into 1944. Highlighting that period was Commander, Task Force 60, Rear Admiral C. F. Bryant, commending Nields for her role in the rescue operations for survivors of Marnix and Santa Helena from convoy KMF-25-A, the victims of a German air attack.

In March 1944, Nields joined other units of DesDivs 31 and 32 in hunter-killer exercises out of Casco Bay, Maine. On 7 April, two destroyers of her hunter-killer group, Task Group 21.5, Champlin and Huse, sank U-856. Nields, displaying outstanding seamanship in heavy seas and decreasing visibility, picked up 11 survivors and transported them to New York where they were turned over to representatives of the Office of Naval Intelligence. From New York, Nields' division sailed for the Mediterranean 21 April to join the 8th Fleet.

Assigned to coastal escort and patrol duties on her arrival at Oran, on 2 May, Nields was soon drawn into a submarine chase lasting four days. On 14 May, U-616 was detected in the southwestern Mediterranean by British observation aircraft. Nields, temporarily with Destroyer Division 21, was one of the ships to answer the call. Soon afterward, Ellyson dropped the first depth charge pattern. On the morning of the 15th, oil slicks were spotted, but sound contact was lost. Another search plane sighted the submarine, now surfaced, ten miles away and running north toward southern France. The destroyers followed. At 1900 on the 16th, Nields, in a scouting line with Gleaves and Macomb, left the formation to investigate a negative sound contact. At 2157, all three destroyers made contact. Macomb illuminated the elusive quarry and opened fire. U-616 returned fire and started diving. At 2214, and again at 2231, Macomb attacked with depth charges. At 2335 and again at 2342, sound contacts were regained, but lost at 800 yards. U-616 was deep and maneuvering radically. At 2346, Nields set off an 11- charge pattern; and at 2350 began "creeping attacks". At 0043 on 17 May, Gleaves, with Nields directing, fired an 18-charge pattern, with deep settings, which surrounded the U-boat. Contact was lost at 0044. Soon after 0100, the three destroyers, having been joined by Ellyson, Hambleton, Rodman and Emmons, commenced a box patrol, with Nields taking position third from the right end of the scouting line. At 0449, Hambleton reported a sound contact, and, at 0515, commenced firing depth charges. At 0525, she made a second attack. Finally, at 0608, U–616 surfaced and was taken under fire by the surrounding destroyers. Nields, unable to fire without endangering others in the destroyer group, watched the hunted U-boat sink at 0612 and then screened the vessels detailed to pick up the 51 survivors.

Up to the amphibious assault on southern France, Nields was employed on North African-Italian escort missions in support of Allied ground forces pushing north from Salerno, conducting patrol and escort duty off Anzio and Civitaveccia, Italy. On 15 August, in Operation Dragoon she was off St. Raphael blocking E-boat entry into the transport area and providing preliminary bombardment and neutralization fire of "Red Beach." During that period, incident to her covering the passageways between the islands of St. Honorat and St. Marguerite, Nields came under heavy and rapid fire from German shore batteries. She returned fire and opened the range, emerging from the encounter unscathed. Through the 30th, she patrolled along the French coast, then turned back to North Africa whence she sailed for the U.S., in the screen of Battleship Division 5, on 4 September.

== 1945 ==
Arriving at Boston on 19 September to commence an availability, Nields conducted refresher training out of Casco Bay and escorted Guam to Norfolk, Virginia, arriving there on 27 October. Nields completed two more North African convoy assignments, with UGS-59 and UGF-19, before she rejoined the 8th Fleet on 16 January 1945. She then resumed Mediterranean escort duties until 9 April when she reported to Senior Officer, Allied Destroyers, Flank Force, for patrol duty in the Ligurian Sea. Operating with that force for 10 days, she supported a motor torpedo boat attack at Vada on the 11th and assisted in a bombardment of the Bordighera area on the 17th. Relieved by Kendrick on the 19th, Nields proceeded to Oran, thence to the United States, arriving at New York on 1 May.

Undergoing availability (extended to 3 July in order to effect repairs to her high pressure steam turbines) as hostilities ended in Europe, Nields next trained at Guantanamo Bay for duty in the Pacific. On 20 July, she got underway for Pearl Harbor, arriving on 9 August, less than a week before V-J Day. Assigned to occupation duty, Nields departed Hawaii on 21 August, shaping a course for Eniwetok, in the Marshalls, and Saipan, in the Marianas; she picked up Lunga Point at the latter place and escorted her to Okinawa, where Nields joined Destroyer Squadron 12 at Buckner Bay.

== Transfer to Pacific and fate ==
After a round trip to Guam, escorting convoy OKG-7 to the Marianas, Nields took an active part in the occupation of the Ryukyus, as part of Task Force 53, along with tank landing ships (LSTs) engaged with units of the U.S. 10th Army in the uneventful disarming of Japanese positions on islands in Tokara Gunto and Amami Gunto. On 6 October, in the vicinity of Tokono Shima, Nields sent visit and search parties to Hibiki, Amami, and Kunasiri, finding them to be engaged in transporting former Japanese POWs back to their homeland. Three days later, while Nields and LST-553 lay anchored off Koniya Hakuchi, in the narrow strait between Amami-O-Shima and Kakeroma Shima, wind velocity reached 110 knots; Nields, piloting by radar, managed to stay in the middle of the stream but her consort went aground. In attempting to pass a line to LST-553, Nields lost her anchor. Two days later, with a Japanese midget submarine in tow, the destroyer returned to Okinawa for tender availability.

Detached from the 5th Fleet, Nields sailed for the United States on 31 October 1945 in company with DesRon 12, and arrived at San Diego on 21 November. Continuing on, she steamed to Charleston, South Carolina, reporting to the 16th [Inactive] Fleet on 8 December. She was decommissioned there on 25 March 1946.

Shifted later to the Inactive Ship Facility, Orange, Texas, Nields was ultimately deemed "unfit for further Naval service" and stricken from the Naval Vessel Register on 15 September 1970. Sold to the Southern Scrap Material Company, Limited, of New Orleans, Louisiana, on 8 May 1972, she began her final voyage astern of the tug Betty Smith on the afternoon of 25 May 1972. She was broken up for scrap subsequently.

== Awards ==
Nields earned three battle stars during World War II.

As of 2009, no other ship in the United States Navy has been named Nields.
