= German submarine U-548 =

German World War II submarine

History

Nazi Germany
- Name: U-548
- Ordered: 5 June 1941
- Builder: Deutsche Werft, Hamburg
- Yard number: 369
- Laid down: 4 September 1942
- Launched: 14 April 1943
- Commissioned: 30 June 1943
- Fate: Sunk on 19 April 1945

General characteristics
- Class & type: Type IXC/40 submarine
- Displacement: 1,144 t (1,126 long tons) surfaced; 1,257 t (1,237 long tons) submerged
- Length: 76.76 m (251 ft 10 in) o/a; 58.75 m (192 ft 9 in) pressure hull
- Beam: 6.86 m (22 ft 6 in) o/a; 4.44 m (14 ft 7 in) pressure hull
- Height: 9.60 m (31 ft 6 in)
- Draught: 4.67 m (15 ft 4 in)
- Installed power: 4,400 PS (3,200 kW; 4,300 bhp) (diesels); 1,000 PS (740 kW; 990 shp) (electric)
- Propulsion: 2 shafts; 2 × diesel engines; 2 × electric motors
- Speed: 18.3 knots (33.9 km/h; 21.1 mph) surfaced; 7.3 knots (13.5 km/h; 8.4 mph) submerged
- Range: 13,850 nmi (25,650 km; 15,940 mi) at 10 knots (19 km/h; 12 mph) surfaced; 63 nmi (117 km; 72 mi) at 4 knots (7.4 km/h; 4.6 mph) submerged
- Test depth: 230 m (750 ft)
- Complement: 4 officers, 44 enlisted
- Armament: 6 × torpedo tubes (4 bow, 2 stern); 22 × 53.3 cm (21 in) torpedoes; 1 × 10.5 cm (4.1 in) SK C/32 deck gun (180 rounds); 1 × 3.7 cm (1.5 in) SK C/30 AA gun; 1 × twin 2 cm FlaK 30 AA guns

Service record
- Part of: 4th U-boat Flotilla; 30 June 1943 – 31 March 1944; 2nd U-boat Flotilla; 1 April – 30 September 1944; 33rd U-boat Flotilla; 1 October 1944 – 19 April 1945
- Identification codes: M 52 470
- Commanders: Kptlt. Eberhard Zimmermann; 30 June 1943 – 8 February 1945; Kptlt. Günther Pfeffer; August – November 1944; Oblt.z.S. Erich Krempl; 9 February – 19 April 1945
- Operations: 4 patrol: 1st patrol: 21 March – 24 June 1944; 2nd patrol: a. 11 August – 25 September 1944; b. 27 – 28 September 1944; 3rd patrol: a. 7 – 12 October 1944; b. 24 – 28 February 1945; 4th patrol: 5 March – 19 April 1945
- Victories: 1 warship sunk (1,445 tons)

German submarine U-548 was a Type IXC U-boat (Unterseeboot) of Nazi Germany's Kriegsmarine during World War II.

She was laid down at the Deutsche Werft (yard) in Hamburg as yard number 369 on 4 September 1942, launched on 14 April 1943, and commissioned on 30 June with Kapitänleutnant Eberhard Zimmermann in command.

U-548 began her service career with training as part of the 4th U-boat Flotilla from 30 June 1943. She was reassigned to the 2nd Flotilla for operations on 1 April 1944, then the 33rd Flotilla on 1 October.

She carried out four patrols and sank one ship.

She was sunk on 19 April 1945 by depth charges from American warships southeast of Halifax, Nova Scotia.

== Design ==
German Type IXC/40 submarines were slightly larger than the original Type IXCs. U-548 had a displacement of 1,144 tonnes (1,126 long tons) when at the surface and 1,257 tonnes (1,237 long tons) while submerged. The U-boat had a total length of 76.76 m (251 ft 10 in), a pressure hull length of 58.75 m (192 ft 9 in), a beam of 6.86 m (22 ft 6 in), a height of 9.60 m (31 ft 6 in), and a draft of 4.67 m (15 ft 4 in). The submarine was powered by two MAN M 9 V 40/46 supercharged, four-stroke, nine-cylinder diesel engines producing a total of 4,400 metric horsepower (3,240 kW; 4,340 shp) for use while surfaced and two Siemens-Schuckert 2 GU 345/34 double-acting electric motors producing a total of 1,000 shaft horsepower (1,010 PS; 750 kW) for use while submerged. She had two shafts and two 1.92 m (6 ft) propellers. The boat was capable of operating at depths down to 230 m (750 ft).

The submarine had a maximum surface speed of 18.3 knots (33.9 km/h; 21.1 mph) and a maximum submerged speed of 7.3 kn (13.5 km/h; 8.4 mph). When submerged, the boat could operate for 63 nautical miles (117 km; 72 mi) at 4 kn (7.4 km/h; 4.6 mph); when surfaced, she could travel 13,850 nmi (25,650 km; 15,940 mi) at 10 kn (19 km/h; 12 mph). U-548 was fitted with six 53.3 cm (21 in) torpedo tubes (four fitted at the bow and two at the stern), 22 torpedoes, one 10.5 cm (4.13 in) SK C/32 naval gun, 180 rounds, and a 3.7 cm (1.5 in) SK C/30, as well as a 2 cm (0.79 in) C/30 antiaircraft gun. The boat had a complement of 48.

== Service history ==
=== First patrol ===
U-548's first patrol began with her departure from Kiel on 21 March 1944. She passed through the gap separating Iceland and the Faroe Islands before heading out into the Atlantic Ocean. The boat was involved in a rather bizarre incident on the night of 3 May when a B-24 Liberator illuminated HMS Hargood east of Conception Bay, Newfoundland, thinking she was a U-boat. U-548 fired at the aircraft, which in turn wrongly assumed it had been engaged by the ship. The real quarry aborted her attack and escaped.

The boat was the target of an unsuccessful hunt by Allied escorts after the sinking of HMCS Valleyfield on 7 May, 50 nautical miles (93 km; 58 mi) south of Cape Race, Newfoundland.

She entered Lorient, on the French Atlantic coast, on 24 June 1944.

=== Second and third patrols ===
On her second foray, U-548 lost a man overboard, (Mechanikergefreiter (A) Walter Heise), during a crash-dive on 30 August 1944. Reversing the course of her first patrol, she arrived at Bergen in Norway, on 25 September.

Having moved to Hölen (southeast of Stavanger) in Norway, the boat began her third sortie on 7 October 1944. She docked at Flensburg on the 12th.

=== Fourth patrol and loss ===
By now, U-548 was based at Horten Naval Base (south of Oslo) also in Norway, from where she began her fourth and last patrol on 5 March 1945. She crossed the Atlantic once more and was sunk southeast of Halifax, Nova Scotia, on 19 April by depth charges from the American destroyer escorts Reuben James and Buckley.

Fifty-eight men died with the U-boat, with no survivors.

== Summary of raiding history ==
Date	Ship name	Nationality	Tonnage (Note: Merchant ship tonnages are in gross register tons. Military vessels are listed by tons displacement.)	Fate
7 May 1944	HMCS Valleyfield	Royal Canadian Navy	1,445	Sunk
