= USS Reuben James (DE-153) =

Buckley-class destroyer escort

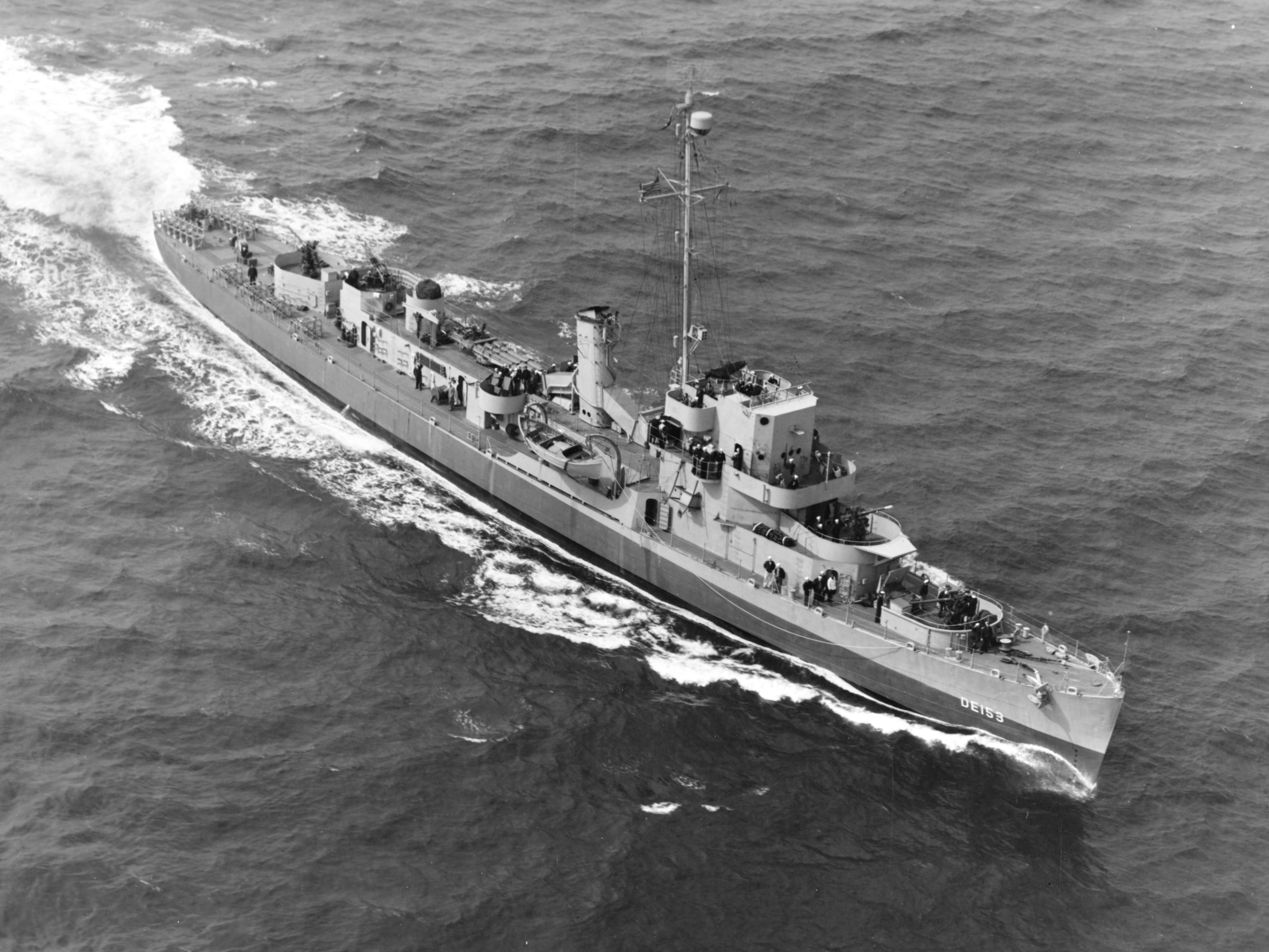

History

United States
- Name: USS Reuben James
- Namesake: Reuben James
- Builder: Norfolk Navy Yard, Portsmouth, Virginia
- Laid down: 7 September 1942
- Launched: 6 February 1943
- Commissioned: 1 April 1943
- Decommissioned: 11 October 1947
- Stricken: 30 June 1968
- Fate: Used as explosives test ship, 1968–1971; Sunk as target, 1 March 1971

General characteristics
- Class & type: Buckley-class destroyer escort
- Displacement: 1,740 long tons (1,768 t)
- Length: 306 ft (93 m)
- Beam: 37 ft (11 m)
- Draft: 13 ft 6 in (4.11 m)
- Propulsion: 2 × boilers; General Electric turbo-electric drive; 12,000 shp (8.9 MW); 2 × solid manganese-bronze 3,600 lb (1,600 kg) 3-bladed propellers, 8 ft 6 in (2.59 m) diameter, 7 ft 7 in (2.31 m) pitch; 2 × rudders
- Speed: 23.6 knots (43.7 km/h; 27.2 mph)
- Complement: 213 officers and enlisted
- Armament: 3 × single 3"/50 caliber guns; 1 × twin 40 mm gun; 8 × single 20 mm guns; 1 × triple 21 inch (533 mm) torpedo tubes; 1 × Hedgehog anti-submarine mortar; 8 × K-gun depth charge projectors; 2 × depth charge tracks

USS Reuben James (DE-153) was a Buckley-class destroyer escort in the United States Navy. She was the second ship named for Reuben James, a Boatswain's Mate who distinguished himself fighting the Barbary pirates.

Reuben James was laid down on 7 September 1942 at the Norfolk Navy Yard, Portsmouth, Virginia, launched on 6 February 1943, sponsored by Mrs. Oliver Hiram Ward, and commissioned on 1 April 1943.

== Service history ==
First based in Miami, Florida, she conducted anti-submarine patrols and provided training in convoy escort and anti-submarine warfare. In March 1944, she shifted homeport from Miami to Norfolk, Virginia. In June 1944, she escorted a convoy from New York to Norfolk. Between 13 July and 7 November 1944, Reuben James successfully escorted two convoys to the Mediterranean, returning with westbound convoys. During the ship's first eastbound voyage, nine German bomber aircraft attacked its convoy off Algeria on 1 August 1944. Reuben James shot down one enemy bomber. Returning to Boston on 7 November 1944, she joined an anti-submarine group operation in the North Atlantic. Operating south of Newfoundland, Reuben James was present when USS Buckley sank the German submarine U-548 on 19 April 1945.

Arriving at Houston, Texas, on 4 July 1945, Reuben James completed conversion to a radar picket ship on 25 November 1945, and was subsequently employed in the Atlantic and the Caribbean while being stationed in Norfolk, Virginia. She was decommissioned on 11 October 1947.

In 1949, she was designated DER, but was reclassified DE in 1954. She remained in the Atlantic Reserve Fleet until struck from the Navy List on 30 June 1968. Her hulk was sunk as a target on 1 March 1971.
