= German submarine U-616 =

German World War II submarine

History

Nazi Germany
- Name: U-616
- Ordered: 15 August 1940
- Builder: Blohm & Voss, Hamburg
- Yard number: 592
- Laid down: 20 May 1941
- Launched: 8 February 1942
- Commissioned: 2 April 1942
- Fate: Sunk on 17 May 1944

General characteristics
- Class & type: Type VIIC submarine
- Displacement: 769 tonnes (757 long tons) surfaced; 871 t (857 long tons) submerged
- Length: 67.10 m (220 ft 2 in) o/a; 50.50 m (165 ft 8 in) pressure hull
- Beam: 6.20 m (20 ft 4 in) o/a; 4.70 m (15 ft 5 in) pressure hull
- Draught: 4.74 m (15 ft 7 in)
- Installed power: 2,800–3,200 PS (2,100–2,400 kW; 2,800–3,200 bhp) (diesels); 750 PS (550 kW; 740 shp) (electric)
- Propulsion: 2 shafts; 2 × diesel engines; 2 × electric motors
- Speed: 17.7 knots (32.8 km/h; 20.4 mph) surfaced; 7.6 knots (14.1 km/h; 8.7 mph) submerged
- Range: 8,500 nmi (15,700 km; 9,800 mi) at 10 knots (19 km/h; 12 mph) surfaced; 80 nmi (150 km; 92 mi) at 4 knots (7.4 km/h; 4.6 mph) submerged
- Test depth: 230 m (750 ft); Crush depth: 250–295 m (820–968 ft)
- Complement: 4 officers, 40–56 enlisted
- Armament: 5 × 53.3 cm (21 in) torpedo tubes (four bow, one stern); 14 × torpedoes or 26 TMA mines; 1 × 8.8 cm (3.46 in) deck gun (220 rounds); 1 x 2 cm (0.79 in) C/30 AA gun

Service record
- Part of: 8th U-boat Flotilla; 2 April – 31 December 1942; 6th U-boat Flotilla; 1 January – 31 May 1943; 29th U-boat Flotilla; 1 June 1943 – 17 May 1944
- Identification codes: M 45 101
- Commanders: Oblt.z.S. Johann Spindlegger; 2 April – 7 October 1942; Oblt.z.S. Siegfried Koitschka; 8 October 1942 – 17 May 1944
- Operations: 9 patrols: 1st patrol: 6 February – 26 March 1943; 2nd patrol: 19 April – 17 May 1943; 3rd patrol: 28 July – 18 August 1943; 4th patrol: 8 – 18 September 1943; 5th patrol: 3 – 15 October 1943; 6th patrol: 20 November – 12 December 1943; 7th patrol: 3 – 15 January 1944; 8th patrol: 19 February – 15 March 1944; 9th patrol: 30 April – 17 May 1944
- Victories: 2 warships sunk (2,181 tons); 2 merchant ships damaged (17,754 GRT)

German submarine U-616 was a Type VIIC U-boat built for Nazi Germany's Kriegsmarine, for service during World War II. She was laid down on 20 May 1941 by Blohm & Voss, Hamburg as yard number 592, launched on 8 February 1942 and commissioned on 2 April 1942 under Oberleutnant zur See (Oblt.z.S.) Johann Spindlegger.

On 8 October 1942, Spindlegger was replaced by Oblt.z.S. Siegfried Koitschka, who commanded her until she was sunk on 17 May 1944.

== Design ==
German Type VIIC submarines were preceded by the shorter Type VIIB submarines. U-616 had a displacement of 769 tonnes (757 long tons) when at the surface and 871 tonnes (857 long tons) while submerged. She had a total length of 67.10 m (220 ft 2 in), a pressure hull length of 50.50 m (165 ft 8 in), a beam of 6.20 m (20 ft 4 in), a height of 9.60 m (31 ft 6 in), and a draught of 4.74 m (15 ft 7 in). The submarine was powered by two Germaniawerft F46 four-stroke, six-cylinder supercharged diesel engines producing a total of 2,800 to 3,200 metric horsepower (2,060 to 2,350 kW; 2,760 to 3,160 shp) for use while surfaced, two Brown, Boveri & Cie GG UB 720/8 double-acting electric motors producing a total of 750 metric horsepower (550 kW; 740 shp) for use while submerged. She had two shafts and two 1.23 m (4 ft) propellers. The boat was capable of operating at depths of up to 230 metres (750 ft).

The submarine had a maximum surface speed of 17.7 knots (32.8 km/h; 20.4 mph) and a maximum submerged speed of 7.6 knots (14.1 km/h; 8.7 mph). When submerged, the boat could operate for 80 nautical miles (150 km; 92 mi) at 4 knots (7.4 km/h; 4.6 mph); when surfaced, she could travel 8,500 nautical miles (15,700 km; 9,800 mi) at 10 knots (19 km/h; 12 mph). U-616 was fitted with five 53.3 cm (21 in) torpedo tubes (four fitted at the bow and one at the stern), fourteen torpedoes, one 8.8 cm (3.46 in) SK C/35 naval gun, 220 rounds, and a 2 cm (0.79 in) C/30 anti-aircraft gun. The boat had a complement of between forty-four and sixty.

== Service history ==
The boat's career began with training at 8th U-boat Flotilla on 2 April 1942, followed by active service on 1 January 1943 as part of the 6th Flotilla. On 1 June 1943 she transferred to operations in the Mediterranean as part of 29th Flotilla until her sinking in 1944.

In 9 patrols she sank 2 warships and damaged 2 merchant ships, for a total of 2,181 tons and 17,754 gross register tons (GRT), respectively.

=== Wolfpacks ===
U-616 took part in three wolfpacks, namely:

- Burggraf (24 February – 5 March 1943)
- Westmark (6 – 11 March 1943)
- Stürmer (11 – 20 March 1943)

=== Fate ===
U-616 was sunk on 17 May 1944 in the Mediterranean in position 36°46′N 00°52′E, by depth charges from USS Nields, USS Gleaves, USS Ellyson, USS Macomb, USS Hambleton, USS Rodman, USS Emmons and a RAF Wellington bomber of 36 Squadron

== Summary of raiding history ==
Date	Ship Name	Nationality	Tonnage (Note: Merchant ship tonnages are in gross register tons. Military vessels are listed by tons displacement.)	Fate
9 October 1943	USS Buck	United States Navy	1,570	Sunk
11 October 1943	HMS LCT-553	Royal Navy	611	Sunk
14 May 1944	Fort Fidler	United Kingdom	7,127	Damaged
14 May 1944	G S Walden	United Kingdom	10,627	Damaged

== See also ==
- Mediterranean U-boat Campaign (World War II)

== Bibliography ==
- Alden, John D. (2004). "Question 32/03: Loss of U-616 and U-960". Warship International. XLI (4): 333–335. ISSN 0043-0374.
- Busch, Rainer; Röll, Hans-Joachim (1999). German U-boat Commanders of World War II: A Biographical Dictionary. Translated by Brooks, Geoffrey. London, Annapolis, Maryland: Greenhill Books, Naval Institute Press. ISBN 1-55750-186-6.
- Busch, Rainer; Röll, Hans-Joachim (1999). Der U-Boot-Krieg, 1939-1945: Deutsche U-Boot-Verluste von September 1939 bis Mai 1945 [German U-boat losses from September 1939 to May 1945] (in German). Vol. IV. Hamburg, Berlin, Bonn: Mittler. ISBN 3-8132-0514-2.
- Gröner, Eric; Jung, Dieter; Maass, Martin (1991). German Warships 1815-1945: U-boats and Mine Warfare Vessels. Vol. 2. Translated by Thomas, Keith; Magowan, Rachel. London: Conway Maritime Press. ISBN 0-85177-593-4.
- Sharpe, Peter (1998). U-Boat Fact File. Great Britain: Midland Publishing. ISBN 1-85780-072-9.
