= USS Buckley =

Buckley-class destroyer escort

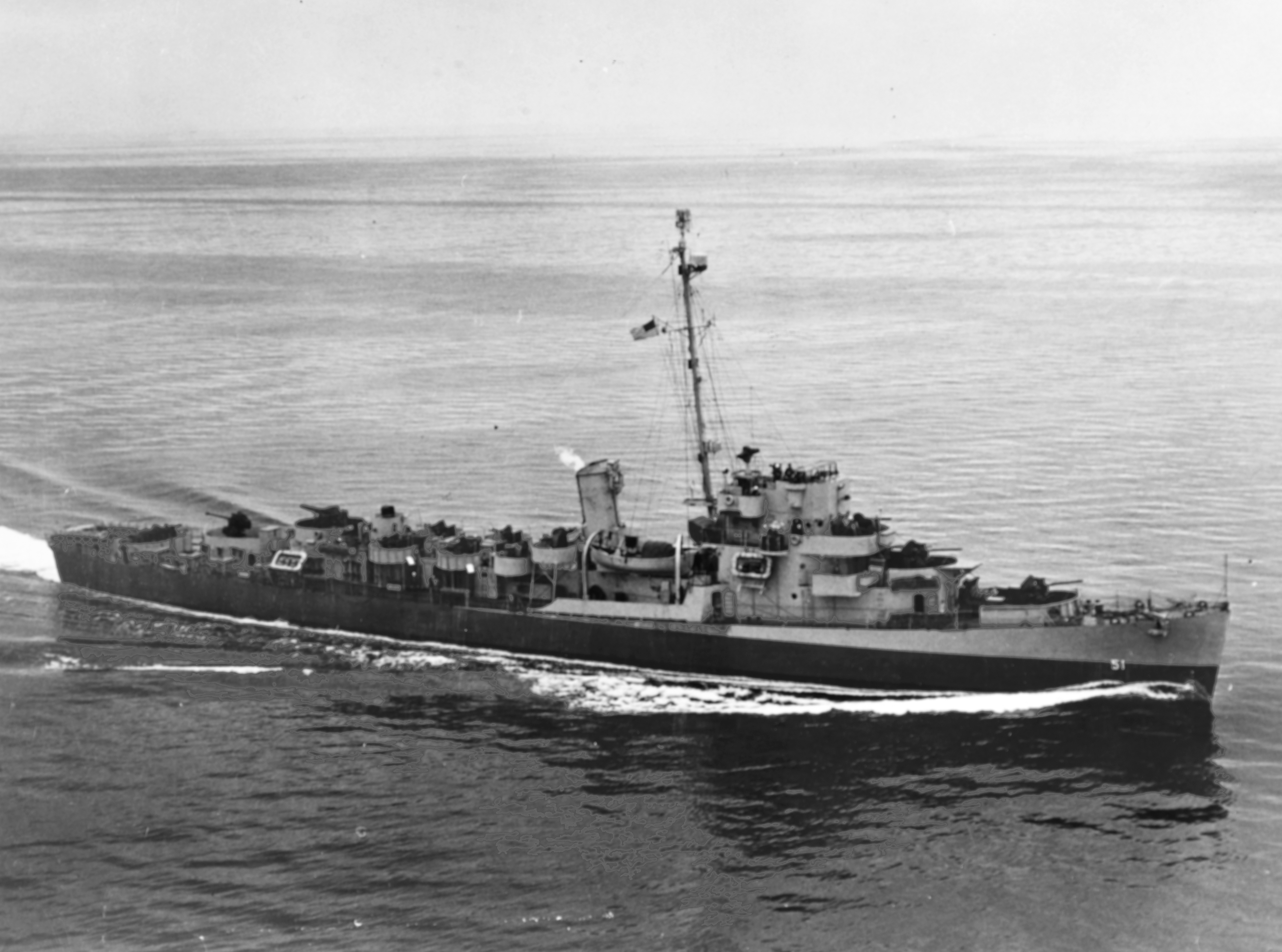
- USS Buckley in June 1944

History

United States
- Name: Buckley
- Namesake: John Daniel Buckley
- Builder: Bethlehem Hingham Shipyard
- Laid down: 29 June 1942
- Launched: 9 January 1943
- Commissioned: 30 April 1943
- Decommissioned: 3 July 1946
- Reclassified: DER-51, 26 April 1949; DE-51, 29 September 1954
- Stricken: 1 June 1968
- Identification: Hull symbol:DE-51; Code letters:NPGJ
- Honors and awards: Navy Unit Commendation & 3 battle stars (World War II)
- Fate: Sold for scrap, July 1969

General characteristics
- Class & type: Buckley-class destroyer escort
- Displacement: 1,400 long tons (1,422 t) light; 1,673 long tons (1,700 t) standard
- Length: 306 ft (93 m)
- Beam: 37 ft (11 m)
- Draft: 13 ft 6 in (4.11 m)
- Propulsion: Turbo-electric drive, 12,000 shp (8.9 MW); 2 shafts
- Speed: 24 knots (44 km/h; 28 mph)
- Complement: 186
- Armament: 3 × 3"/50 caliber guns; 1 × quad 1.1"/75 caliber gun; 8 × single 20 mm guns; 1 × triple 21-inch (533 mm) torpedo tube; 1 × Hedgehog anti-submarine mortar; 8 × K-gun depth charge projectors; 2 × depth charge tracks

USS Buckley (DE-51) was the lead ship of her class of destroyer escorts in the service with the United States Navy from 1943 to 1946. After spending 23 years in reserve, she was scrapped in 1969.

== History ==
USS Buckley was named in honor of Aviation Ordnanceman John D. Buckley (1920–1941), who was killed in action during the Japanese attack on the Hawaiian Islands on 7 December 1941.

Buckley was launched on 9 January 1943, by Bethlehem-Hingham Shipyard, Inc., Hingham, Massachusetts, sponsored by Mrs. James Buckley, mother of Aviation Ordnanceman Buckley; and commissioned on 30 April 1943.

=== Battle of the Atlantic ===
Between July 1943 and 22 April 1944, Buckley operated along the Eastern Seaboard as a training ship for prospective officers and nucleus crews of other destroyer escorts.

On 22 April 1944, she joined hunter-killer Task Group 21.11 (TG 21.11) for a sweep of the North Atlantic and Mediterranean convoy routes. The ship was west of Africa near the Cape Verde Islands in May. In the early morning of 6 May, aircraft from the escort carrier Block Island (CVE-21) reported an enemy submarine about 20 miles from Buckley. The ship steamed toward the U-boat at full speed. Meanwhile, U-66 had exhausted supplies and surfaced to recharge batteries and waited for a supply ship. At 03:08, believing the approaching ship was German, U-66 launched three flares. The distance between the two vessels was 4,000 yards when the U-boat realized the actual identity of the ship approaching her.

U-66 fired a torpedo, which Buckley dodged. The boat fired machine guns at the destroyer escort, which returned fire with 3-inch guns hitting the submarine's forecastle. Buckley then unleashed all her weapons on her target, repeatedly striking the conning tower as the submarine backed away and fired another torpedo, which the Buckley avoided. At 03:28, Buckley rammed the German submarine U-66 and the two vessels were briefly locked together. Some members of the German crew exited their burning boat, and hand-to-hand combat ensued using small arms and whatever weapons were at hand (such as coffee mugs and shell casings). The Buckley backed off, but the Unterseeboot pursued, striking the Buckley on the starboard side at the engine room. The collision also broke the ship's starboard propeller shaft. U-66 disengaged and slowly backed away, but not before hand grenades were thrown into the gaping hole in the flaming conning tower. The submarine sank at 03:41 at 17°17′N 32°24′W.

Buckley picked up 36 German survivors, transferred them to the Block Island, and then retired to New York City, where she underwent repairs until 14 June 1944. For this most interesting action, regarded by several high naval officers as being the most "exciting" antisubmarine kill in the Battle of the Atlantic, Buckley personnel were authorized to wear a combat star in the European-African Theater ribbon. The then-commanding officer, Lt. Comdr. Brent M. Abel, USNR, of Cambridge, Massachusetts, was awarded the Navy Cross for his part in its execution.

After completing refresher training at Casco Bay, Maine, in July 1944, Buckley escorted two convoys to North Africa (14 July – 7 November 1944). She then operated on antisubmarine warfare and convoy escort duty along the Eastern Seaboard and in the North Atlantic until June 1945. During this period, Buckley and Reuben James (DE-153) sank U-548 on 19 April 1945 at 42°19′N 61°45′W. Buckley escorted one more convoy to Algeria during June–July 1945, before returning to the U.S.

=== Conversion and fate ===
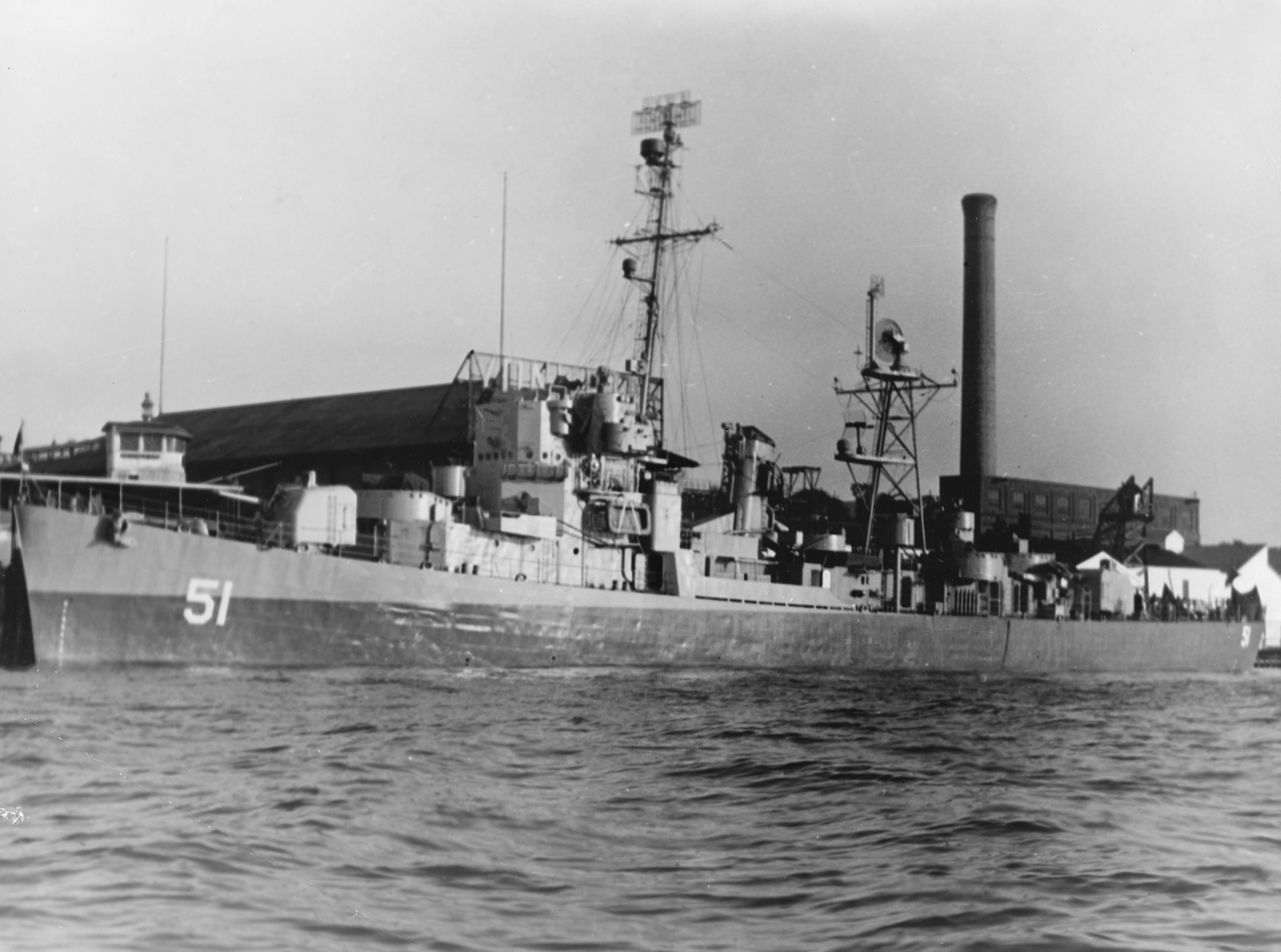
Buckley after her conversion, in late 1945

Upon her return to the East Coast, she commenced conversion to a radar picket ship. In October 1945, she participated in the Navy Day ceremonies at Jacksonville, Florida, and then on 31 October, reported to the 16th Fleet at St. Johns River, Florida. Buckley was placed out of commission in reserve on 3 July 1946. On 26 April 1949, her classification was changed to DER-51 (radar picket destroyer escort), and on 29 September 1954, she was reclassified back to DE-51.

Buckley was stricken from the Naval Vessel Register on 1 June 1968; she was sold for scrap on July 1969.

== In popular culture ==
Some scenes in the 1957 movie The Enemy Below (starring Robert Mitchum and Curt Jurgens) seem to be inspired by Buckley's battle with U-66, particularly near the end of the movie where the U.S. Navy destroyer escort grounds on the deck of the submarine. The ship used in the film was the USS Whitehurst (DE-634).

== Awards ==
- Navy Unit Commendation (for sinking U-66)
- American Campaign Medal with one battle star
- European-African-Middle Eastern Campaign Medal with two battle stars
- World War II Victory Medal
