= HMS Universal =

Submarine of the Royal Navy

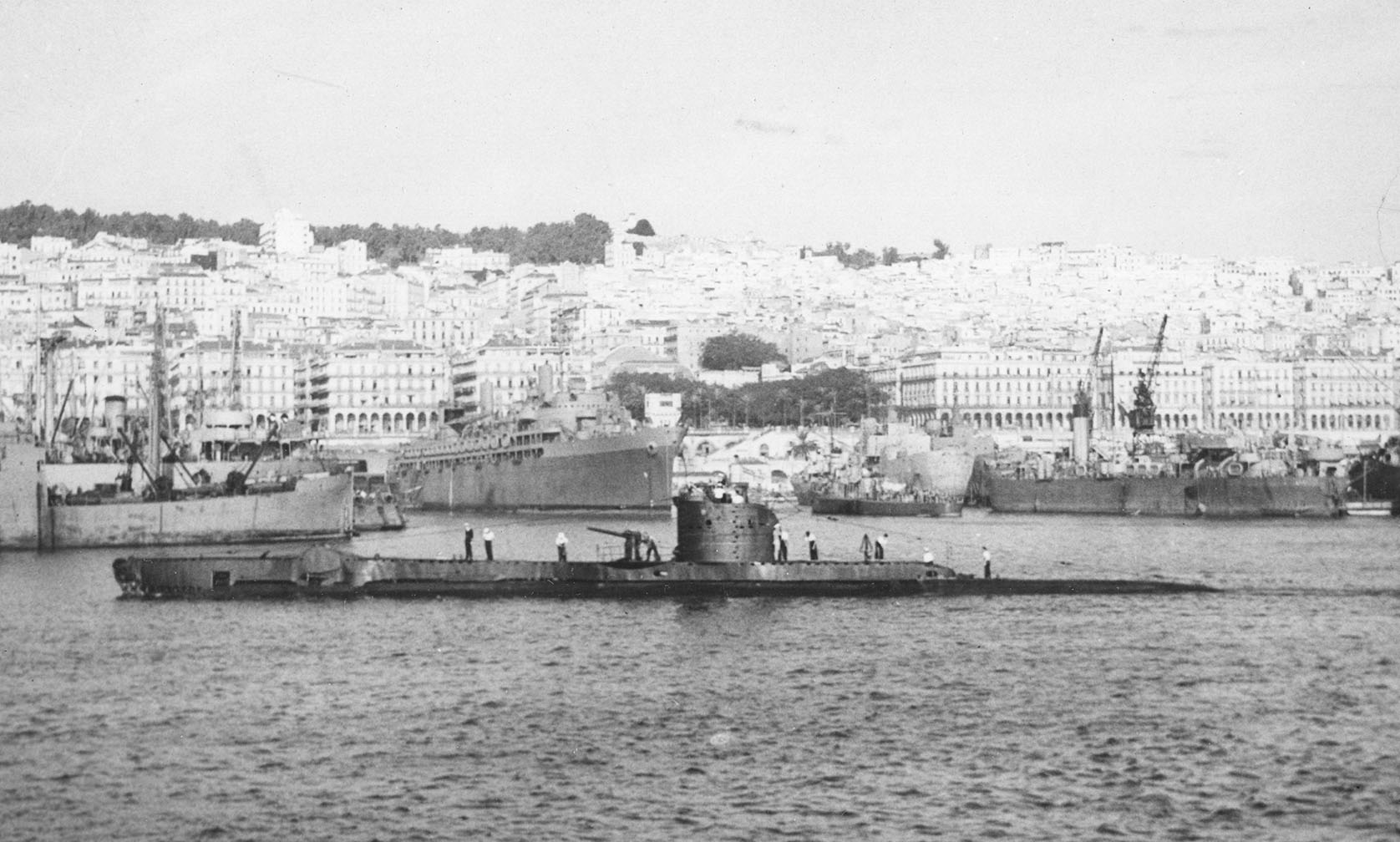
- HMS Universal, 16 October 1943

History

United Kingdom
- Name: HMS Universal
- Builder: Vickers-Armstrongs, Newcastle upon Tyne
- Laid down: 5 September 1941
- Launched: 10 November 1942
- Commissioned: 8 March 1943
- Fate: Sold for scrap, June 1946
- Badge

General characteristics
- Class & type: U-class submarine
- Displacement: Surfaced - 540 tons standard, 630 tons full load; Submerged – 730 tons
- Length: 58.22 m (191 ft)
- Beam: 4.90 m (16 ft 1 in)
- Draught: 4.62 m (15 ft 2 in)
- Propulsion: 2 shaft diesel-electric; 2 Paxman Ricardo diesel generators + electric motors; 615 / 825 hp
- Speed: 11.25 knots (20.8 km/h) max surfaced; 10 knots (19 km/h) max submerged
- Complement: 27-31
- Armament: 4 bow internal 21 inch (533 mm) torpedo tubes – 8 – 10 torpedoes; 1 – 3-inch (76 mm) gun

HMS Universal (P57) was a Royal Navy U-class submarine built by Vickers-Armstrongs at Newcastle upon Tyne. So far she has been the only ship of the Royal Navy to bear the name Universal.

== Construction ==
Universal was laid down at Vickers-Armstrongs, Newcastle upon Tyne in September 1941, launched in November 1942 and commissioned in March 1943.

== Career ==
She spent most of the war in the Mediterranean, where she sank the Italian auxiliary patrol vessels V 130/Ugo and V 134/Tre Sorelle, the Italian merchant La Foce, the German auxiliary gunboat SG 15 (the former French Rageot de la Touche), the German merchants President Dal Piaz and Canosa (the former French Corsa), the German Guardboat FMa 06 (the former French Guarani) and the German auxiliary minesweeper Petrel. Universal also damaged the Spanish sailing vessel Sevellina and the Italian tanker (in German control) Cesteriano, which was later towed to Toulon. Universal also fired a torpedo against what is identified as an enemy auxiliary minesweeper. They claimed to have damaged the so far unidentified ship.

== Fate ==
Universal survived the war and was sold to be broken up for scrap in February 1946. On 3 February, on passage from Foyle, Northern Ireland, to Newport, Monmouthshire, under the command of Lieut-Commander W.F.N. Main R.N.R. her engines failed and the following morning she was taken in tow by the destroyer HMS Southdown. With the weather deteriorating the tow broke eight or nine times and was eventually abandoned. Lifeboats from Aberystwyth, New Quay and Fishguard attended over 24 hours, standing by in heavy seas until Universal's crew had to abandon ship.

She was scrapped at Milford Haven in June 1946.

== Bibliography ==
- Alexiades, Platon & Robinson, Richard (2001). "Question 38/00: Sinking of UJ-2229". Warship International. XXXVIII (4): 331. ISSN 0043-0374.
- Colledge, J. J.; Warlow, Ben (2006) [1969]. Ships of the Royal Navy: The Complete Record of All Fighting Ships of the Royal Navy from the 15th Century to the Present (3rd Rev ed.). London: Chatham Publishing. ISBN 978-1-86176-281-8. OCLC 67375475.
- Hutchinson, Robert (2001). Jane's Submarines: War Beneath the Waves from 1776 to the Present Day. London: HarperCollins. ISBN 978-0-00-710558-8. OCLC 53783010.
