= USS Ellyson =

Gleaves-class destroyer

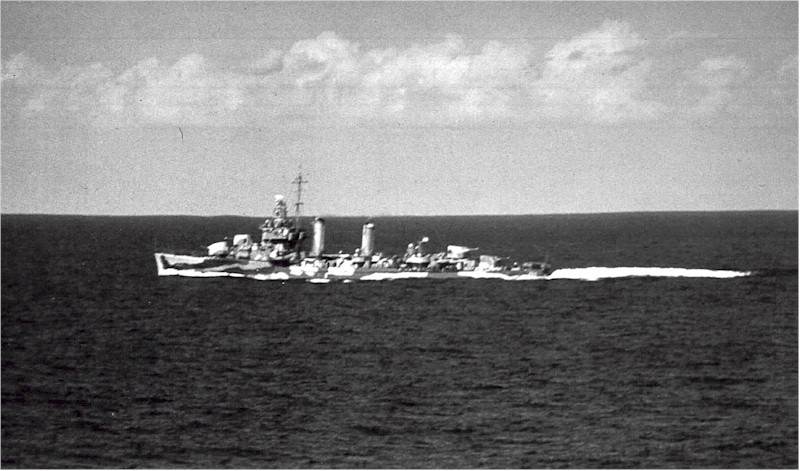
- USS Ellyson (DD-454)

History

United States
- Name: USS Ellyson
- Namesake: Theodore Gordon Ellyson
- Builder: Federal Shipbuilding and Drydock Company
- Laid down: 20 December 1940
- Launched: 26 July 1941
- Commissioned: 28 November 1941
- Identification: DD-454
- Decommissioned: 19 October 1954
- Reclassified: DMS-19, 15 November 1944
- Fate: To Japan, 19 October 1954
- Stricken: 1 February 1970

Japan
- Name: JDS Asakaze
- Acquired: 19 October 1954
- Identification: DD-181
- Fate: Returned to U.S., 1970; sold to Republic of China, August 1970 and cannibalized for spare parts

General characteristics
- Class & type: Gleaves-class destroyer
- Displacement: 1,630 tons
- Length: 348 ft 3 in (106.15 m)
- Beam: 36 ft 1 in (11.00 m)
- Draft: 11 ft 10 in (3.61 m)
- Propulsion: 50,000 shp (37,000 kW); 4 boilers; 2 propellers
- Speed: 37.4 knots (69 km/h)
- Range: 6,500 nmi (12,000 km; 7,500 mi) at 12 kn (22 km/h; 14 mph)
- Complement: 16 officers, 260 enlisted
- Armament: 4 × 5 in (127 mm) DP guns, 6 × 0.5 in (12.7 mm) guns, 6 × 20 mm AA guns, 10 × 21 in (533 mm) torpedo tubes, 2 × depth charge tracks

USS Ellyson (DD-454/DMS-19), a Gleaves-class destroyer, is the only ship of the United States Navy to be named for Theodore Gordon Ellyson, a submariner who became the first officer of the U.S. Navy to be designated a naval aviator.

== Service history ==
Ellyson was laid down by Federal Shipbuilding of Kearny, New Jersey on 20 December 1940. She was launched on 26 July 1941 sponsored by Miss Gordon Ellyson, daughter of Commander Ellyson, and commissioned on 28 November 1941.

=== 1942 ===
Still outfitting when the United States entered World War II, Ellyson was quickly readied for sea and patrolled in the Atlantic, protecting Allied shipping from Halifax, Nova Scotia, to the West Indies and Panama Canal. On 14 January 1942 she rescued 24 survivors from the sunken Norwegian SS Norness. On 15 June she broke the pennant of Commander, Destroyer Squadron 10, which she was to carry proudly through the war, through the squadron's redesignation to Mine Division 20 and the subsequent conversion of its destroyers to high-speed minesweepers.

In August 1942 Ellyson began operating with the aircraft carrier Ranger, and remained with her through the landings at Fedhala, French Morocco, on 8 November. After two months of escort duty along the east coast, she rejoined Ranger on two voyages to Casablanca to ferry Army planes to north Africa.

=== 1943 ===
On 5 April 1943 Ellyson arrived at NS Argentia, Dominion of Newfoundland, to prepare for operations with the Royal Navy. She sailed for England on 12 May in the screen of the battleships South Dakota and Alabama, and operated with the British Home Fleet out of Scapa Flow in the Orkney Islands screening convoys, giving distant support to Allied shipping to Murmansk and Iceland, and attempting to lure German battleship Tirpitz and other German surface ships from the safety of Norwegian bases to battle on the open seas. In July she took part in a feint invasion of southern Norway to distract German attention from the real assault on Sicily.

Returning to Norfolk, Virginia, on 9 August 1943, Ellyson screened Iowa during the battleship's shakedown cruise off Argentina, then returned to Norfolk with her on 24 October. On 3 November Ellyson sailed in the scouting line for Iowa who was carrying President Franklin D. Roosevelt to the Teheran Conference. Later, moving into the battleship's screen, Ellyson touched Bahia, Brazil; Freetown, Sierra Leone, Dakar, and Port Royal, South Carolina; before returning to Boston, Massachusetts, on 19 December.

=== 1944 ===
On 6 January 1944 Ellyson once again joined Ranger for screen and plane guard duty in Narragansett Bay. She sailed for north Africa 19 April and arrived at Oran on 1 May. On the 16th while hunting submarines Ellyson made contact on U-616, touching off an intensive coordinated air-sea hunt. The submarine surfaced at 23:58, and soon dived after a brief duel with Macomb. Ellyson and Hambleton continued the attack with depth charges, forcing U-616 to surface again. Ellyson sank her with gunfire on the morning of the 17th, then rescued 30 survivors.

Ellyson arrived at Plymouth, on 22 May 1944 for last-minute preparations for the invasion of France. On 6 June she covered the Army Ranger assault on Pointe du Hoc to knock out the heavy gun emplacements reported there. On 25 June she saw action off Cherbourg, blasting gun installations, destroying naval mines, and laying a smoke screen for larger fleet units.

Ellyson sailed from Portland Harbour on 29 June 1944, to invade southern France on 15 August. She led the destroyer fires support group in directly behind the minesweepers and knocked out defenses for the incoming troops. On patrol on 27 August she illuminated a suspicious fishing vessel and captured it, finding 50 German submariners trying to escape. Ellyson remained on patrol to cover the landing of reinforcements and support the invasion until October, then sailed for Boston, arriving 8 November to begin conversion to a high-speed minesweeper. She was reclassified to hull classification symbol DMS-19 on 15 November 1944.

=== 1945 ===
After training in Chesapeake Bay, Ellyson sailed from Norfolk, on 3 January 1945 for the Pacific. On 24 March she arrived off Okinawa with the rest of her squadron to sweep in advance of the invasion. After thus making possible the pre-assault bombardment, she supported smaller minesweepers clearing approaches to the beaches and inner harbors. After the landings of 1 April Ellyson joined the radar picket line. The varied and dangerous duties assigned her squadron in the Okinawa operation took a heavy toll, only three of the 12 ships with whom she sailed in the next three months survived undamaged. Ellyson went to the aid of her sister ship Emmons on 6 April, attempting to tow the abandoned kamikaze victim. Flames and the threat of a magazine explosion forced Ellyson to sink the stricken destroyer early on 7 April to prevent her drifting on to Japanese-held Ie Shima. Ellyson herself was attacked several times and accounted for a number of Japanese planes.

In July 1945 Ellyson became flagship for the task group sweeping the East China Sea. Upon the ceasefire, she joined Third Fleet off Tokyo Bay and cleared it for the incoming occupation fleet units. In September she returned to Okinawa, and from her base at Buckner Bay, served as command ship for clearing the Inland Sea. She sailed from Japan on 5 December for Norfolk, arriving 5 January 1946.

=== Post war ===
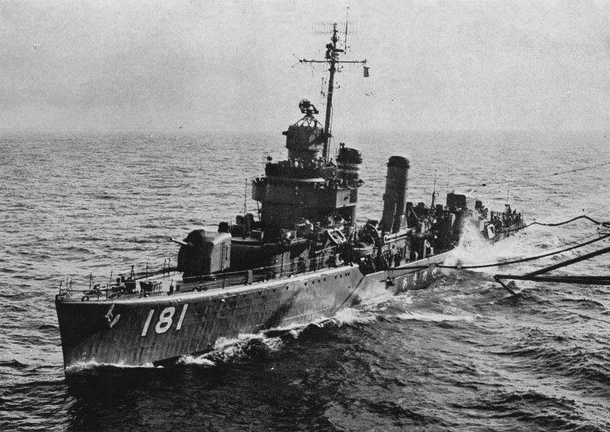
Asakaze in 1959.

Ellyson remained in the Atlantic, based at Charleston, South Carolina, primarily, for training as far as the Caribbean Sea. In 1948 she was immobilized at Charleston, resumed operations that November when she sailed to Argentia to sweep for an amphibious exercise. Attached to Mine Force, Atlantic Fleet, Ellyson continued to operate from Charleston on training duty along the east coast and in the Caribbean. She served in the Mediterranean with the Sixth Fleet in 1949, 1951, and 1953. On 4 May 1954 her hull classification symbol reverted to DD-454.

=== Japanese service ===
She was decommissioned 19 October 1954, and transferred to the Japanese Government on 20 October 1954 under the Mutual Defense Assistance Program. She served in the Japan Maritime Self-Defense Force as Asakaze.

In 1970 the ship was returned to the United States, and was sold to Taiwan, where she was cannibalized for spare parts.

== Awards ==
Ellyson received seven battle stars for World War II service.
