= USS Emmons =

Gleaves-class destroyer

Coordinates: 26°48′N 128°04′E

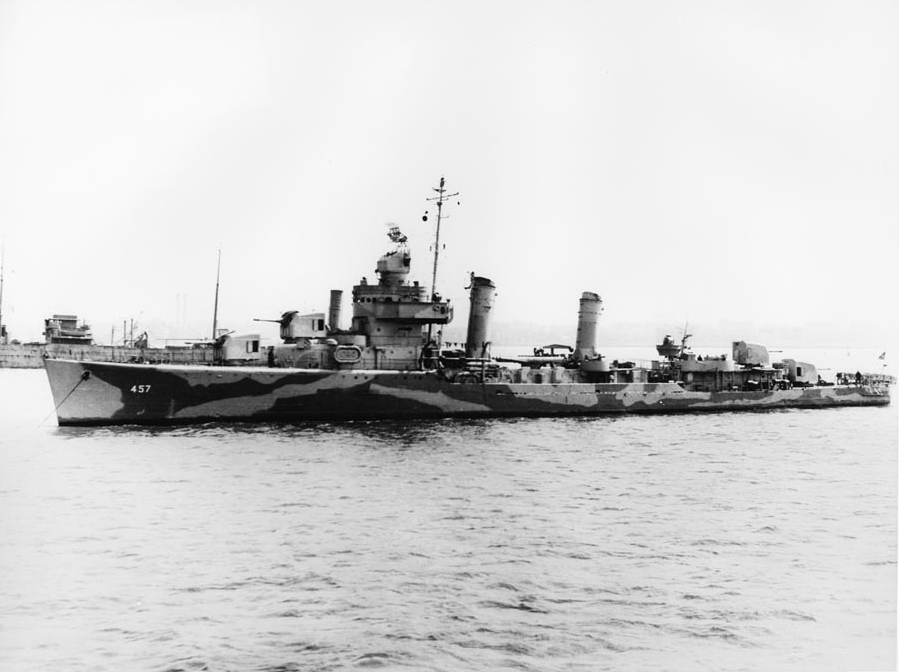
- USS Emmons (DD-457) at anchor c1942

History

United States
- Name: Emmons
- Namesake: George F. Emmons
- Builder: Bath Iron Works
- Laid down: 14 November 1940
- Launched: 23 August 1941
- Commissioned: 5 December 1941
- Identification: DD-457
- Reclassified: DMS-22, 15 November 1944
- Fate: Scuttled on 7 April 1945 after suffering five hits from Kamikaze aircraft on the afternoon of 6 April 1945.

General characteristics
- Class & type: Gleaves-class destroyer
- Displacement: 2,050 tons
- Length: 348 ft 4 in (106.17 m)
- Beam: 36 ft 1 in (11.00 m)
- Draft: 15 ft 8 in (4.78 m)
- Propulsion: 50,000 shp (37,000 kW); 4 boilers; 2 propellers
- Speed: 35 knots (65 km/h)
- Range: 6,500 nmi (12,000 km; 7,500 mi) at 12 kn (22 km/h; 14 mph)
- Complement: 208
- Armament: 4 × 5 in (127 mm) DP guns, 6 × 0.5 in (12.7 mm) guns, 6 × 20 mm AA guns, 10 × 21 in (533 mm) torpedo tubes, 6 × depth charge projectors, 2 × depth charge tracks

USS Emmons (DD-457/DMS-22) was a Gleaves-class destroyer of the United States Navy, named for Rear Admiral George F. Emmons (1811–1884).

Emmons was launched 23 August 1941 by Bath Iron Works Corp., Bath, Maine, sponsored by Mrs. F. E. Peacock, granddaughter of Rear Admiral Emmons. The ship was commissioned on 5 December 1941. She was reclassified DMS-22 on 15 November 1944.

== Service history ==
=== 1942-1943, Atlantic service ===
Emmons sailed from Norfolk 31 January 1942 on her shakedown to Callao, Peru, where she embarked Peruvian officers for Valparaíso, Chile, returning to Boston via several ports in Ecuador. She patrolled in New England waters, and in April escorted the aircraft carrier Ranger across the Atlantic to the Gold Coast, where the carrier launched Army fighter planes, brought for the base at Accra and other African air bases.

The summer of 1942 found Emmons patrolling out of NS Argentia, Newfoundland, and escorting troopships from Boston to Halifax. At Halifax on 5 July she joined an Army transport and a merchantman, whom she shepherded to a mid-ocean rendezvous with a British escort unit to take them safely into Iceland. Emmons sailed on to join the British Home Fleet in Scapa Flow on 16 July. She underwent training necessary to coordinate American and British procedures and tactics. Between 26 and 31 July, she escorted the battleship HMS Duke of York to Iceland and back to Scapa Flow, then had convoy escort duty on the Scottish coast. On 17 August she cleared Scapa Flow for Iceland where she made rendezvous with a convoy bound through the treacherous northern shipping lanes to Kola Inlet in the Soviet Union, from which she returned to Greenock, 30 August.

Emmons returned to New York on 9 September 1942 and trained in Casco and Chesapeake Bays, and at Bermuda, for the invasion of north Africa, for which she sailed from Bermuda 26 October. She screened carriers covering landings at Safi between 8 and 13 November, returning by way of Bermuda and Norfolk to Boston. After brief overhaul and coastwise escort duty, she went to Cristobal to await a convoy to New York. Meanwhile, she passed through the Panama Canal on 9 January 1943 to train briefly with officers of the Ecuadoran Navy. She guarded the passage of a convoy to north Africa in February returning to New York on 11 March for training. On 2 April Emmons put to sea via Argentia for Scapa Flow, where she joined the British Home Fleet again on 19 May.

During the next 2½ months, Emmons joined in patrolling northern waters, guarding the movement of convoys across the North Atlantic, unceasingly alerted against the possible sortie of German ships from Norwegian bases. She also guarded British carriers in air attacks on Norway in July. Returning to Norfolk 9 August 1943, she voyaged to Gibraltar between 3 November and 19 December in the advance scouting line guarding the battleship Iowa, carrying President Franklin D. Roosevelt to the Teheran Conference.

=== 1943-1944, Atlantic and Mediterranean ===
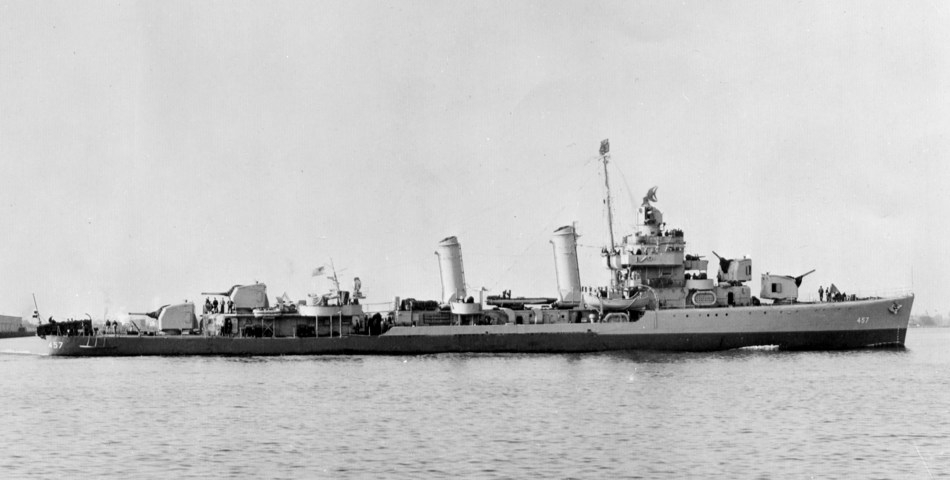
Emmons near Norfolk Naval Shipyard, November 1943

Between December 1943 and April 1944, Emmons guarded carriers during their operations at Newport and in Casco Bay, aiding in the training of aviators. On 20 April she sailed from Maine waters for the Azores, and Mers-el-Kebir, Algeria, arriving 1 May for antisubmarine patrols. On 17 May, her group teamed with British aircraft to sink the German submarine U-616, and the next day, Emmons sailed for England, and final preparations for the invasion of France, 6 June. After guarding pre-assault minesweeping, she joined in the heavy bombardment prior to the landing. Emmons and other destroyers engaged in combat, less than a thousand yards, with onshore batteries. She remained off the beachhead for three days as watchdog for the vast armada of ships lining up with men and supplies, then retired across the English Channel to Plymouth, England, screening the battleship Texas. Returning to the assault area 11 June, Emmons served in the screen guarding transports and supply ships from submarine attack. After replenishing at Portland, England, from 21 to 24 June, she kept watch around battleships and cruisers on 25 June in the Task Force 129 Bombardment of Cherbourg supporting the U.S. First Army VII Corps victory at the Battle of Cherbourg.

Emmons returned to Mers-el-Kebir 10 July 1944 with a transport convoy she had brought across from Portland, then had escort duty in the Mediterranean ports preparing for the assault on southern France. She sailed from Taranto, Italy, for the beachheads, 11 August, and on the 15th began pre-invasion bombardment. She remained off the beaches all day to provide fire support to troops storming ashore. Escort duty took her away to Italian and Corsican ports, but she returned to patrol off the French Riviera until October.

=== 1944-1945, Transfer to Pacific and loss ===
Emmons put into Boston on 9 November 1944 for conversion to a high-speed destroyer minesweeper, and was reclassified as DMS-22. After training in the Atlantic and exercises in the Hawaiian Islands, she entered Ulithi to stage for the invasion of Okinawa. Her squadron put to sea 19 March 1945 for the dangerous, vital task of clearing Okinawa's waters to let assault ships close the beaches for the landings on 1 April. She then took up picket duty, and on 6 April, during one of the first of the massive kamikaze attacks, was a target as she sailed with Rodman. One of the first planes to attack struck Rodman, and as Emmons circled the stricken ship to provide antiaircraft cover, both DMSs were overwhelmed by kamikazes. Many were shot down, but Emmons was struck by five, almost simultaneously. One hit her fantail, the rest to starboard of her pilot house, of No. 3 gun mount on her waterline, aft, and the port side of her combat information center. Crippled and ablaze, with ammunition exploding in bulk, Emmons found damage control a desperate, losing struggle. That day her crew, who had already won the Navy Unit Commendation for Okinawa, lost 60 dead, 77 wounded. The rest had to abandon ship. Next day, 7 April, the hulk was sunk to prevent its falling into enemy hands.

In addition to her Navy Unit Commendation, Emmons received five battle stars for World War II service. After minesweeping training, Emmons went by way of Ulithi to the waters around Okinawa in preparation for the planned invasion on 1 April 1945. Early in the morning of 24 March, Emmons and other destroyer minesweepers began sweeping assigned areas south and southwest of Okinawa. On 6 April, the day of Japan's first and largest of ten mass kamikaze attacks called Kikusui (Floating Chrysanthemum), Emmons and her sister ship Rodman were assigned northwest of Okinawa to provide gunfire support for AM class minesweeper units. At 1532, three kamikaze planes attacked Rodman, with one crashing into the forecastle starting huge fires and another one hitting close aboard to starboard with a bomb rupturing the hull and causing flooding in several compartments. Emmons started to circle Rodman to provide fire support to the seriously damaged ship with an estimated 50 to 75 enemy aircraft heading their way. Combat Air Patrol (CAP) destroyed many Japanese planes, and Emmons shot down six. Another four planes crashed close aboard without causing serious damage. Finally, a kamikaze succeeded in crashing into Emmons at 1732, and four more kamikaze aircraft hit the ship within two minutes killing 60 and wounding 77 [1]. At about the same time, another suicide aircraft hit the damaged Rodman, which suffered casualties of 16 dead and 20 wounded [2] from a total of three kamikaze aircraft hits. About 1800, the decision was made aboard Emmons to abandon ship, and the drifting ship with uncontrolled fires was sunk by gunfire from the high-speed minesweeper Ellyson (DMS-19) in the early morning of 7 April 1945.

Several officers and crewmen from Emmons received individual recognition for outstanding performance of duty on 6 April 1945, with awards of one Navy Cross, four Silver Stars, and eight Bronze Stars. All personnel serving on Emmons at the time of the sinking received a Navy Unit Commendation Ribbon from the Secretary of the Navy. The commendation reads as follows:

For outstanding heroism in action while attached to Mine Squadron TWENTY, operating under Commander Mine Force, Pacific Fleet, from 24 to 31 March; and thereafter under the operational control of Commander Transport Screen, from 1 to 6 April 1945, during operations for the seizure of enemy-held Okinawa, Ryukyu Islands. Although lightly armed and highly vulnerable while operating in dangerous mined waters, the Emmons rendered heroic service in minesweeping, fire support, radar picket, anti-suicide boat, antisubmarine and antiaircraft screen missions. A natural and frequent target for heavy Japanese aerial attack, she was constantly vigilant and ready for battle, firing her guns valiantly against a group of Japanese suicide planes striking in force on 6 April, and downing six of the attackers before five others crashed her in rapid succession, killing or wounding many personnel and inflicting damage which resulted in her sinking. By her own aggressiveness and the courage and skill of her officers and men, the U.S.S. Emmons achieved a record of gallantry in combat reflecting the highest credit upon herself and the United States Naval Service.

== Dive site and vandalism ==
The wreck of Emmons lies in 147 feet (45 m) of water off Okinawa's Kouri Island. It has become a popular dive site since its rediscovery in February, 2001.

The wreck made national headlines in September 2010 when it was revealed that it had been vandalized by divers. The ship's builders plate, or data plate, had been removed without the permission of the U.S. Navy, which still maintains custody of the wreck. To many veterans this act was akin to robbing a grave. As one said, "That ship is a resting place (for sixty men). Those men deserve our respect".

On 7 April 2011, the plaque was recovered by the Naval Criminal Investigative Service and is in the hands of proper authorities. The U.S. Navy will determine how the plaque will be displayed.

== Legacy ==
The old mess hall on Camp Shields on Okinawa, Japan was refurbished into a training building around 2018. It was renamed the USS Emmons Training Center after the ship.

== In popular culture ==
- The wreck of Emmons was featured as part of the Cities of the Underworld episode Tunnels of Hell. The episode focused on the caves used during the World War II Battle of Okinawa. Camera crew and show host also dived on the Emmons wrecksite located off the Okinawa coast.
