= Macomb =

Macomb is the name of several places in the United States of America:

== Places in the United States ==
- Macomb, Illinois, a city
  - Macomb Municipal Airport
  - Macomb station, an Amtrak intercity train station
- Macomb Township, McDonough County, Illinois
- Macomb County, Michigan
- Macomb Township, Michigan
- Macomb Correctional Facility, Lenox County, Michigan
- Macomb, Missouri, an unincorporated community
- Macomb, New York, a town
- Macomb, Oklahoma, a town
- Fort Macomb, Louisiana, a 19th century fort
- Macomb Mountain, New York

== Schools ==
- Macomb Community College, Warren, Michigan
- Macomb High School, Macomb, Illinois
- Macomb Academy of Arts and Sciences, Armada, Macomb County, Michigan, a school for gifted students
- International Academy of Macomb, Macomb County, Michigan, a public, magnet high school

== Other uses ==
- Macomb (surname), a list of people
- Macomb Mall, Roseville, Michigan, a shopping center
- Macomb Sports and Expo Center, Warren, Michigan
- Macomb Theatre, former name of Emerald Theatre, Mt. Clemens, Michigan
- Macomb Potters a former minor league baseball franchise based in Macomb, Illinois
- USS Macomb, a destroyer

== See also ==
- SS Alexander Macomb, a World War II Liberty ship
- Macomb Farm, Dover, Delaware, United States, on the National Register of Historic Places
- Macomb Reservation State Park, Schuyler Falls, New York
- Macombs Dam, Harlem River, New York City
- Macomb's Purchase, New York, a very large tract of land bought in 1791 by land speculator Alexander Macomb
- McComb (disambiguation)
- Macome, a surname
