= Macomb (surname) =

Macomb is a surname that may refer:

- Alexander Macomb (merchant) (1748–1831), Irish-American merchant and land speculator, father of Alexander Macomb
- Alexander Macomb (general) (1782–1841), commanding general of the U.S. Army (1828–1841)
- David B. Macomb (1827–1911), U.S. Navy rear admiral and engineering officer during the American Civil War, grandson of merchant William Macomb
- John Navarre Macomb Jr. (1811–1889), U.S. Army topographical engineer, explorer of the Colorado River, U.S. Army colonel and nephew of Major General Alexander Macomb
- Montgomery M. Macomb (1852–1924), U.S. Army brigadier general, son of John Navarre Macomb Jr.
- William Macomb (1751–1796), Irish-British fur trader, merchant and landowner in Detroit, member of first parliament of Upper Canada, brother of merchant Alexander Macomb
- William H. Macomb (1819–1872), American Civil War naval officer, son of Major General Alexander Macomb

== See also ==
- McComb (surname)
- Macome, a surname
- Macomber (disambiguation)
