= McComb (surname) =

McComb is a surname. According to a 2002 text, McComb is the most common derivative in Ireland of the Gaelic MacThom meaning "son of Thomas", or "son of Tom". Another, potentially interrelated origin, places McComb as a sept of Clan Mackinnon. A third potential origin is as a derivative of Malcolm.

Related surnames include McCombs, McComish, McCombe, McComas, McCombie and Macomber.

Following are a list of notable individuals sharing this surname:

Person	Country of origin	Occupation / notability	Born (Y)	Died (Y)
Archie McComb	United States	politician	1885	1968
Bert McComb	Australia	professional athlete	1906	1981
Billy McComb	Northern Ireland	magician and comedian	1922	2006
Colin McComb	United States	writer and game designer	1970	
David McComb	Australia	musician	1962	1999
Don McComb	United States	professional athlete	1934	2018
Eleazer McComb	United States	merchant	1740	1798
Frank McComb	United States	jazz singer	1970	
Gordon McComb	United States	basketball player	1917	2007
Heather McComb	United States	actress	1977	
Isaac N. McComb	United States	politician and physician	1850	1938
Jeremy McComb	United States	musician	1981	
John McComb Jr.	United States	architect	1763	1853
Kate McComb	United States	actress	1872	1959
Kathy and Carol McComb	United States	singers and musicians		
Leonard McComb	United Kingdom	artist	1930	2018
Liz McComb	United States	singer and musician	1952	
Marshall F. McComb	United States	judge	1894	1981
Robert McComb	Australia	musician	BEF 1962	
William McComb	United States	Confederate Brigadier General	1828	1918
