= ROCS Hsien Yang =

ROCS Hsien Yang (DD-16) may refer to one of the following Gleaves-class destroyers of the Republic of China Navy:

- ROCS Hsien Yang (DD-16) (ex-Rodman), the former USS Rodman (DD-456) launched in September 1941; acquired by the Republic of China Navy in 1955; ran aground, c. 1969; repairs were too expensive, so name and pennant number were transferred to the former USS Macomb (DD-458) after that ship's 1970 purchase; scuttled in 1976 for a film
- ROCS Hsien Yang (DD-16) (ex-Macomb), the former USS Macomb (DD-458) launched in September 1941; transferred to Japan in 1954 as JDS Hatakaze; returned to U.S. custody in 1969 and sold to Taiwan in 1970 for spare parts; after repairs for Hsien Yang (DD-16) (the former USS Rodman) were deemed too expensive, the name and pennant number were transferred to this ship; stricken in 1975
