= Academy of Arts and Sciences =

Academy of Arts and Sciences may refer to:

- Academy of Sciences and Arts of Bosnia and Herzegovina
- Academy of Sciences and Arts of the Republika Srpska
- Academy of Arts & Sciences (San Francisco), a public high school
- American Academy of Arts and Sciences
- Croatian Academy of Sciences and Arts
- Doclean Academy of Sciences and Arts
- European Academy of Sciences and Arts
- Galileiana Academy of Arts and Science
- Ghana Academy of Arts and Sciences
- Hawaii Academy of Arts and Sciences, US
- Macedonian Academy of Sciences and Arts
- Macomb Academy of Arts and Sciences
- Montenegrin Academy of Sciences and Arts
- Polish Academy of Arts and Sciences
- Puerto Rico Academy of Arts and Sciences
- Royal Academy of Sciences and Arts of Belgium
- Royal Netherlands Academy of Arts and Sciences
- Russian Academy of Sciences
- Saginaw Arts and Sciences Academy
- Serbian Academy of Sciences and Arts
- Slovenian Academy of Sciences and Arts
- Sumner Academy of Arts & Science, US
- Swiss Academy of Arts and Sciences
- The Bay Academy for the Arts and Sciences
- Vojvodina Academy of Sciences and Arts
- World Academy of Art and Science

== Others ==
- Academy of Interactive Arts & Sciences, US
- Academy of Motion Picture Arts and Sciences, US
- Academy of Television Arts & Sciences, US
- Canadian Academy of Recording Arts and Sciences
- Filipino Academy of Movie Arts and Sciences Award
- International Academy of Digital Arts and Sciences, US
- International Academy of Television Arts and Sciences, US
- Mexican Academy of Film Arts and Sciences
- National Academy of Recording Arts and Sciences, US
- National Academy of Television Arts and Sciences, US
