= USS Genesee (1862) =

Gunboat of the United States Navy

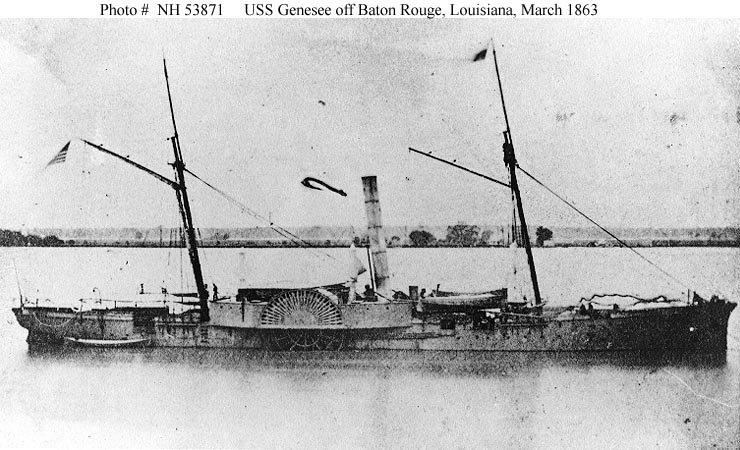

History

United States
- Launched: 2 April 1862
- Commissioned: 3 July 1862
- Decommissioned: 31 July 1865
- Renamed: Hattie C. Besse
- Home port: San Francisco, California
- Identification: U.S. Official Number 11851
- Fate: Sold 3 October 1867; Stranded 20 November 1871

General characteristics
- Displacement: 803 tons
- Length: 209 ft (64 m)
- Beam: 34 ft 11 in (10.64 m)
- Draft: 10 ft 6 in (3.20 m)
- Propulsion: Inclined, Direct Acting Steam Engine built by Neptune Iron Works side-wheel steamer - Double-ender
- Speed: 8.5 knots
- Complement: 113
- Armament: 1 10-inch Dahlgren, 1 100 pounder Parrot rifle, 4 24-pounder Howitzer, 4 11-inch Dahlgren

USS Genesee was a steamer acquired by the Union Navy during the American Civil War. She was used by the Navy to patrol navigable waterways of the Confederacy to prevent the South from trading with other countries.

== Service history ==
Genesee was launched 2 April 1862 by the Boston Navy Yard; sponsored by Miss Emily Dorr; and commissioned 3 July 1862, Comdr. William H. Macomb in command. Assigned to the North Atlantic Blockading Squadron, Genesee sailed from Boston, Massachusetts, 6 July 1862 for Hampton Roads, Virginia, where she convoyed U.S. mail steamers in the James River until departing 19 October for blockade duty off North Carolina. For over 3 months she helped seal Wilmington, North Carolina, and Beaufort from Confederate blockade runners. She got underway 19 February 1863 to join the West Gulf Blockading Squadron, arriving New Orleans, Louisiana, 7 March in time to join Rear Admiral David Farragut's expedition up the Mississippi River past Port Hudson, Louisiana, to cut off Confederate supplies from the Red River and to join Admiral David Dixon Porter and General U.S. Grant in operations against Vicksburg, Mississippi.

During the siege of Vicksburg to the north, Port Hudson was the Confederate stronghold to the south. In order to cut off supplies which were being shipped from the west, Farragut & Banks determined to run the fort at Port Hudson. For the dangerous passage, Farragut lashed gunboats to the sides of his large steamers to protect the heavy ships from enemy fire and to improve their maneuverability. Genesee was paired off with Richmond when the Union Fleet moved upstream on the night of 14 March and came within range of the Confederate guns. In the ensuing fight Farragut's losses were greater than those he had suffered in taking New Orleans. Richmond's steam line was severed, forcing her to drop down out of range. Genesee fought on; but a 6-inch shot pierced her hull and detonated a 10-inch shell which, in turn, wreaked havoc below; and the murderous fire shredded her rigging. Only Hartford and her consort Albatross made it past the Southern batteries.

Following needed repairs, Genesee continued to patrol the Mississippi River until after the fall of Vicksburg 4 July 1863. Then, she was ordered to the Gulf for blockade duty on 11 September. She discovered blockade-running steamer Fanny bound for Mobile, Alabama, 11 September, and with Jackson and Calhoun gave chase. As they closed, the blockade runner's captain burned his ship to the waterline rather than allow her capture. Genesee continued to operate off Mobile with Admiral Farragut and assisted in several captures as the Navy prepared for the assault on Mobile Bay. When the fleet steamed boldly into the bay on 5 August to engage the forts and Confederate squadron, Genesee remained outside until the passage was effected, then steamed up to open fire on Fort Morgan.

Genesee was used subsequently as a stores ship, and for the next several months was occupied supplying ships of the fleet and helping to drag Mobile Bay for dangerous torpedoes (mines), a duty in which several ships were lost. Genesee sailed 11 July 1865 for Philadelphia, Pennsylvania, arrived at the Philadelphia Navy Yard in Philadelphia, Pennsylvania on 20 July 1865, and decommissioned there on 31 July 1865. She was sold 3 October 1867 to Michael G. Kimber of Halifax, Nova Scotia, Canada. She was converted into a four-masted sailing ship operated commercially as Hattie C. Besse, U.S. official number 11851. She was the property of Messrs. Harris & Holman & Others in San Francisco, California, when she was stranded on the shoreline of the Washington Territory 20 nautical miles (37 km) south of Cape Flattery on 20 November 1871. Her crew were rescued. She was on a voyage from San Francisco to the Burrard Inlet.
