= Montgomery M. Macomb =

United States army brigadier general (1852–1924)

Montgomery Meigs Macomb
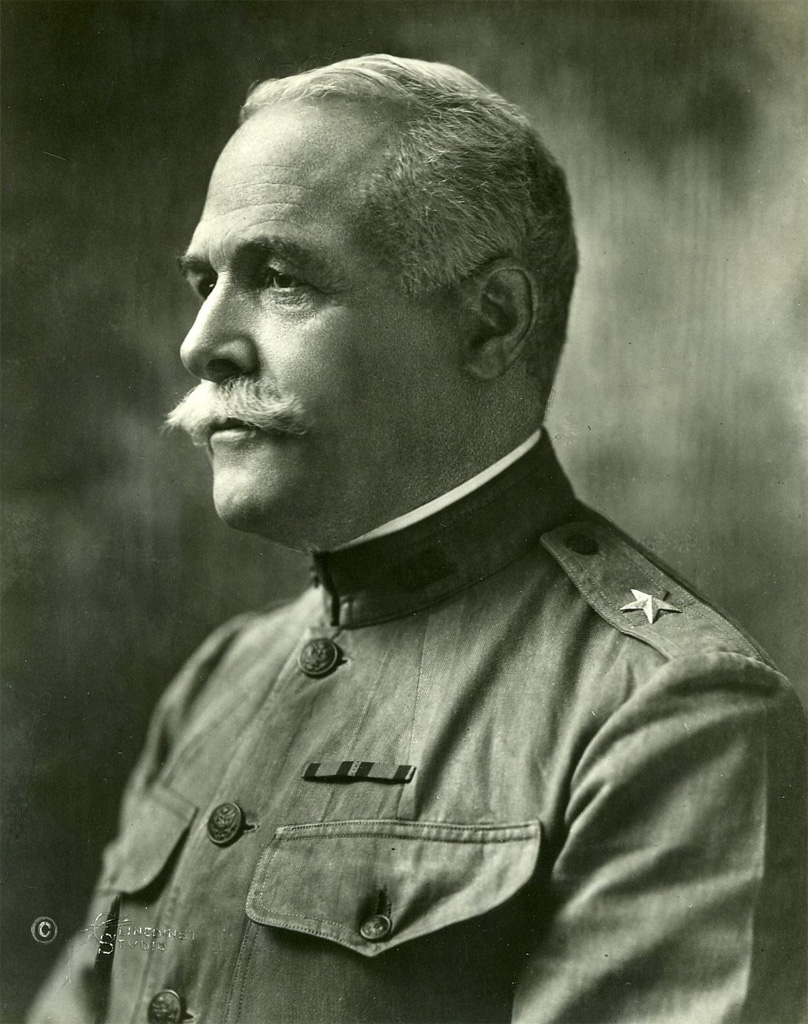
- Montgomery Meigs Macomb
- Born: October 12, 1852; Detroit, Michigan, US
- Died: January 19, 1924 (aged 71); Washington, D.C., US
- Burial place: Arlington National Cemetery
- Spouse: Caroline Luce Walter Macomb (1857–1933)
- Relatives: Montgomery C. Meigs (uncle); Stephen Bleecker Luce (father in law); Gen. Alexander Macomb (grand-uncle); Alexander Macomb (merchant) (great-grandfather); Philip Livingston (great-grandfather)
- Military career
- Allegiance: United States of America
- Branch: United States Army
- Service years: 1874–1916; 1917–1918
- Rank: Brigadier General
- Commands: Light Battery M, 7th Field Artillery Regiment; 6th Field Artillery Regiment; District of Hawaii; Department of Hawaii; 1st Hawaiian Brigade; United States Army War College; Fort Sill
- Conflicts: Spanish–American War; World War I

Montgomery Meigs Macomb (October 12, 1852 – January 19, 1924) was a United States Army brigadier general. He was a veteran of the Spanish–American War and World War I, and was notable for serving as commander of the Hawaiian Department, the Army War College, and Fort Sill.

== Early life ==
Montgomery M. Macomb was born in Detroit, Michigan on October 12, 1852. The son of Colonel John Navarre Macomb Jr and Ann Minerva Rodgers Macomb, the daughter of John Rodgers. Montgomery Macomb was connected by ancestry and marriage to several prominent families, including those of Philip Livingston, Alexander Macomb, and Montgomery C. Meigs.

Macomb attended Hughes Center High School in Cincinnati, and attended Yale University from 1869 to 1870. He then transferred to the United States Military Academy (West Point), from which he graduated in 1874. Ranked fourth in his class, his high standing facilitated his assignment to a coveted post with the Field Artillery. (At the time, top graduates were usually selected for the Engineers or Field Artillery.)

== Start of career ==
His initial assignments were a posting to the Presidio (1874), Fort Wrangel, Alaska (1874–1875), and duty as aide-de-camp to Montgomery C. Meigs in Europe (1875–1876).

Macomb took part in the Wheeler Survey of the western United States from 1876 to 1883, after which he carried out assignments at the Artillery School and with the 4th Field Artillery Regiment. From 1887 to 1891 he was an instructor at West Point, teaching both mathematics and drawing.

From 1891 to 1896 Macomb was assigned to special duty with the Intercontinental Railway Commission, using skills developed during the Wheeler Survey to carry out exploration, surveying and mapmaking of potential railroad routes in Central and South America. He served with the 4th Field Artillery at Fort Riley from 1896 to 1898.

== Spanish–American War ==
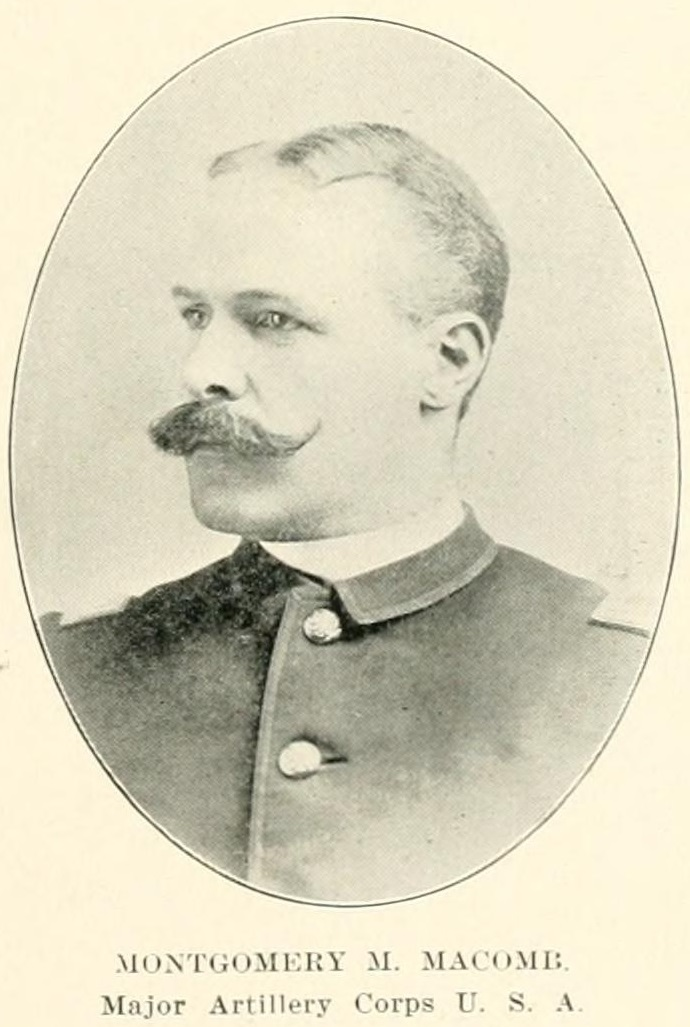
Macomb as a Major shortly after the Spanish–American War

During the Spanish–American War Macomb commanded Light Battery M, 7th Field Artillery Regiment in Puerto Rico (1898–1900) and the Philippines (1900–1902). Later in 1902 he was a member of the board which surveyed and reported on the defense of harbors in the Philippines.

== Post-Spanish–American War ==
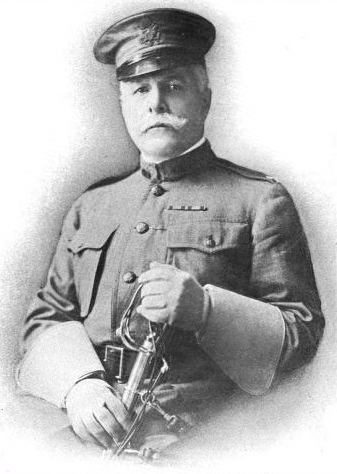
Macomb in Hawaii as a Brigadier General.

Upon returning to the United States in 1902 Macomb was appointed to the Army Ordnance Board and the Board of Ordnance and Fortification.

In 1904 and 1905 he was a US military attaché in Manchuria during the Russo-Japanese War, and observed the battles of Liaoyang, Shaho, and Mukden. Macomb used his observations in Manchuria to author several professional journal articles on the use of machine guns.

He commanded an artillery sub-post at Ft. Riley from 1906 to 1908 and organized the 6th Field Artillery Regiment, of which he was the first commander. From 1908 to 1910 he served on the Army staff at the War Department and as president of the Field Artillery Examining Board. He was promoted to brigadier general in November, 1910.

In 1910 Macomb was one of the founders of the United States Field Artillery Association, and served as its first president.

Macomb commanded the District of Hawaii from 1911 to 1913, and the Department of Hawaii from 1913 to 1914. He commanded the 1st Hawaiian Brigade from 1913 to 1914. During his assignments in Hawaii Macomb also served on the board of officers that surveyed Oahu and planned its defenses (the Macomb Board).

From 1914 to 1916 Macomb was President of the Army War College. He served on the Army staff from June to October, 1916, when he reached the mandatory retirement age of 64.

== World War I ==
Macomb requested to return to active duty for World War I. In October, 1917 he was appointed to command Fort Sill, where he oversaw the mobilization and training of soldiers preparing to serve in combat in France. He retired again in June, 1918.

Macomb was a hereditary companion of the District of Columbia Commandery of the Military Order of the Loyal Legion of the United States by right of his father's service in the Union Army during the American Civil War.

== Retirement, death and burial ==
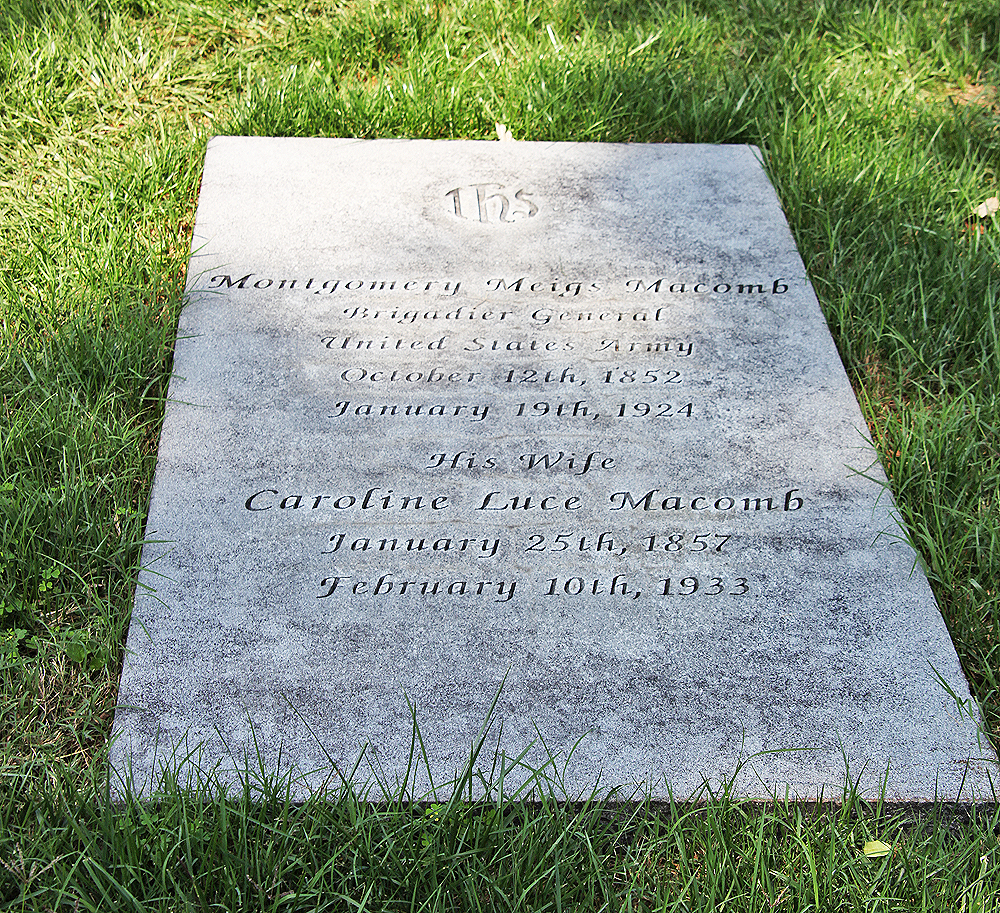
Macomb's burial site at Arlington National Cemetery.

In retirement Macomb resided in Washington, D.C. He died there on January 19, 1924 and was buried at Arlington National Cemetery, Section 1, Grave 157.

== Family ==
Macomb was married to Caroline Luce Walter Macomb (1857–1933), the daughter of Stephen Bleecker Luce, a Rear Admiral in the United States Navy and the first President of the Naval War College.

== Legacy ==
Macomb Ridge at Yosemite National Park is named for him. Macomb had mapped the Yosemite area as part of the Wheeler Survey.

Military offices
Preceded by Hunter Liggett	President of the United States Army War College; 1914–1916	Succeeded by Joseph E. Kuhn
