= USS Pulaski (1854) =

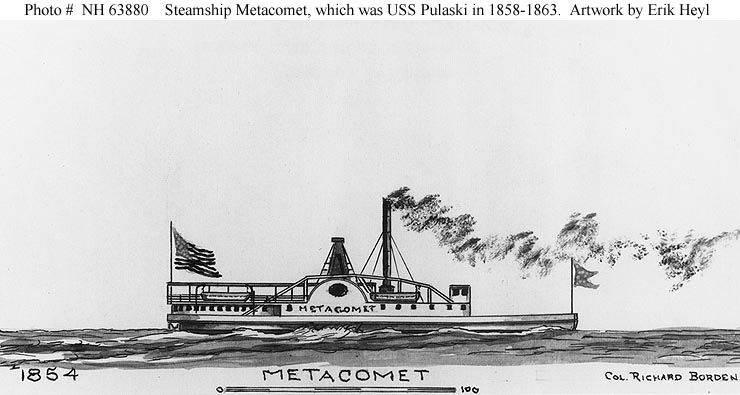
- Sketch of the Metacomet (later USS Pulaski)

History

United States
- Name: USS Pulaski
- Namesake: Casimir Pulaski
- Launched: 1854
- Acquired: by charter 1858; purchased, 1859
- Commissioned: 19 July 1861
- Decommissioned: 22 January 1863
- Fate: Sold, 1863

General characteristics
- Type: Steamer
- Displacement: 395 long tons (401 t)
- Length: 181 ft (55 m)
- Propulsion: Steam engine
- Complement: 163 officers and enlisted
- Armament: 3 × 12-pounder mortars

USS Pulaski, was a side-wheel steamship, in service with the United States Navy. She was named for Casimir Pulaski. Named Metacomet when built for commercial owners in 1854, she served as USS Pulaski from 1858 to 1863, when she was sold by the Navy.

Metacomet was built at New York City. She was chartered by the Navy in 1858 for use in the Paraguay expedition at monthly rate of $3,500, with an option to purchase her for $50,000. During the expedition she was commanded by Lieutenant William H. Macomb. In March 1859 she was deemed unseaworthy and not in a position to be navigated back to the United States.

Subsequently purchased and renamed USS Pulaski, she operated in South American waters from early 1859 until 22 January 1863, when she was decommissioned and sold by auction at Montevideo, Uruguay. In the first months of 1865 she was purchased by Paraguay. Until about 1870 she operated on the Río de la Plata as a civilian vessel.
