= David B. Macomb =

United States Navy admiral

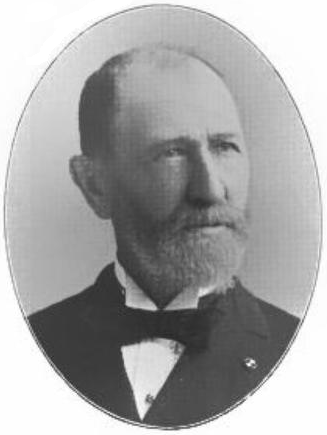
- Born: February 27, 1827; Tallahassee, Florida Territory
- Died: January 27, 1911 (aged 83); New York, New York, U.S.
- Military career
- Allegiance: United States of America
- Branch: United States Navy
- Service years: 1849–1889
- Rank: Rear admiral
- Conflicts: American Civil War

Rear Admiral David B. Macomb, USN (February 27, 1827 – January 27, 1911) was an admiral and engineering officer of the United States Navy. He served on blockade duty during the American Civil War, and was also a noted inventor.

== Family background and early life ==
Macomb's father, David Betton Macomb, came from a well-known family that had sided with the Crown during the American Revolution, but whose loyalties from the beginning of the 19th century had lain with the United States. His grandfather was William Macomb (a merchant at Detroit and member of the first parliament of Upper Canada), his grandfather's brother was Alexander Macomb the land speculator, and his father's first cousin was Maj. Gen. Alexander Macomb, the commanding general of the U. S. Army from 1828 to 1841.

David Betton (for clarity, referred to in this article as "David Sr.") Macomb was born at Detroit when it was still under British rule, and his mother would move the family to New York after his father's death in 1796. (By this time, uncle Alexander had made the family name notorious with his financial manipulations, and Sarah Macomb would choose to settle in Belleville, New Jersey, where she provided a home for at least three generations of her husband's family.) At some point during or shortly after the War of 1812, David Sr. made his way to Ohio, where his family name, and the heroism of his cousin, provided ideal introductions to local society.

Against the wishes of her family, in March 1816 David Sr. wed Mary Tiffin Worthington, daughter of Thomas Worthington, governor of Ohio. Although assisted by his wife's family and neighbors in Chillicothe, David Sr.'s business ventures repeatedly failed, and he struck out to make a new life in the Florida Territory in 1824, sending for his family the next year. The Macombs settled near Tallahassee, Florida, on a plantation that they called "Ben Venue"; David B. Macomb, their final child, was born there on February 27, 1827.

David Sr.'s efforts in commerce and law were no more successful in Florida than they had been in Ohio, and he left for Texas in the summer of 1835, where he quickly rose to a position of trust in the affairs of the revolutionary government, becoming a confidant of Stephen F. Austin and Sam Houston. The family stayed in Florida until about June 1836, when David Sr., who had returned to the States seeking munitions and other support, took the family to Texas, where David Sr. had bought property near the San Jacinto, close to present-day Houston. Mary Macomb took ill on the journey and died shortly after arriving in Texas, in October 1836. David Sr. committed suicide by slashing his throat in February 1837.

David and Mary Macomb left five children, some of whom stayed in Texas after their parents' deaths, although at least two of the three youngest—Louis (age 16 in 1837), Mary (13), and David (10)—were sent to their maternal grandmother in Ohio. Both Louis and Mary appear to have returned to Texas at the first opportunity. Oldest daughter Eleanor married, but died without surviving children in 1839; Both Mary and Tom, the oldest son, had surviving children at their deaths and may have living descendants. Louis is recorded as having died in either 1839 or 1889, in Houston.

== Early naval career ==
Macomb was appointed into the Navy as a third assistant engineer from Pennsylvania in January 1849, and was promoted to second assistant engineer in February 1851, on duty with the Coast Survey aboard USS Bibb (1853). He next served with the Ringgold Expedition which explored the North Pacific, the China seas and the Sea of Japan from 1853 to 1855, aboard the USS John Hancock (1850), initially under the command of his cousin, Lt. John Rodgers. After returning to the States, he was promoted to first assistant engineer in June 1856 and assigned to the Home Squadron flagship USS Wabash (1855), then was transferred to USS Saranac (1848) of the Pacific Squadron in 1858. In September 1861 he was promoted to chief engineer aboard USS Niagara (1855), which was detailed to escort the Japanese ambassadors during their return to Edo at the end of 1860. Niagara returned to American waters in April 1861, in time to be ordered as the first vessel to blockade Charleston, South Carolina, following the outbreak of armed rebellion.

== Civil War service ==
After the start of hostilities in 1861, he took part in the blockade of Charleston, and the bombardment of the Pensacola Navy Yard, aboard Niagara. He was detached from Niagara in early 1862 and detailed to Boston as superintendent of the building and fitting out of the monitors Nahant, Nantucket and Canonicus. He subsequently served as chief engineer on Canonicus with the James River flotilla and later, the North Atlantic Blockading Squadron.

Aboard Canonicus, he was present for the battle of Dutch Gap and the second clash at Deep Bottom in August 1864; later that year, Canonicus was ordered to Fort Fisher, North Carolina, and was there for the siege, reduction and surrender of that fort on January 15, 1865. That night, Canonicus and Monadnock were ordered to Charleston for similar duty; Canonicus would throw the last hostile shot at the rebels on Sullivan's Island, who were retreating in the early morning of February 18.

Following the surrender of Charleston, Canonicus and the rest of the squadron were sent in pursuit of the ironclad ram CSS Stonewall; this brought Canonicus to Havana, where she became the first American ironclad to enter a foreign port. Canonicus returned to the States on June 26, 1865.

== Legacy, later years and family ==
Following the war, Macomb was on inspection duty at the then-new Philadelphia Navy Yard at League Island, assigned to laying up the bulk of the Union ironclad fleet. He was assigned in 1866 to the Pensacola Navy Yard, then in 1868 to the Portsmouth Navy Yard. He was assigned in 1871 to USS Tennessee (1865), and was named Fleet Engineer of the North Atlantic Fleet, where he served from 1871 to 1873. He returned to the Portsmouth Navy Yard in 1879, and in 1882 he was named president of a board ordered by Congress to survey and appraise the Navy's surplus inventory, much of it dating to the Civil War. He remained in that duty until 1883, and then was assigned to the Boston Navy Yard, (the old Charlestown Navy Yard) where he remained until his retirement at the mandatory age of 62.

Macomb contributed several inventions to the Navy, and the greater maritime community, including the Macomb bilge strainer and the hydraulic lift used in the turrets of ironclads. He built and installed the first fresh-water maker in any U.S. Navy vessel.

Macomb retired February 27, 1889, with the relative rank of commodore. He was later promoted to rear admiral.

Macomb married Augusta H. Pope in Kittery, Maine, in 1858. They had three children; a son who died in infancy, and two daughters, one of whom died unmarried. Macomb's retirement home was in North Cambridge, Massachusetts, and he died January 27, 1911, in New York City.

== Namesake ==
In 1941, the destroyer USS Macomb (DD-458) was named in honor of Rear Admiral Macomb and his cousin, Commodore William H. Macomb (1818–1872). (They were simultaneously first and second cousins; William H. Macomb's mother Catherine and David Betton Macomb being brother and sister, while William H.'s father Alexander was David Betton Macomb's first cousin.)

Macomb Street in Tallahassee, Florida is named in his honor.

== See also ==
- Macomb (surname) for some of his near relations
