= 6th Field Artillery Regiment =

Military unit of the United States

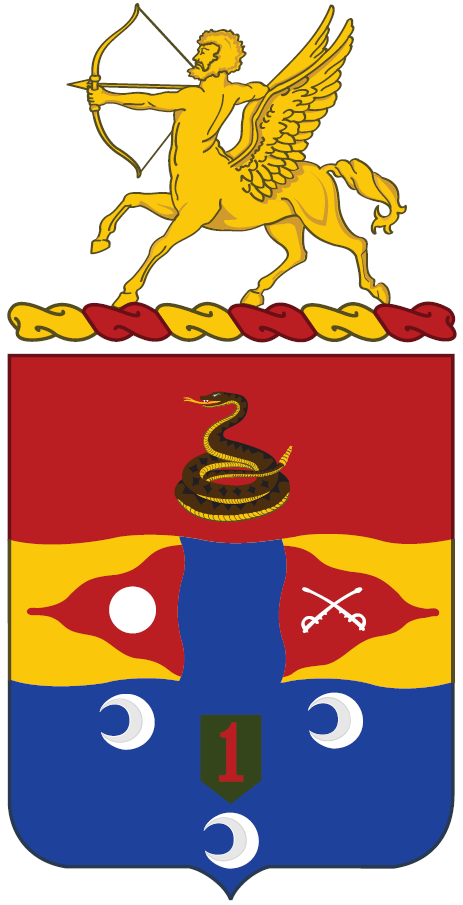
- Coat of arms
- Active: 1907
- Country: United States
- Branch: Army
- Type: Field artillery
- Mottos: Celer et Audax (Swift and Bold)

Commanders
- Notable commanders: Montgomery M. Macomb

Insignia
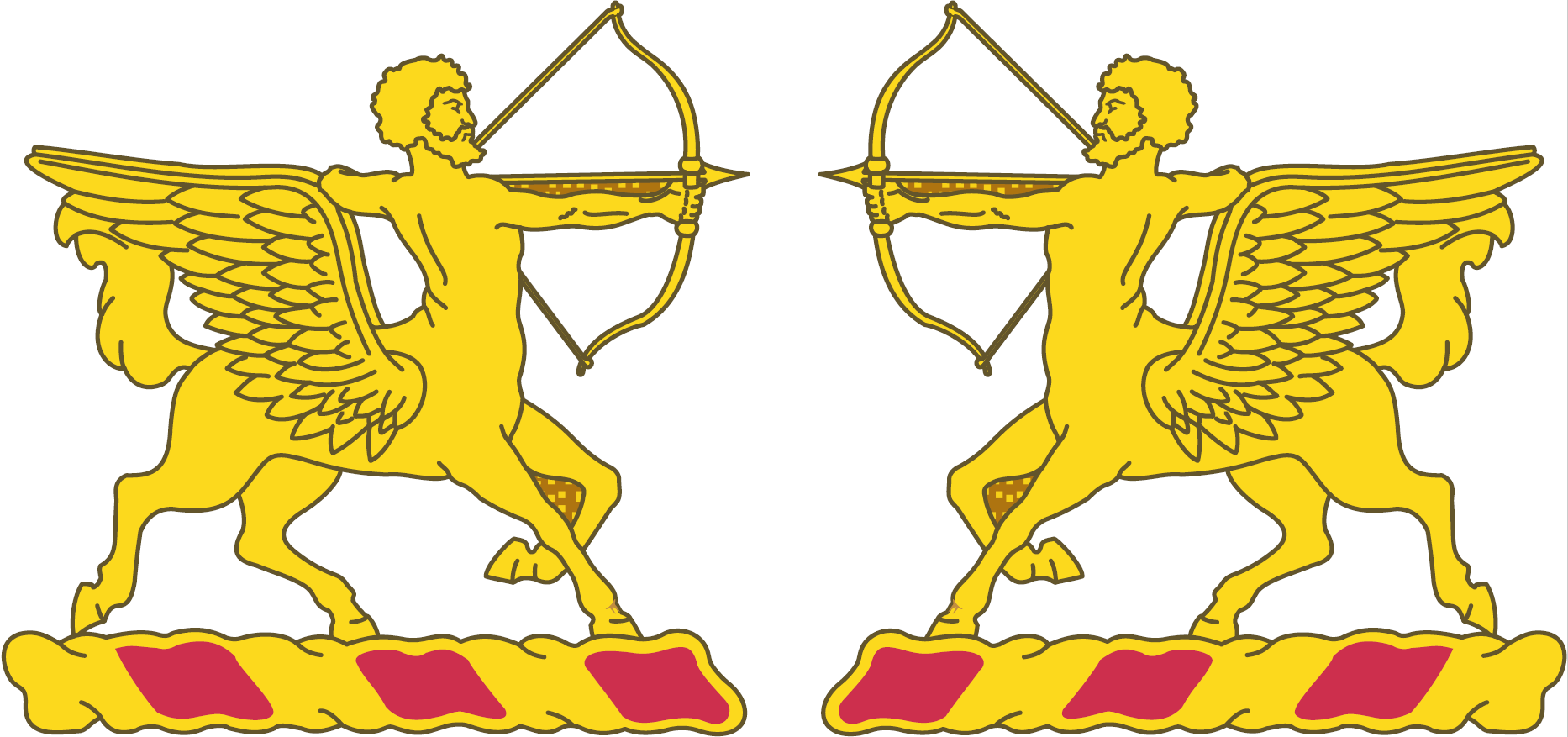
- Distinctive Unit Insignia: 6th Field Artillery Regiment Distinctive Unit Insignia

The 6th Field Artillery Regiment is a Field Artillery Branch regiment of the United States Army first activated in 1907 from numbered companies of artillery. It was first organized with two battalions.

6th Field Artillery assigned 8 June 1917 to the 1st Expeditionary Division [later redesignated as the 1st Division]; relieved 16 October 1939 from assignment to the 1st Division; assigned 22 June 1940 to the 8th Division; relieved 20 July 1940 from assignment to the 8th Division. The lineages of some of the units that make up the 6th Field Artillery include campaign credit for the War of 1812.

Note that the lineage of the "6th Regiment of Artillery" constituted 8 March 1898 is carried by the 6th Air Defense Artillery Regiment.

The regiment currently has five battalions.

== 1st Battalion ==
The 1st Battalion, 6th Field Artillery Regiment was constituted 27 April 1798 in the Regular Army as a company in the 3d Battalion, 2d Regiment of Artillerists and Engineers, and organized at Fort Jay, New York, as Captain James Stille's Company, 3d Battalion, 2d Regiment of Artillerists and Engineers. Constituted 27 April 1798 in the Regular Army as a company in the 3d Battalion, 2d Regiment of Artillerists and Engineers, and organized at Fort Jay, New York, as Captain James Stille's Company, 3d Battalion, 2d Regiment of Artillerists and Engineers

Redesignated 1 April 1802 as Captain James Stille's Company, Regiment of Artillerists

Redesignated 9 June 1805 as Captain John Fergus's Company, Regiment of Artillerists

Redesignated 30 June 1808 as Captain William Wilson's Company, Regiment of Artillerists

Redesignated 3 June 1809 as Captain Enoch Humphrey's Company, Regiment of Artillerists

Redesignated 11 January 1812 as Captain Enoch Humphrey's Company, Corps of Artillery

Redesignated 17 May 1815 as Captain Enoch Humphrey's Company, Corps of Artillery, Southern Division

Redesignated 21 August 1816 as Company C, 3d Battalion, Corps of Artillery, Southern Division

Redesignated 1 June 1821 as Company B, 4th Regiment of Artillery

Reorganized and redesignated 13 February 1901 as the 7th Battery, Field Artillery, Artillery Corps

(6th Field Artillery Regiment organized in 1907, with Colonel Montgomery M. Macomb as its first commander.)

Battery reorganized and redesignated 11 June 1907 as Battery D, 6th Field Artillery

Inactivated 1 August 1940 at Fort Hoyle, Maryland

Absorbed 4 January 1941 by Battery A, 6th Field Artillery Battalion (active) (Battery A, 6th Field Artillery, reorganized and redesignated 4 January 1941 as Battery A, 6th Field Artillery Battalion; [6th Field Artillery Battalion assigned 8 August 1942 to the 37th Infantry Division]; inactivated 13 December 1945 at Camp Anza, California; redesignated 24 July 1946 as Battery A, 6th Armored Field Artillery Battalion, and relieved from assignment to the 37th Infantry Division; activated 1 August 1946 at Fort Sill, Oklahoma)

Former Battery D, 6th Field Artillery, reconstituted 15 February 1957 in the Regular Army and redesignated as Headquarters and Headquarters Battery, 1st Howitzer Battalion, 6th Artillery, assigned to the 1st Armored Division, and activated at Fort Polk, Louisiana (organic elements concurrently constituted and activated)

Redesignated 3 February 1962 as the 1st Battalion, 6th Artillery (Headquarters and Headquarters Battery, 1st Battalion, 6th Artillery, concurrently consolidated with Battery D, 6th Antiaircraft Artillery Automatic Weapons Battalion [all organized in 1898 as the 6th Regiment of Artillery], and consolidated unit designated as Headquarters and Headquarters Battery, 1st Battalion, 6th Artillery)

Relieved 5 May 1971 from assignment to the 1st Armored Division and assigned to the 1st Cavalry Division

Redesignated (less former Battery D, 6th Antiaircraft Artillery Automatic Weapons Battalion) 1 September 1971 as the 1st Battalion, 6th Field Artillery (former Battery D, 6th Antiaircraft Artillery Automatic Weapons Battalion, concurrently redesignated as the 1st Battalion, 6th Air Defense Artillery – hereafter separate lineage)

1st Battalion, 6th Field Artillery, relieved 21 June 1975 from assignment to the 1st Cavalry Division, and assigned to the 18th Abn Corps Artillery, Ft Bragg, NC

Inactivated 1 October 1983 at Fort Bragg, North Carolina

Assigned 16 February 1996 to the 1st Infantry Division and activated in Germany. Assigned to the 3rd Brigade Combat team of the 1st Infantry Division and headquartered in Bamberg, Germany, 1–6 FA was only a short distance away from the wars in the former Yugoslavia. In 1997, 1st Battalion, 6th Field Artillery deployed to Bosnia and Herzegovina in support of Operation Joint Guard from 10 March 1997 until 10 October 1997. During this time they supported Task Force Eagle from a number of operating bases, providing convoy escorts, security and most importantly, fire support coverage of allied operations in the American area of responsibility. The excellence displayed by 1–6 FA resulted in the reception of the Army Superior Unit award upon return to Bamberg, Germany.

After their return from Bosnia, the Centaurs returned home and in early 1998, began to transition from the older M109A5 SP Howitzer to the highly advanced, highly accurate and extremely lethal M109A6 SP Howitzer, commonly referred to as the Paladin. In November 1999 the battalion was once again deployed, this time to Kosovo, where it pulled security at Camp Bondsteel and Camp Montieth until redeploying to Bamberg in the summer of 2000. They later deployed to Iraq as part of Multi-National Force - Iraq.

Redesignated 1 October 2005 as the 1st Battalion, 6th Field Artillery Regiment

Relieved 16 April 2007 from assignment to the 1st Infantry Division and assigned to the 3d Brigade Combat Team, 1st Infantry Division. 1-6 FA Deployed to Afghanistan June 2008 in support of Operation Enduring Freedom. They were deactivated along with 1st Infantry Division 3rd Brigade Combat Team after their deployment.

1-6 FA is now stationed in Grafenwoehr, Germany under the 41st Field Artillery Brigade since 11 July 2019 as an FAB MLRS unit.

=== Campaign participation credit ===
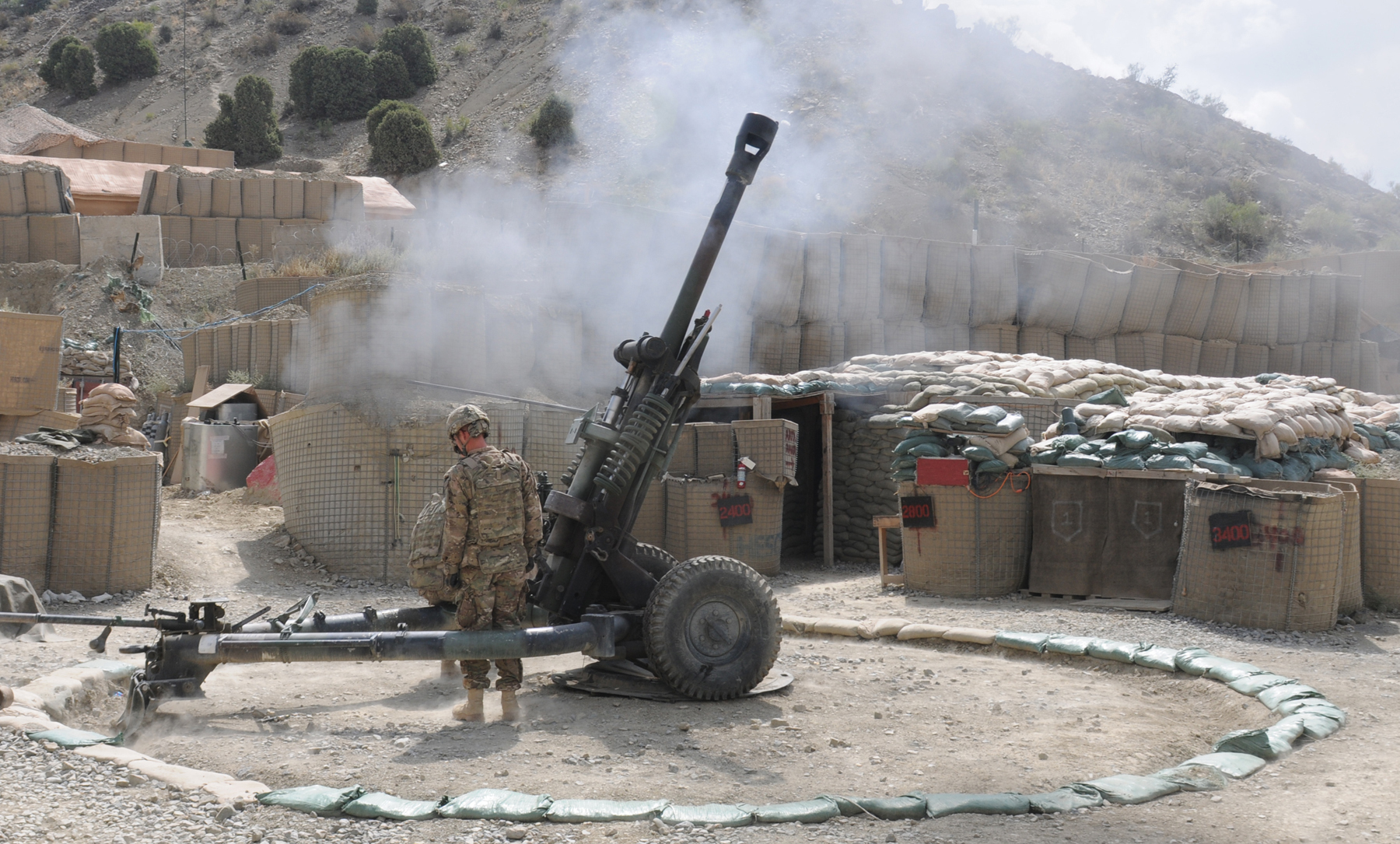
1st Platoon, Alpha Battery, 1st Battalion conducting a fire mission with an M119 Howitzer

War of 1812: *New Orleans

Indian Wars: *Creeks; *Seminoles; *Modocs; *Bannocks; *Utah 1860

Mexican War: *Buena Vista

Civil War: *Peninsula; *Manassas; *Antietam; *Fredericksburg; *Chancellorsville; *Gettysburg; *Wilderness; *Spotsylvania; *Cold Harbor; *Petersburg; *Maryland 1863; *Virginia 1863

War with Spain: *Santiago; *Puerto Rico

Mexican Expedition: Mexico 1916–1917

World War I: *Montdidier-Noyon; *Aisne-Marne; *St. Mihiel; *Meuse-Argonne; *Lorraine 1917; *Lorraine 1918; *Picardy 1918

World War II: *Northern Solomons; *Luzon (with arrowhead)

War on Terrorism: *Iraq 2004 to 2005 Baqubah, Iraq. *Afghanistan 2011. *Afghanistan 2013

=== Decorations ===
- Valorous Unit Award for BAQUBAH, IRAQ, FEB 2004 to Feb 2005, Permanent Order # 104–08, 14 April 2005
- Army Superior Unit Award for 1997
- French Croix de Guerre with Palm, World War I for LORRAINE-PICARDY
- French Croix de Guerre with Palm, World War I for AISNE-MARNE and MEUSE-ARGONNE
- French Croix de Guerre, World War I, Fourragere
- Philippine Presidential Unit Citation for 17 OCTOBER 1944 TO 4 JULY 1945

== 2nd Battalion ==
The 2nd Battalion, 6th Field Artillery was constituted 5 July 1838 in the regular army as Battery K, 1st regiment of artillery. It was organized 11 August 1838 at Fort Hamilton, New York.

Reorganized and redesignated 13 February 1901 as the 2d Battery, Field artillery, artillery Corps. reorganized and redesignated 11 June 1907 as Battery A, 6th Field Artillery.

6th Field Artillery was assigned 8 June 1917 to the 1st Expeditionary Division [later redesignated as the 1st Division]; relieved 16 October 1939 from assignment to the 1st Division; assigned 22 June 1940 to the 8th division; relieved 20 July 1940 from assignment to the 8th division.) reorganized and redesignated on 4 January 1941 as Battery A, 6th Field artillery Battalion.

6th Field Artillery Battalion was assigned on 8 August 1942 to the 37th infantry division. It was inactivated on 13 December 1945 at Camp Anza, California.

Redesignated on 24 July 1946 as Battery A, 6th armored Field artillery Battalion, and relieved from assignment to the 37th infantry division.

Reorganized and redesignated on 1 October 1957 as Headquarters and Headquarters Battery, 2d Howitzer Battalion, 6th artillery, and assigned to the 3d Armored Division (organic elements constituted 30 August 1957 and activated 1 October 1957).

Redesignated 1 September 1963 as the 2d Battalion, 6th Artillery (Headquarters and Headquarters Battery, 2d Battalion, 6th artillery, concurrently consolidated with Battery A, 6th Antiaircraft Artillery Automatic Weapons Battalion [organized in 1898], and consolidated unit designated as Headquarters and Headquarters Battery, 2d Battalion, 6th artillery). Reorganized and redesignated (less former Battery A, 6th Antiaircraft Artillery Automatic Weapons Battalion) on 1 September 1971 as the 2d Battalion, 6th Field Artillery (former Battery A, 6th Artillery Automatic Weapons Battalion, concurrently redesignated as the 2d Battalion, 6th Air Defense Artillery—hereafter separate lineage).

2d Battalion, 6th Field artillery, inactivated 16 June 1988 in Germany and relieved from assignment to the 3d Armored Division. All personnel were assigned to the 4th Battalion, 82nd Field Artillery Regiment on 16 June 1988.

=== Campaign participation credit ===
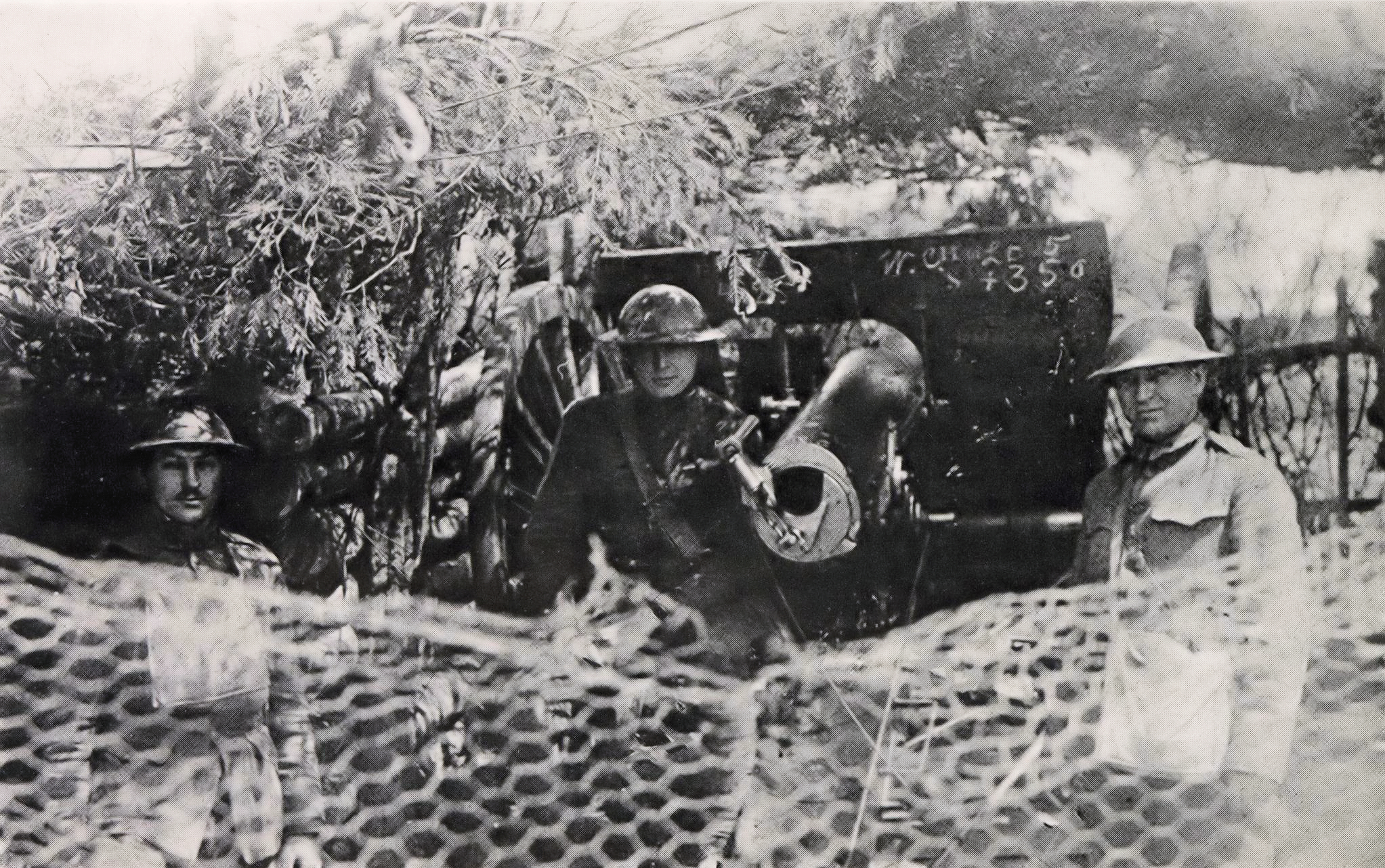
Battery E, 6th Field Artillery in WW I

Mexican War

- Monterey
- Vera Cruz
- Cerro Gordo
- Contreras
- Churubusco
- Chapultepec
- Mexico 1847

Civil War

- Peninsula
- Manassas
- Antietam
- Fredericksburg
- Chancellorsville
- Gettysburg
- Wilderness
- Spotsylvania
- Cold Harbor
- Petersburg
- Shenandoah
- Maryland 1863
- Virginia 1863

Indian Wars

- Comanches

War with Spain

- Santiago

Mexican expedition

- Mexico 1916–1917

World War I

- Montdidier-Noyon
- Aisne-Marne
- St. Mihiel
- Meuse-Argonne
- Lorraine 1917
- Lorraine 1918
- Picardy 1918

World War II

- Northern Solomons
- Luzon (with arrowhead)

=== Decorations ===
- French Croix de Guerre with Palm, World War i, Streamer embroidered Lorraine-Picardy (6th Field artillery cited; Wd GO 11, 1924)
- French Croix de Guerre with Palm, World War i, Streamer embroidered Aisne-Marne and Meuse-Argonne 6th Field artillery cited; Wd GO 11, 1924)
- French Croix de Guerre, World War I, Fourragere (6th Field artillery cited; Wd GO 11, 1924)
- Philippine Presidential Unit Citation, Streamer embroidered 17 October 1944 to 4 July 1945 (37th infantry division cited; da GO 47, 1950)

== 3rd Battalion ==
The 3rd Battalion, 6th Field Artillery was constituted 13 February 1901 in the Regular Army as the 22d Battery, Field Artillery, Artillery Corps. It was organized 5 October 1901 at Fort Douglas, Utah

Reorganized and redesignated 11 June 1907 as Battery B, 6th Field Artillery. It was inactivated 31 March 1930 at Fort Hoyle, Maryland. Activated 1 July 1940 at Fort Hoyle, Maryland

Reorganized and redesignated 4 January 1941 as Battery B, 6th Field Artillery Battalion (which was assigned on 8 August 1942 to the 37th Infantry Division).

Inactivated 13 December 1945 at Camp Anza, California

Redesignated 24 July 1946 as Battery B, 6th Armored Field Artillery Battalion, and relieved from assignment to the 37th Infantry Division

Activated 1 August 1946 at Fort Sill, Oklahoma, where it supported the Field Artillery School.

Reorganized and redesignated 25 June 1958 as Headquarters and Headquarters Battery, 3d Howitzer Battalion, 6th Artillery. The 3rd of 6th Artillery was deployed to the Republic of Vietnam during the Vietnam War in 1966 equipped with the M108 Self-Propelled Howitzer. Based at Camp Saint Barbara (later Artillery Hill) outside of Pleiku, the 3d Battalion, 6th Field Artillery, part of the 52nd Artillery Group, participated in 10 campaigns throughout the central highlands until it was redeployed to the United States in 1970 and inactivated on 10 April 1970. Between 1966 and 1970, the 3d Battalion, 6th Field Artillery participated in some of the most memorable & decisive events of the War in Vietnam.

Inactivated 10 April 1970 at Fort Lewis, Washington

3d Battalion, 6th Field Artillery, assigned 13 September 1972 to the 1st Infantry Division and activated at Fort Riley, Kansas

Headquarters and Headquarters Battery, 3d Battalion, 6th Field Artillery, reorganized and redesignated 16 March 1987 as Battery B, 6th Field Artillery, and remained assigned to the 1st Infantry Division.

Battery B, 6th Field Artillery, inactivated 15 September 1995 at Fort Riley, Kansas, and relieved from assignment to the 1st Infantry Division

Redesignated 16 December 1995 as Headquarters and Headquarters Battery, 3d Battalion, 6th Field Artillery, assigned to the 10th Mountain Division, and activated at Fort Drum, New York (organic elements concurrently activated)

Relieved 16 September 2004 from assignment to the 10th Mountain Division and assigned to the 1st Brigade Combat Team, 10th Mountain Division

In 2001 3/6 deployed to the Balkans

Redesignated 1 October 2005 as the 3d Battalion, 6th Field Artillery Regiment. In 2007–2008, 3rd of 6th Field Artillery was again deployed to northern Iraq with the "Warrior" Brigade, conducting combat patrols and artillery operations from FOB Warrior in Kirkuk, and FOB McHenry, just south of Kirkuk. Missions included the PEZ (Pipeline Exclusion Zone) security, training Iraqi army soldiers in urban warfare and joint security operations, as well as providing artillery support for sister infantry units 1st Bn 87th Infantry Regt and 2nd Bn 22nd Infantry Regt.

A, B and C Battery, 3rd Battalion, 6th Field Artillery have also deployed to Afghanistan and Iraq multiple times

=== Campaign participation credit ===
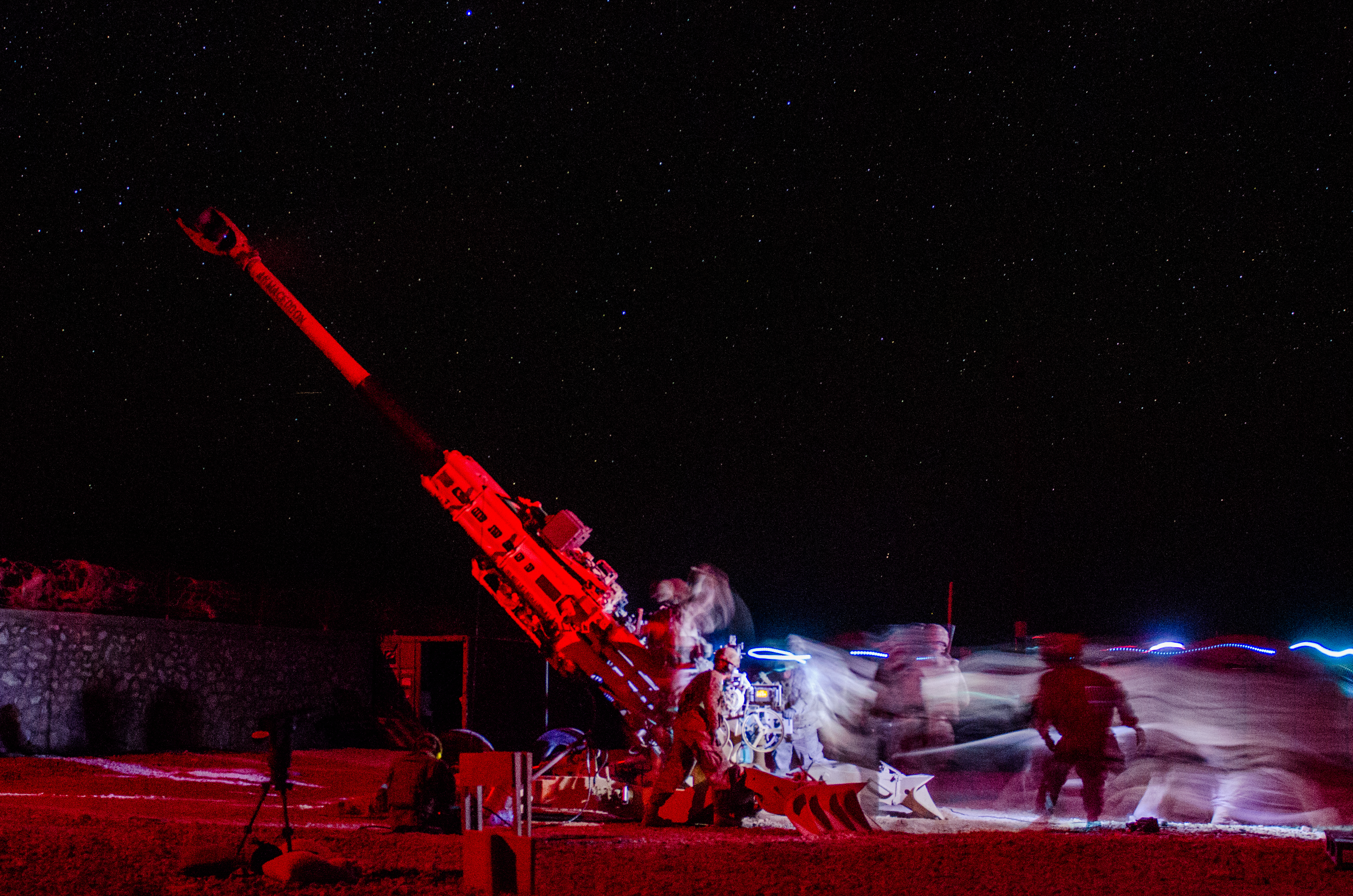
Time lapse of First Platoon, Alpha Battery, 3rd Battalion conducting a night-fire operation

Civil War: Peninsula; Manassas; Antietam; Fredericksburg; Chancellorsville; Gettysburg; Wilderness; Spotsylvania; Cold Harbor; Petersburg; Maryland 1863; Virginia 1863

War with Spain: Santiago

Mexican Expedition: *Mexico 1916–1917

World War I: *Montdidier-Noyon; *Aisne-Marne; *St. Mihiel; *Meuse-Argonne; *Lorraine 1917; *Lorraine 1918; *Picardy 1918

World War II: *Northern Solomons; *Luzon (with arrowhead)

Vietnam: *Counteroffensive; *Counteroffensive, Phase II; *Counteroffensive, Phase III; *Tet Counteroffensive; *Counteroffensive, Phase IV; *Counteroffensive, Phase V; *Counteroffensive, Phase VI; *Tet 69/Counteroffensive; *Summer-Fall 1969; *Winter-Spring 1970

Southwest Asia: *Defense of Saudi Arabia; *Liberation and Defense of Kuwait; *Cease-Fire

War on Terrorism: Campaigns to be determined

=== Decorations ===
- Meritorious Unit Commendation (Army), Streamer embroidered CENTRAL AND SOUTHWEST ASIA 2003–2004
- Meritorious Unit Commendation (Army), Streamer embroidered IRAQ 2005–2006
- French Croix de Guerre with Palm, World War I, Streamer embroidered LORRAINE-PICARDY
- French Croix de Guerre with Palm, World War I, Streamer embroidered AISNE-MARNE and MEUSE-ARGONNE
- French Croix de Guerre, World War I, Fourragere
- Philippine Presidential Unit Citation, Streamer embroidered 17 OCTOBER 1944 TO 4 JULY 1945
- Republic of Vietnam Cross of Gallantry with Palm, Streamer embroidered VIETNAM 1966–1967

Battery A additionally entitled to:

Valorous Unit Award, Streamer embroidered DAK TO-BEN HET

== Distinctive unit insignia ==
=== Description ===
A Gold color metal and enamel device 1 1/16 inches (2.7 cm) in height overall consisting of a shield blazoned: Per fess Gules and a base per pale of the first and Azure, on a fess wavy Or two sabers in saltire of the first behind a mullet of the second, in base two fleurs-de-lis of the third, in chief a rattlesnake coiled Vert. Attached below and to the sides of the shield a Gold scroll inscribed "CELER ET AUDAX" in Red letters.

=== Symbolism ===
The symbolism and pictorial content of the original coat of arms of the former 6th Field Artillery and 6th Coast Artillery have been retained with as little change as possible. The order on the shield represents oldest service at the top and most recent at the bottom. The rattlesnake is for service in the Mexican War by the 6th Field Artillery. The six rattles represent the numerical designation of both units. The crossed sabers represent Civil War service in the Army of the Potomac. The star represents service in the Philippine Insurrection, being taken from the banner of Katipunan; the two fleurs-de-lis are used to represent service in World Wars I and II. The motto is appropriate both to the horse and snake and is used as belonging to the older arms of service and translates to "Swift and Bold."

=== Background ===
The distinctive unit insignia was originally approved for the 6th Field Artillery Regiment on 1 April 1922. It was cancelled on 15 May 1959. The insignia was restored effective 1 September 1971.

The coat of arms was originally approved for the 6th Field Artillery Regiment on 29 August 1921. It was redesignated for the 6th Armored Field Artillery Battalion on 15 August 1946. It was cancelled on 15 May 1959. The insignia was restored and authorized for the 6th Field Artillery Regiment on 1 September 1971.

== Coat of arms ==
=== Blazon ===
- Shield – Per fess Gules and a base per pale of the first and Azure, on a fess wavy Or two sabers in saltire of the first behind a mullet of the second, fimbriated of the third in base two fleurs-de-lis of the last, in chief a rattlesnake coiled Proper.
- Crest – On a wreath Or and Gules a winged centaur courant armed with a bow and arrow.
- Motto – CELER ET AUDAX (Swift and Bold).

=== Symbolism ===
- Shield – The symbolism and pictorial content of the original coat of arms of the former 6th Field Artillery and 6th Coast Artillery have been retained with as little change as possible. The order on the shield represents oldest service at the top and most recent at the bottom. The rattlesnake is for service in the Mexican War by the 6th Field Artillery. The six rattles represent the numerical designation of both units. The crossed sabers represent Civil War service in the Army of the Potomac. The star represents service in the Philippine Insurrection, being taken from the banner of Katipunan; the two fleurs-de-lis are used to represent service in World Wars I and II.
- Crest – The crest is for service as the first horse artillery in the Army, by the 6th Field Artillery.
