= USS Shamrock =

Gunboat of the United States Navy

History

United States
- Launched: 17 March 1863
- Commissioned: 13 June 1864
- Decommissioned: 15 August 1865
- In service: 17 October 1865
- Out of service: 10 August 1868
- Fate: Sold on 1 September 1868

General characteristics
- Class & type: Sassacus-class gunboat
- Displacement: 974 tons
- Length: 205 ft (62 m)
- Beam: 35 ft (11 m)
- Draft: 8 ft 10 in (2.69 m)
- Depth of hold: 12 ft (3.7 m)
- Propulsion: steam engine; side wheel-propelled; double ended
- Speed: 13 knots (24 km/h; 15 mph)
- Complement: 160
- Armament: two 100-pounder Parrott rifles; four 9 in (229 mm) smoothbore Dahlgren guns; two 20-pounder Parrott rifles; two 24-pounder howitzers; one heavy 12-pounder smoothbore gun

USS Shamrock was a large (974 ton) seaworthy steamer with powerful guns, acquired by the Union Navy during the American Civil War. She was used by the Union Navy as a gunboat in support of the Union Navy blockade of Confederate waterways.

During the war, she participated in the operation of placing a spar torpedo into the ironclad CSS Albemarle, allowing Shamrock to sail on with the Union fleet to attack and capture Plymouth, North Carolina. After the war, she served in the Caribbean and voyaged to Europe prior to final decommissioning.

== Service history ==
Shamrock—a double-ended side wheel gunboat built at the New York Navy Yard—was launched on St. Patrick's Day, 17 March 1863; sponsored by. Miss Sallie Bryant, daughter of Mr. William Cullen Bryant; and commissioned on 13 June 1864, Cdr. William H. Macomb in command. The next day, Shamrock was ordered to proceed directly to the sounds of North Carolina for duty in that area as part of the North Atlantic Blockading Squadron. At that time, Union naval forces in the sounds were threatened by the Confederate ironclad ram, Albemarle, which in April had sunk Union side wheel steamer, USS Southfield, and had enabled Southern forces to recapture Plymouth, North Carolina. On the 20th, Shamrock reached Hatteras Inlet where orders awaited her to enter Albemarle Sound and take station off the mouth of the Roanoke River to guard against the reappearance of the formidable Rebel ram.

For the next four months, Shamrock's operations concentrated on protecting Union shipping from Albemarle, which was undergoing repairs up the Roanoke River. Late in October, Shamrock served as the mother ship of the steam launch which Lt. William Barker Cushing had brought to the sounds from New York City to attack Albemarle. On the night of 27 and 28 October 1864 Cushing and his team began working their way upriver. The small cutter accompanied them, the crew of which had the task of preventing the Confederate sentries stationed on a schooner anchored to the wreck of Southfield. Both boats, however, slipped past the schooner undetected, and Cushing decided to use all 22 men to try to capture Albemarle.

As they approached the Confederate docks, though, their luck turned. They were spotted and taken under heavy fire from both the shore and Albemarle. They closed with Albemarle and discovered that she was defended against approach by booms of floating logs. The logs, however, had been in the water for many months and were covered with slime, and the small craft rode over them without difficulty. When the small civilian craft was against the hull of the warship, Cushing stood up in the bow and detonated the explosive charge. The explosion threw everyone into the water. Cushing stripped off his uniform and swam to shore where he hid until daylight. That afternoon, he stole a small skiff and paddled down-river to rejoin the Union forces at the river's mouth. Of the other men in Cushing's boat, one escaped, two drowned, and eleven were captured. Cushing's attack blew a hole in Albemarle at the waterline "big enough to drive a wagon in." She sank in eight feet of water, which left her upper works still dry. Commander Alexander F. Worley, who had been appointed as her captain about a month earlier, salvaged her guns and shells and used them to defend Plymouth against subsequent Union attack—futilely, as it transpired.

Albemarle and the launch quickly sank and, for the first time since spring, Union naval forces enjoyed undisputed control of the North Carolina sounds. When the fortunate Cushing made his way back and reported his success, Comdr. Macomb—the senior naval officer in the area—promptly took advantage of his new ascendancy and attacked Plymouth, North Carolina. Shamrock, lashed to tug USS Bazely, led a fleet through the winding channels of Middle River on 30 October and the next day engaged the town's batteries and rifle pits from close range. USS Commodore Hull suffered heavy damage in the violent battle which ensued. After the Union bombardment detonated a large magazine, the Confederate defenders evacuated the fortress. Soon a landing party raised the Stars and Stripes over Plymouth.

Through the ensuing winter, Comdr. Macomb, in Shamrock, directed operations in the sounds, assuring the Union control of these strategic waters as General Ulysses S. Grant relentlessly tightened his grip on Richmond, Virginia, and General William Tecumseh Sherman pushed his army northward from Georgia through the Carolinas. On 20 March 1865, Macomb reported the raising of Albemarle. Shamrock remained in the sounds directing affairs afloat in the area for several months after the Confederate collapse. In mid-summer, she returned north and was decommissioned at the Philadelphia Navy Yard on 15 August.

Recommissioned on 17 October 1865, Shamrock next served in the Caribbean and was one of the nine ships comprising the West Indies Squadron which was reestablished on 2 December. The following year, the double ender crossed the Atlantic Ocean for service in European waters. She returned to the United States in July 1868 and was decommissioned at the Philadelphia Navy Yard on 10 August. Shamrock was sold on 1 September 1868 to Mr. E. Stannard of Westbrook, Connecticut.
