= Macomber =

Macomber may refer to:

== People ==
- A. Kingsley Macomber (1874–1955), American adventurer, businessman, horse owner and breeder
- Bart Macomber (1894–1971), American college football player
- Debbie Macomber (b. 1948), American author of romance novels
- Eleanor Macomber (1801–1840), American missionary, teacher
- Harold M. Macomber (1914–2002), American politician in Maine
- John D. Macomber (b. 1928), American banker
- John R. Macomber (1875–1955), American financier and sportsman
- Joshua Mason Macomber (1811–1881), American educator and physician
- Mary Lizzie Macomber (1861–1916), American artist
- Stanley Macomber (1887–1967), American inventor
- William B. Macomber Jr. (1921–2003), American diplomat

== Places ==
- Macomber, West Virginia, an unincorporated community in Preston County
- Macomber Mountain, a summit located in Adirondack Mountains of New York
- Macomber Reservation, conservation land in Framingham, Massachusetts, once part of the Raceland estate

== Structures ==
- Calvin T. Macomber House, a historic house in Bristol County, Massachusetts
- Macomber Stone House, a historic home located in Schenectady County, New York

== Other uses ==
- Eisner v. Macomber, a 1920 decision by the United States Supreme Court
- The Macomber Affair, a 1947 American adventure drama film based on the below Hemingway short story
- Macomber High School (Toledo, Ohio) a former public vocational school in Toledo, Ohio
- "The Short Happy Life of Francis Macomber", a short story by Ernest Hemingway published in 1936
