= McComb =

McComb can refer to:

- McComb (surname)

In Places:

- McComb, Mississippi
- McComb, Ohio (which was named for Alexander Macomb (American general)
- McComb (Amtrak station) in Mississippi
- McComb High School (Ohio)
- McComb School District in Mississippi
