= Macome =

Macome is the surname of:

- Agustín Macome (born 1967), Argentine former rugby union footballer
- Benjamín Macome (born 1986), Argentine rugby union footballer
- Milagre Macome, Mozambican basketball coach, head coach of the national team since 2023

== See also ==
- Macomb (disambiguation)
