= USS Rodman =

Gleaves-class destroyer

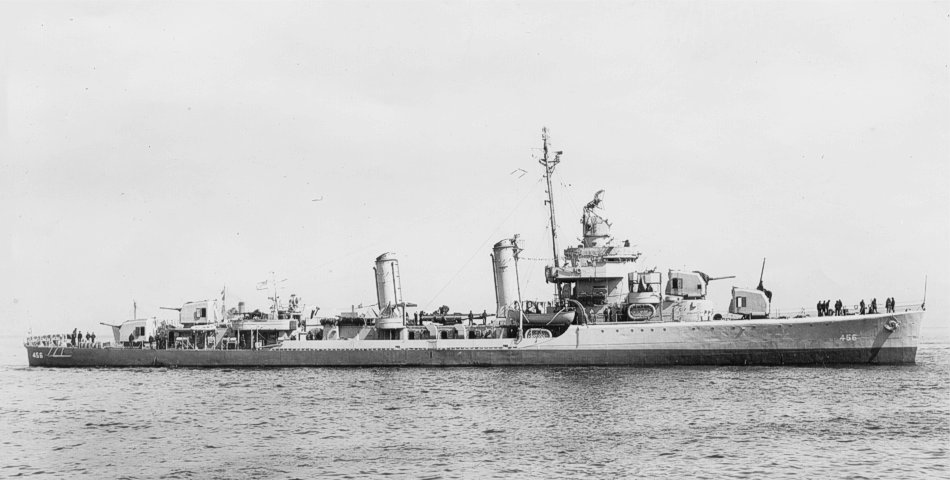
- USS Rodman (DD-456)

History

United States
- Name: USS Rodman
- Namesake: Hugh Rodman
- Builder: Federal Shipbuilding and Drydock Company
- Laid down: 16 December 1940
- Launched: 26 September 1941
- Commissioned: 27 January 1942
- Identification: DD-456
- Reclassified: DMS-21, 16 December 1944
- Decommissioned: 28 July 1955
- Fate: Transferred to Taiwan, 28 July 1955
- Stricken: 1 November 1972

Taiwan
- Name: ROCS Hsien Yang
- Acquired: 28 July 1955
- Identification: DD-16
- Fate: ran aground, c. 1969; name and pennant number reassigned to former USS Macomb (DD-458); expended for film purposes in 1976

General characteristics
- Class & type: Gleaves-class destroyer
- Displacement: 1,630 tons
- Length: 348 ft 4 in (106.17 m)
- Beam: 36 ft (11 m)
- Draft: 17 ft 5 in (5.31 m)
- Propulsion: 50,000 shp (37,000 kW); Westinghouse geared turbines; 4 boilers; 2 propellers
- Speed: 37 knots (69 km/h)
- Range: 6,500 nmi (12,000 km; 7,500 mi) at 12 kn (22 km/h; 14 mph); (12,000 km at 22 km/h)
- Complement: 16 officers, 260 enlisted
- Armament: (original); 4 × 5 in (127 mm) DP guns, 1 × 1.1 in (28 mm) quad gun, 6 × 0.5 in (12.7 mm) guns, 6 × 20 mm AA guns, 10 × 21 in (533 mm) torpedo tubes, 2 × depth charge tracks

USS Rodman (DD-456/DMS-21), a Gleaves-class destroyer, is the first ship of the United States Navy to be named for Admiral Hugh Rodman.

Rodman was laid down on 16 December 1940 by the Federal Shipbuilding & Dry Dock Co., Kearny, New Jersey and launched on 26 September 1941; sponsored by Mrs. Albert K. Stebbins Jr., grandniece of Admiral Rodman. The destroyer was commissioned on 27 January 1942.

== World War II ==
=== 1942 ===
Following shakedown, Rodman, assigned to Task Force 22 (TF 22), alternated training and patrol duties at NS Argentia, Newfoundland with screening and plane guard services for the aircraft carrier Ranger as that carrier trained aviation personnel along the northeast U.S. coast and ferried planes of the Army's 33rd Pursuit Squadron to Accra on the Gold Coast from 22 April to 28 May 1942. Detached in June, she departed Newport 1 July, escorted a seven-troopship convoy to the Firth of Clyde, then continued on to Orkney where, as a unit of TF 99, she commenced operations with the British Home Fleet. Based at Scapa Flow into August, she alternated patrols from Scotland and Iceland to protect the southern legs of the PQ/QP convoy lanes between those two countries and the north Russian ports of Murmansk and Archangel. With the long summer days, however, the U-boats and Norwegian based Luftwaffe units continued to exact a heavy toll. In early July, they destroyed Convoy PQ 17. Further convoys were postponed until the relative cover of the Arctic winter darkness could be regained.

Operation "Easy Unit" then came into being. Toward the end of July, Rodman was designated to assist in filling the increasing immediate logistics demands of the Russians, and of British and American personnel in northern Russia, and to prepare for bases, men, and equipment to provide air cover for the convoys when they resumed. On 17 August Rodman, with the cruiser Tuscaloosa and two other American destroyers departed Scapa Flow carrying medical personnel and supplies men, and equipment for the Royal Air Force's 144 and 145 Squadrons, ammunition, pyrotechnics, radar gear drystores, and provisions. Following the route taken by British destroyers three weeks earlier, they entered Kola Inlet after dark on 23 August. The Luftwaffe was grounded. The ships offloaded, refueled, took on merchant sailors survivors of ill-fated convoys, and departed Vaenga Bay on 24 August.

En route back to Scotland, the American ships were joined by Royal Navy destroyers. On 25 August, the British ships tracked the German minelayer Ulm — one of many ships and boats engaged in laying mines at the entrance to the White Sea and in the shallow waters off Novaya Zemlya — and sank her southeast of Bear Island (Norway).

Rodman arrived back in the Firth of Clyde on 30 August and on 1 September got underway for New York. An abbreviated overhaul at Boston followed and, at the end of the month, she resumed training and patrols off the U.S. northeast coast. On 25 October she sortied with Task Group 34.2 (TG 34.2) to support the amphibious force of TF 34 in Operation Torch, the invasion of North Africa. On 7 November, Task Unit 34.2.3 (TU 34.2.3), comprising the escort carrier Santee, destroyer Emmons, and Rodman left TG 34.2 and screened the Southern Attack Group to its destination. From then through 11 November, Rodman screened Santee, then put into Safi for replenishment. On 13 November Rodman retired, arrived at Norfolk on 24 November, thence proceeded to Boston where her 1.1-inch (28 mm) battery was replaced by 40 mm and 20 mm guns.

=== 1943 ===
In December she steamed to the Panama Canal whence she escorted a convoy back to the U.S. east coast, arriving at Norfolk on 7 January 1943. The next day she sailed again joining Ranger for two more ferry runs to Africa, this time to Morocco. During March and April, she remained in the western Atlantic, again ranging as far north as Argentia on patrol and escort duty. In May, she returned to the United Kingdom.

Arriving at Scapa Flow on 18 January, Rodman rejoined the Home Fleet. Into the summer she and her sister ships patrolled out of Scotland and Iceland and screened the larger ships of the combined force, including the battleships HMS Duke of York, USS South Dakota, and USS Alabama, as they attempted to draw the German fleet — particularly the battleship Tirpitz — out of the protected fjords.

With August, Rodman returned to the United States and by 1 September had resumed patrols at Argentia. Detached in October, she departed Norfolk 3 November for Bermuda whence she sailed in the advance scouting line screening the battleship Iowa then carrying President Franklin D. Roosevelt on the first leg of his journey to the Teheran Conference.

=== 1944 ===
Returning in mid-December, the destroyer guarded carriers on training exercises out of Newport and Portland, Maine, until April 1944. Then, on the 20th, she headed east with other units of her squadron, DesRon 10. On 1 May she arrived at Mers-el-Kebir, whence she operated as a unit of TG 80.6, a hunter-killer group formed to work with the North African coastal air squadrons against the U-boat menace to shipping in the 325-mile stretch between the Straits of Gibraltar and Oran. The Anglo-American air-sea effort, devised to keep U-boats submerged to the point of exhaustion and then overwhelm them as they surfaced, required time and patience, as well as coordination. It was instrumental in slicing the number of operational U-boats in the Mediterranean by over one-third between March and June.

On 14 May Rodman, with others of her squadron, departed Mers-el-Kebir to track a submarine which had sunk four merchantmen in less than two days. A 72-hour air-surface hunt ensued, but on the morning of 17 May, the damaged U-616 surfaced, was abandoned, and sank. The force picked up survivors and retired to Mers-el-Kebir only to sail for England the following day.

==== Invasion of France, Omaha Beach ====
On 22 May Rodman arrived at Plymouth and on 23 May assumed duties as CTU 126.2.1 for Operation Neptune, the naval phase of Operation Overlord the invasion of France. On 24 May, she conducted shore bombardment exercises. Then she waited. On 4 June the convoy B-1, formed, headed out across the English Channel, but then turned back, as the invasion was postponed one day. On 5 June the convoy again formed and headed east, this time continuing on to France and landing reinforcements on Omaha Beach on the afternoon of 6 June. Rodman, detached on arrival in the assault area, joined TG 122.4 and through 16 June provided gunfire support and patrolled in the Baie de la Seine. Brief respite at Plymouth followed, but on 18 June she returned to the Normandy coast. Back in English waters from 21 to 24 June, she joined TF 129 on 25 June as that force joined the Ninth Air Force in supporting the U.S. VII Corps (the 9th, 79th, and 4th Divisions) closing on Cherbourg.

==== Southern France ====
Rodman returned to England the same day, proceeded to sea again on 30 June; and, after a 3-day stop at Belfast, got underway for the Mediterranean to participate in Operation Dragoon ("Anvil"), the invasion of southern France. Arriving at Mers-el-Kebir on 11 July, she was en route to Sicily on 16 July, and into August operated between that island, the coast of Italy, and Malta.

On 11 August, assigned to TU 85.12.4, Rodman sailed from Taranto. Two days later French warships joined the formation; and on 15 August, the force arrived off the Delta assault area in the Baie de Bougnon. From 04:30 to 06:41, Rodman covered the minesweeping craft clearing the channels to the beaches. Two hours of shore bombardment followed. She then shifted to call fire support duties, which, with antiaircraft screening duties, she continued until retiring to Palermo on 17 August. Back off southern France on 22 August, she fired on shore batteries at Toulon on 23 August, covered minesweepers in the Golfe de Fos on 25 August, and in the Baie de Marseille on 26 August. Engaged in screening and patrol duties through the end of the month, she sailed for Oran on 2 September and for the next month and a half escorted men and supplies into the assault area.

==== Minesweeper conversion ====
In late October, Destroyer Squadron 10 escorted a convoy back to the United States. From New York Rodman continued on to Boston for conversion to a destroyer minesweeper. Emerging from the yard as DMS-21 on 16 December, she sailed for Norfolk the following week.

=== 1945 ===
==== Pacific theatre ====
On 1 January 1945, Rodman got underway for the Pacific. During the remainder of that month and into February, she conducted minesweeping and gunnery exercises off California and in Hawaiian waters, then sailed west. On 12 March she anchored at Ulithi and seven days later sailed for the Ryukyus and her last amphibious operation, "Iceberg". On 24–25 March she participated in minesweeping operations off Kerama Retto, then prepared for the assault on Okinawa.

==== Okinawa ====
After 1 April landings on the Hagushi beaches, she remained in the area and was caught in the air-surface action which enveloped the island on 6 April. Assigned to picket duty early that day, she later shifted to screening duties and joined Emmons in covering small minecraft sweeping the channel between Iheya Retto and Okinawa. In midafternoon a large flight of kamikazes flew over. At 15:32 their leader dived out of the clouds and crashed into Rodman' port bow. His bomb exploded under her. Sixteen men were killed or missing, 20 were wounded, but Rodman's engineering plant remained intact. Emmons commenced circling Rodman to provide antiaircraft fire as other kamikazes closed in. Six were splashed. Marine Corps F4U Corsairs arrived, joined in, and scored on 20, but not before others got through. Rodman was hit twice more during the 3½-hour battle. Emmons splashed six more, but was hit by five and damaged by four near misses. Her hulk was sunk the next day.

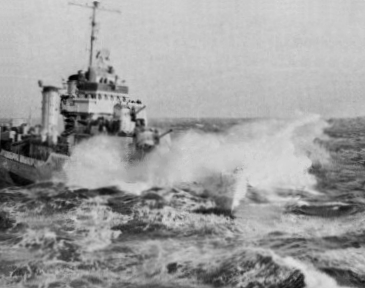
USS Rodman underway, in 1954.

From 7 April to 5 May Rodman underwent temporary repairs at Kerama Retto, then started her journey back to the United States. Arriving at Charleston Navy Yard on 19 June, her repairs were completed in mid-October, and on the 22nd she sailed for Casco Bay for refresher training.

==== Post war ====
For the next three years, she operated along the U.S. east coast, ranging from Newfoundland to the Caribbean; then, in September 1949, deployed to the Mediterranean. There for only two weeks, she resumed her western Atlantic operations and during the next six years sailed twice more to the Mediterranean, both times for 5-month tours with the 6th Fleet, 2 June to 1 October 1952 and 19 January to 17 May 1954 with a short diversion to Charleston, South Carolina to serve in the role as the fictitious USS Caine in the film The Caine Mutiny.

Reclassified DD-456 on 15 January 1955, she decommissioned 28 July 1955 and was transferred the same day to the Republic of China to serve as ROCS Hsien Yang (DD-16).

In ROCN service she became infamous for being involved in collisions twice in 1956 and was subsequently nicknamed "Gōng Yáng" ("ram"). After she ran aground c. 1969, her ROCN name and ROCN pennant number were reassigned to the former USS Macomb, which was acquired in 1970.

Rodman earned five battle stars during World War II.
