= McCombie =

McCombie is a surname. Notable people with the surname include:

- Andy McCombie (1876–1952), Scottish international footballer
- Karen McCombie (born 1963), author of children and young adult novels
- William McCombie (1805–1880), Scottish agriculturist famed for a herd of black-polled cattle

== See also ==
- Barton–McCombie deoxygenation, organic reaction replacing a hydroxy group with hydrogen to give an alkyl group
