= McCombs =

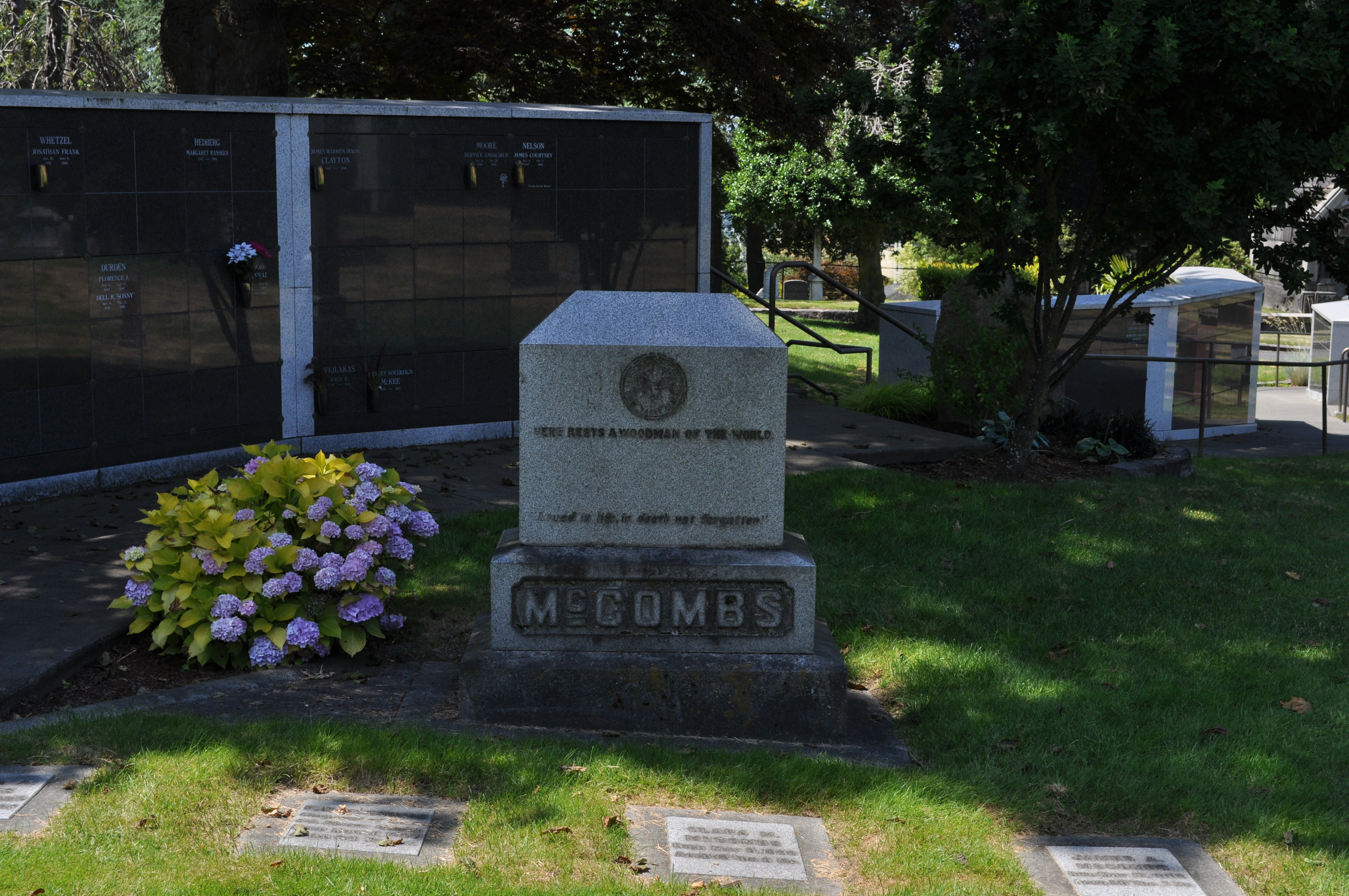

McCombs is a surname. Notable people with the surname include:

- Cal McCombs (b. 1945), American football player and coach
- Cass McCombs (b. 1977), American musician
- Davis McCombs (b. 1969), American poet
- Doug McCombs (b. 1962), American musician
- Elizabeth McCombs (1872–1935), New Zealand politician
- Holland McCombs (1901–1991), American journalist
- James McCombs (1873–1933), New Zealand politician
- Red McCombs (1927–2023), American businessman
- Ryan McCombs (b. 1974), American musician
- Terry McCombs (1905–1982), New Zealand politician
- W. Eugene McCombs (1925–2004), American politician
- William F. McCombs (1876–1921), American lawyer and political operative

== See also ==
- Red McCombs Media
- Red and Charline McCombs Field, softball field at The University of Texas at Austin
- McCombs School of Business, business school at The University of Texas at Austin
