= McComish =

Name list

McComish is a surname. Notable people with the surname include:

- John McComish (born 1943), American politician
- Mike McComish (born 1983), Northern Irish rugby player
