= William H. Macomb =

United States Navy officer

- Born: June 16, 1818; Detroit, Michigan
- Died: August 16, 1872 (aged 54); Philadelphia, Pennsylvania
- Military career
- Allegiance: United States of America
- Branch: United States Navy; Union Navy
- Service years: 1834–1872
- Rank: Commodore
- Commands: USS Plymouth; USS Shamrock; USS Genesee; USS Pulaski
- Conflicts: Second Opium War; Paraguay Expedition; American Civil War

Commodore William Henry Alexander Macomb (June 16, 1818 – August 12, 1872) was an officer in the United States Navy who served during the American Civil War. He commanded four warships during his military career, each time serving as the first commanding officer of that vessel.

== Biography ==
Born in Detroit, Michigan, Macomb was the son of Major General Alexander Macomb, who served as commanding general of the United States Army. He joined the navy from New York state on April 10, 1834 as a midshipman, attended the Naval School in Philadelphia, Pennsylvania in 1840 and was promoted to lieutenant on February 27, 1847. He married Mary Eliza Stanton (his sister's step-daughter) on January 17, 1844 in Fort Hamilton, New York.

From 1856 to 1858, Macomb served aboard the sloop Portsmouth in the East India Squadron. In November 1856, his ship participated in the Battle of the Barrier Forts at Canton. During the 1858–1859 Paraguay expedition, Macomb commanded the steamer Pulaski. He continued to serve as the commanding officer of Pulaski in the Brazil Squadron until 1861.

Macomb served with distinction during the Civil War, being promoted to commander on July 16, 1862. From her commissioning in July 1862 until September 1863, he served as the commanding officer of the steamer Genesee, taking part in the riverine warfare along the Mississippi. From her commissioning in June 1864 until August 1865, Macomb commanded the steamer Shamrock in the North Atlantic Blockading Squadron. He led the naval force which captured Plymouth, North Carolina, and led an expedition up the Roanoke River in North Carolina. For his gallantry in action with the North Atlantic Squadron, he was promoted to captain on July 25, 1866.

After the war, Macomb was assigned to the Philadelphia Navy Yard from 1866 to 1868. He was elected as a companion of the Pennsylvania Commandery of the Military Order of the Loyal Legion of the United States (MOLLUS) on September 19, 1866. He was assigned MOLLUS insignia number 373.

From her commissioning in January 1869 until June 1870, Macomb served as commander of the sloop-of-war Plymouth in the European Squadron. He was promoted to commodore on July 1, 1870.

Commodore Macomb died in Philadelphia, Pennsylvania while serving as a lighthouse inspector. He was buried at Woodlands Cemetery in Philadelphia.

== Namesake ==
In 1941, the destroyer USS Macomb (DD-458) was named in honor of Commodore Macomb and his first cousin, Rear Admiral David B. Macomb (1827–1911).
