= John Navarre Macomb Jr. =

American topographical engineer and explorer

John Navarre Macomb, Jr.
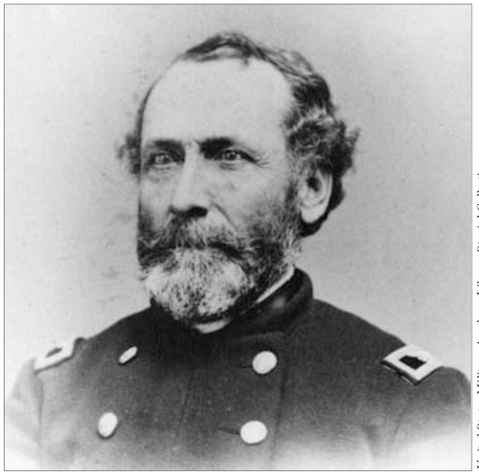
- John Navarre Macomb, Jr.
- Born: April 9, 1811; New York City
- Died: March 16, 1889 (aged 77)
- Burial place: Arlington National Cemetery
- Spouse(s): Czarina Carolina Macomb (1838–1846) (died); Ann Minerva Rodgers ("Nannie") (1850–?)
- Military career
- Allegiance: United States of America
- Branch: United States Army
- Rank: Colonel
- Conflicts: American Civil War

John Navarre Macomb Jr. (1811–1889) was a United States Army topographical engineer and explorer of the Colorado River. Macomb led the 1859 San Juan Exploring Expedition, whose purpose was to find a military supply route from Santa Fe, New Mexico, to Utah and to map previously unexplored areas along the route. The expedition included the botanist and geologist John Strong Newberry, who made notable scientific observations along the route.

== Early life ==
Macomb was born on 9 April 1811 in New York City, and was the great-grandson of Philip Livingston, a signer of the Declaration of Independence. Am 1832 graduate of West Point, he participated in the Black Hawk Expedition. He married a cousin, Czarina Carolina Macomb, in 1838, with whom he had two children. She died in 1846. Macomb remarried in 1850, to Ann Minerva Rodgers ("Nannie"), with whom he had six children. He was promoted to captain in the Corps of Topographical Engineers in 1851 and conducted surveys in the Great Lakes until 1856. That year, he was named chief topographical engineer of the territory of New Mexico.

== Macomb Expedition ==
The Macomb Expedition of 1859 was a consequence of the Utah War, in which the U.S. Army had suffered from serious logistical difficulties. Macomb sought to find a route for military supplies from Santa Fe to central Utah, and also to map the unexplored regions along the route. Though originally political and military in nature, the expedition became "a quintessential scientific endeavor".

Macomb's legacy would include a stone survey monument that would bear his name and eventually become a part of some geographical intrigue and a few border disputes between New Mexico and both Colorado and Texas, eventually being replaced by Levi S. Preston's Preston Monument in 1900. The tri-point for the present states of Oklahoma, Colorado, and New Mexico is supposed to be the intersection between the 37th parallel north and the 103rd meridian west, where Macomb placed a monument in 1859. At this time, the monument was to be the southwest corner of Kansas Territory.

I was directed, on my return to Santa Fé, to reduce my party and come in to Washington to prepare my report, and, on my way, to stop at the southwest corner of the Territory of Kansas, to set up a new monument at a point some two and a quarter miles to the east of the one originally placed there. I accordingly diverged from the usual route across the plains from Fort Union and went up the Cimarron River to the point indicated, and retraced that part of the thirty-seventh parallel from the old monument to the meridian of 103°, as laid down upon the map accompanying my instructions, and at the intersection of these two geographical lines I erected a rough stone monument. The original monument above alluded to is of earth and sods. This duty was finished about the middle of November, 1859, when the thermometer was ranging from zero to about 16 °[F] above.

The earlier monument which Macomb was referring to had been placed two years earlier by Joseph Eggleston Johnston but had been determined to be two miles (and nearly 3 minutes of longitude) west of its intended location.

However, the outbreak of the American Civil War delayed publication of the report of the expedition until 1876, and it has tended to be overshadowed by the great survey expeditions of the post-Civil War period.

== American Civil War ==
Macomb served as a staff officer during the Civil War.

== Later life ==
Macomb died in Washington, D.C., on March 16, 1889.

== See also ==
- Macomb (surname) for some of his near relations
