= Macomber Stone House =

Historic house in New York, United States

- U.S. National Register of Historic Places
- Location within New York Location within the United States
- Location: Barton Hill Rd., Duanesburg, New York
- Coordinates: 42°43′17″N 74°12′52″W
- Area: 99.5 acres (40.3 ha)
- Built: ca. 1836
- Architectural style: Federal, Vernacular Federal
- MPS: Duanesburg MRA
- NRHP reference No.: 84003266
- Added to NRHP: October 11, 1984

Macomber Stone House is a historic home located in Duanesburg in Schenectady County, New York. It was built about 1836 and is a two-story, five-bay, center hall vernacular Federal style dwelling with a gable roof and narrow cornice. It is constructed of field dressed random ashlar, local limestone. Also on the property are three contributing 19th century frame barns with clapboard siding.

The property was covered in a 1984 study of Duanesburg historical resources. It was listed on the National Register of Historic Places in 1984.
