= Calvin T. Macomber House =

Historic house in Massachusetts, United States

- U.S. National Register of Historic Places
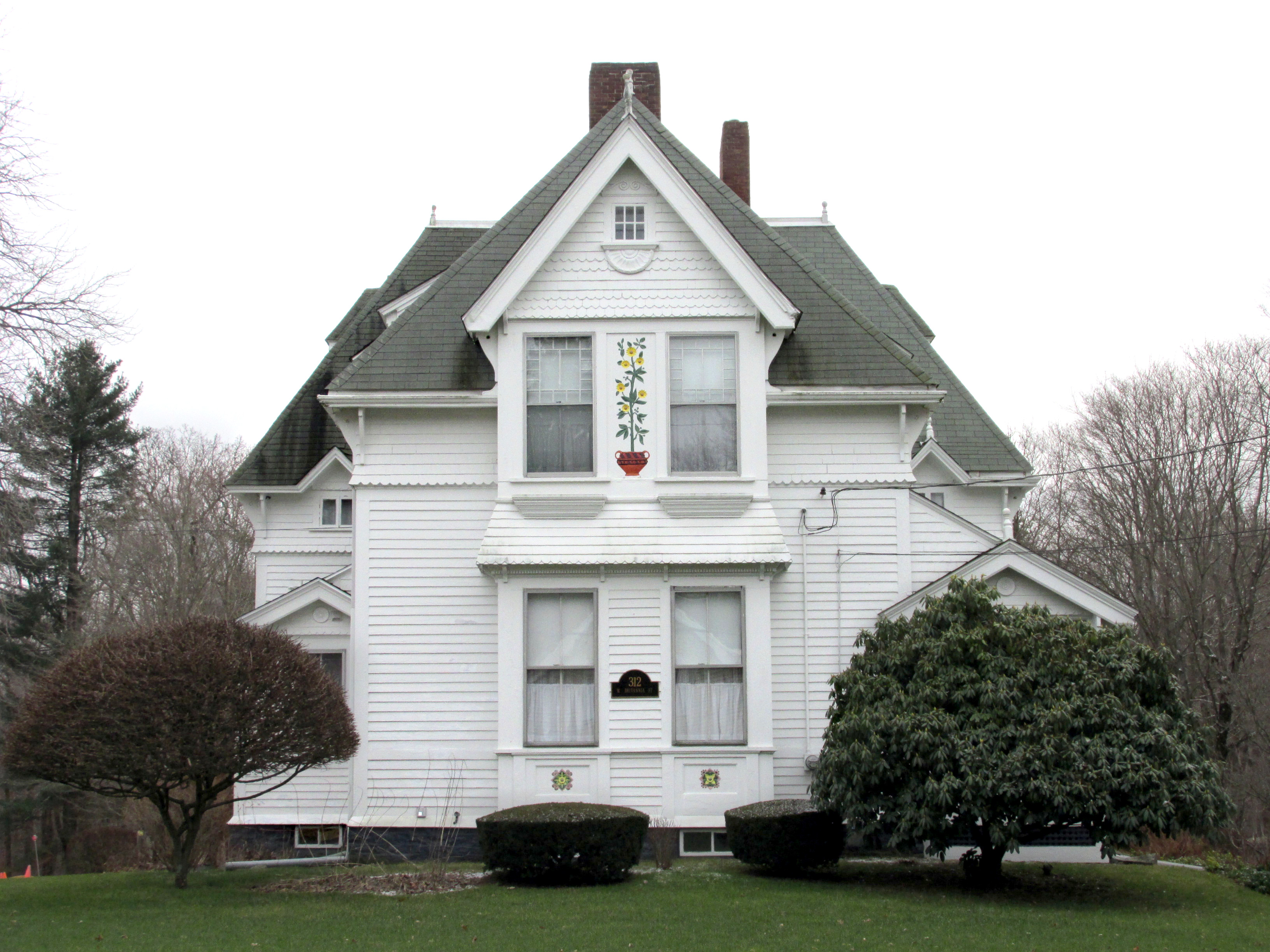
- 312 West Brittania Street

- Location within Massachusetts Location within the United States
- Location: Taunton, Massachusetts
- Coordinates: 41°55′6″N 71°6′25″W
- Built: 1885
- Architectural style: Queen Anne
- MPS: Taunton MRA
- NRHP reference No.: 84002174
- Added to NRHP: July 5, 1984

The Calvin T. Macomber House is a historic house located at 312 W. Brittania Street in Taunton, Massachusetts. It was built in 1885 for Calvin T. Macomber, who was employed at Reed & Barton. It among the most complex examples of the Queen Anne style houses in the city, with an asymmetrical plan and a variety of architectural details. It has a steep hip roof, which is broken up by tall chimneys, projecting sections, and gabled dormers. Second floor windows have trim decorated with floral motifs.

The house was added to the National Register of Historic Places in 1984.

== See also ==
- National Register of Historic Places listings in Taunton, Massachusetts
