= USS Macomb =

Gleaves-class destroyer

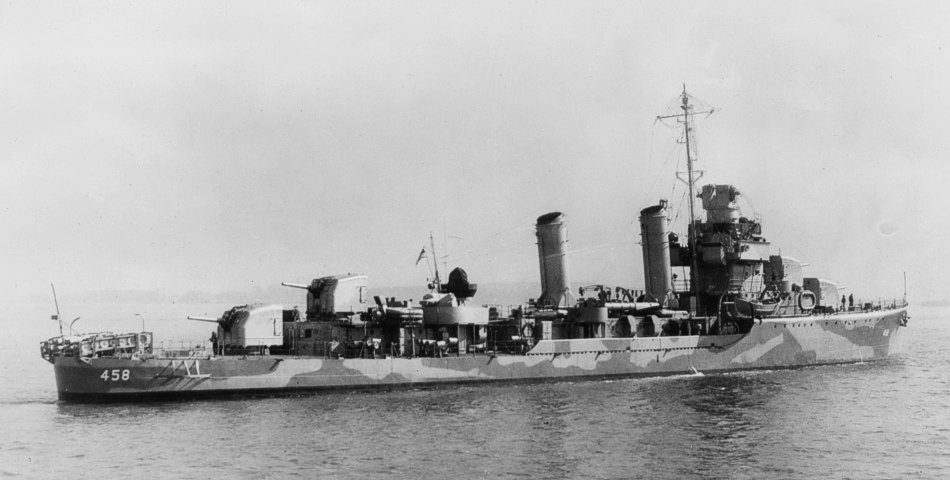
- USS Macomb (DD-458) off Boston in 1942.

History

United States
- Name: USS Macomb
- Namesake: William H. and David B. Macomb
- Builder: Bath Iron Works
- Laid down: 3 September 1940
- Launched: 23 September 1941
- Commissioned: 26 January 1942
- Identification: DD-458
- Reclassified: DMS-23, 15 November 1944
- Decommissioned: 19 October 1954
- Fate: Transferred to Japan, 19 October 1954
- Stricken: 1 February 1970

Japan
- Name: JDS Hatakaze
- Acquired: 19 October 1954
- Identification: DD-182
- Fate: Returned to U.S., 1969; sold to Republic of China, 1970

Taiwan
- Name: ROCS Hsien Yang
- Acquired: 1970
- Decommissioned: 1974
- Stricken: Converted to dockside training ship
- Identification: DD-16
- Fate: Cannibalized for spare parts.

General characteristics
- Class & type: Gleaves-class destroyer
- Displacement: 2,230 tons
- Length: 348 ft 2 in (106.12 m)
- Beam: 36 ft 1 in (11.00 m)
- Draft: 15 ft 8 in (4.78 m)
- Propulsion: 50,000 shp (37,000 kW); 4 boilers; 2 propellers
- Speed: 35 knots (65 km/h)
- Range: 6,500 nmi (12,000 km; 7,500 mi) at 12 kn (22 km/h; 14 mph)
- Complement: 208
- Armament: 4 × 5 in (127 mm) DP guns, 5 × 40 mm AA guns, 5 × 20 mm AA guns, 5 × 21 in (533 mm) torpedo tubes, 6 × depth charge projectors, 2 × depth charge tracks

USS Macomb (DD-458/DMS-23) was a Gleaves-class destroyer of the United States Navy, named for Commodore William H. Macomb (1818–1872) and Rear Admiral David B. Macomb (1827–1911).

Macomb was laid down on 3 September 1940 by the Bath Iron Works Corp., Bath, Maine and launched on 23 September 1941; cosponsored by Mrs. Ryland W. Greene and her sister, Mrs. Edward H. Chew, granddaughters of Commodore William H. Macomb. The destroyer commissioned on 26 January 1942.

== Service history ==
=== Atlantic service ===
Following shakedown, she operated off the east coast escorting convoys and aircraft carriers. These convoy missions took Macomb south to the northern coast of South America, east to the West African coast, and north to Newfoundland. Standing out of Boston on 5 July 1942, Macomb escorted a U.S. Army transport and an English ship to Greenock, Scotland, arriving 12 July. She operated between Scotland and Iceland making one round-trip voyage to New York for availability, until 25 September 1942, when she anchored at Norfolk, Virginia Departing Norfolk on 11 October, she screened aircraft carrier anti-submarine patrols in the Caribbean until heading for the north African coast 7 November. Arriving on the 11th, she acted as carrier screen during the landings at Casablanca and returned to Boston after the landings were secure.

After overhaul at Boston, Macomb again operated as convoy escort along the east coast and in the Caribbean. Following a cruise which took her close to the coast of north Africa, the destroyer commenced operating out of NS Argentia, Newfoundland, on North Atlantic patrol. While on this patrol her convoy and antisubmarine duties took her to Iceland and England. During this early 1943 period, German submarines were extremely active, sinking many Allied ships with their "wolf packs".

In August 1943 Macomb returned from a tour of duty with the British Home Fleet and operated again off the Atlantic seaboard with only one break until mid-1944. On this one exception she made an uneventful cruise to the Azores; Freetown, Sierra Leone; Dakar, Senegal; and Bermuda before returning to Boston in late December.

On 20 April 1944, the destroyer got underway for the Mediterranean where she operated off the Algerian coast on antisubmarine duty. On 18 May, just before midnight, she commenced a 72-hour submarine chase that ended when U-616 was blasted to the surface by Macomb's depth charges and then sunk by her guns. In mid-August 1944 she took part in the invasion of southern France, returning to antisubmarine patrol afterward Macomb arrived at Charleston Navy Yard 9 November for conversion to a destroyer minesweeper.

=== Pacific service ===
==== Okinawa ====
Redesignated DMS-23, 15 November, she joined Mine Squadron 20 (MineRon 20) and, after refresher training, departed for the Pacific 3 January 1945. Arriving in the western Pacific in mid-March, Mine Squadron 20 Joined Task Group 52.2 (TG 52.2) and steamed toward Okinawa. They were the first task group to enter Okinawan waters and remained until after the completion of the operations. Only one of the 11 ships in the squadron escaped kamikaze hits, and one, Emmons, was sunk on 8 April. The squadron suffered some 300 casualties, including over 100 killed. Macomb, participating in the entire campaign, shot down many enemy planes. On 27 April, in the early predawn hours, an enemy aircraft raid was picked up by her radar. For an hour Macomb fired almost continuously while maneuvering at top speed; three planes were splashed. Her luck ran out on 3 May during a twilight enemy raid. She downed one Japanese plane but a second came in fast and crashed into her, causing extensive damage and killing 7 men. For this campaign, Macomb was awarded the Navy Unit Commendation for having, "...by her own aggressiveness and the courage and skill of her officers and men, contributed essentially to the success of the Okinawa invasion..."

Macomb proceeded to Saipan for battle repairs following the 3 May engagement. Soon after the repairs were completed, the war's end was announced. Macomb rendezvoused with the 3d Fleet on 13 August en route to the Japanese home islands. On 29 August, Just ahead of the battleships Missouri and Iowa, she dropped anchor in Tokyo Bay, where she was witness to the formal surrender.

Leaving Tokyo Bay on 4 September 1945, she commenced sweeping mines in the Japanese area, off Okinawa, near the entrance to the Yellow Sea, and in the Chosen Straits.

=== 1945 – 1954 ===
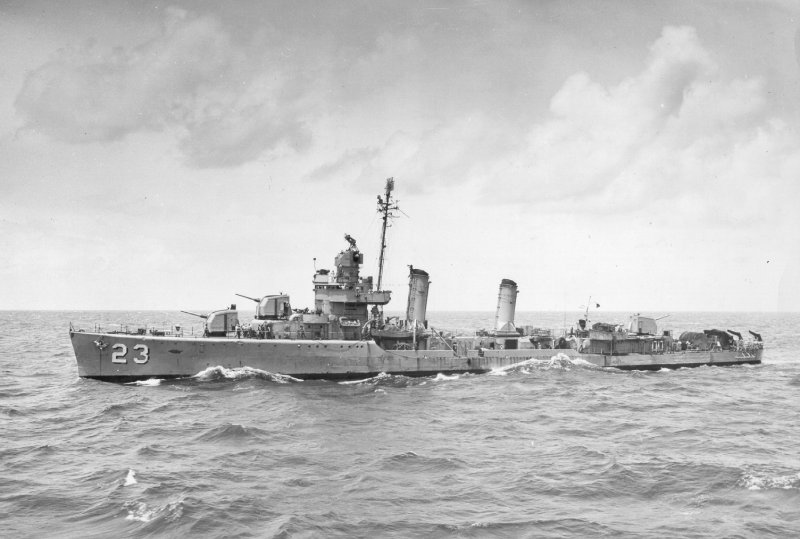
USS Macomb after conversion to a high speed minesweeper.

Departing Sasebo, Japan, on 5 December 1945, Macomb steamed for Norfolk, Va., and Atlantic Fleet duty. In June, 1948, Charleston, South Carolina, become her home port, and until September 1949, Macomb went on patrols and took part in exercises along the eastern coasts of the United States and Canada and in the Caribbean. By the 1950s, Macomb had her Torpedo tubes and aft main 5inch gun removed.

On 8 September 1949, Macomb departed Charleston for the first of three brief tours of duty with the 6th Fleet in the Mediterranean. She returned to Charleston on 13 October. Her second trip to the Mediterranean came in 1951, 20 March to 5 October, the third, 22 April to 24 October 1953. During each cruise Macomb participated in the 6th Fleet exercises and operations, lending support to American diplomatic efforts at settling the unstable political situations then existent in many of the Mediterranean countries.

=== Foreign service 1954 – 1978 ===
In July 1954, Macomb was placed in reserve. On 19 October she was decommissioned and transferred to the Japanese Government, becoming Hatakaze (DD-182) in the Japanese Maritime Self-Defense Force. Her removed aft 5-inch gun was returned to the aft in the 1960s, though Macomb's second 5-inch gun was removed. The former Macomb was returned to U.S. custody in 1969. She was then sold to the Republic of China on 6 August 1970, to replace the former Gleaves-class destroyer Rodman (which had been damaged after running aground) as ROCS Hsien Yang (DD-16). The former Macomb was decommissioned in 1972, struck in 1974, and was serving as a dockside training ship through 1978.

== Battle stars ==
Macomb received five battle stars for World War II service.
