= Macomb Academy of Arts and Sciences =

Coordinates: 42.8462°N 82.88245°W

Information
- Other name: MA^{2}S
- Website: www.armadaschools.org/macomb-academy-of-arts-sciences/

Often referred to as MA^{2}S, the Macomb Academy of Arts and Sciences in Armada, Macomb County, Michigan, is a school for gifted students. Although it is in the Armada Area School District, it is not limited to students enrolled in the district's schools. The current student body also includes students from the Capac, East China, Imlay City, Memphis, Richmond, Romeo and New Haven districts. All courses are taught at the Honors level; some are offered at the AP level.

In 2005, a science teacher at the school was one of three finalists for the Shell Science Teaching Award of the National Science Teachers Association.

The school is home to FIRST Robotics Competition Team 1718, The Fighting Pi. Founded in 2006, it qualified for the FIRST Championship in 2006, 2010, 2011, 2012, 2013, 2014, 2015, 2016 and 2017. It has won eight consecutive district Chairman's Awards, two State of Michigan Engineering Inspiration Awards, and three State Entrepreneurship Awards; and in 2016, it won its first ever Michigan FRC State Championship title (FIRST Stronghold). In 2017, it also won a State Gracious Professionalism Award and a State Chairman's Award. In January 2012 it won in the community outreach category for the Detroit Free Press Automotive Leadership Awards.
